= The Skeptics' Guide to the Universe (book) =

2018 book by Steven Novella

- Author: Steven Novella, Bob Novella, Cara Santa Maria, Jay Novella, Evan Bernstein
- Language: English
- Subject: Scientific skepticism
- Published: October 2, 2018
- Publisher: Grand Central Publishing
- Pages: 512
- ISBN: 978-1538760536

The Skeptics' Guide to the Universe: How to Know What's Really Real in a World Increasingly Full of Fake is a 2018 book meant to be an all-encompassing guide to skeptical thinking written by Steven Novella and co-authored by other hosts of The Skeptics' Guide to the Universe podcast – Bob Novella, Cara Santa Maria, Jay Novella, and Evan Bernstein. It also contains material from former co-host Perry DeAngelis.

== About ==
In 2017, Skeptical Inquirer reported that The Skeptics' Guide to the Universe was under development with an expected release in 2018. It became available for pre-order in early 2018, and was released by Grand Central Publishing on October 2, 2018. The book was written by Steven Novella and co-authored by Bob Novella, Cara Santa Maria, Jay Novella, Perry DeAngelis, and Evan Bernstein – other individuals that have served as hosts of The Skeptics' Guide to the Universe podcast.

In an interview with The European Skeptics Podcast, Jay Novella described their approach to writing the book from the "point of view of an alien species observing the Earth from a skeptical perspective using critical thinking," reminiscent of the book's namesake The Hitchhiker's Guide to the Galaxy by Douglas Adams.

== Reception ==
The book received a favorable review from Kirkus Reviews and was a USA Today bestseller.

Publishers Weekly reviewed the book, stating:

In plain English and cogent prose, Novella makes skepticism seem mighty, necessary, and accessible all at once... Empowering and illuminating, this thinker’s paradise is an antidote to spreading anti-scientific sentiments. Readers will return to its ideas again and again.

The book was also reviewed by Rob Palmer for Skeptical Inquirer, who wrote:

Full disclosure: After my recent interview with Jay Novella for CSI online, I took the assignment to review this book with some trepidation. I am a long-time fan of the podcast, know all the rogues, and had extremely high expectations. I want this book to be successful, so if I was disappointed by it, and felt the need to be harsh, it would have been difficult to be honest in my evaluation. In that case, I think I would have passed the review task to someone else. Happily, that did not have to happen, as I was not disappointed at all.

== Author gallery ==
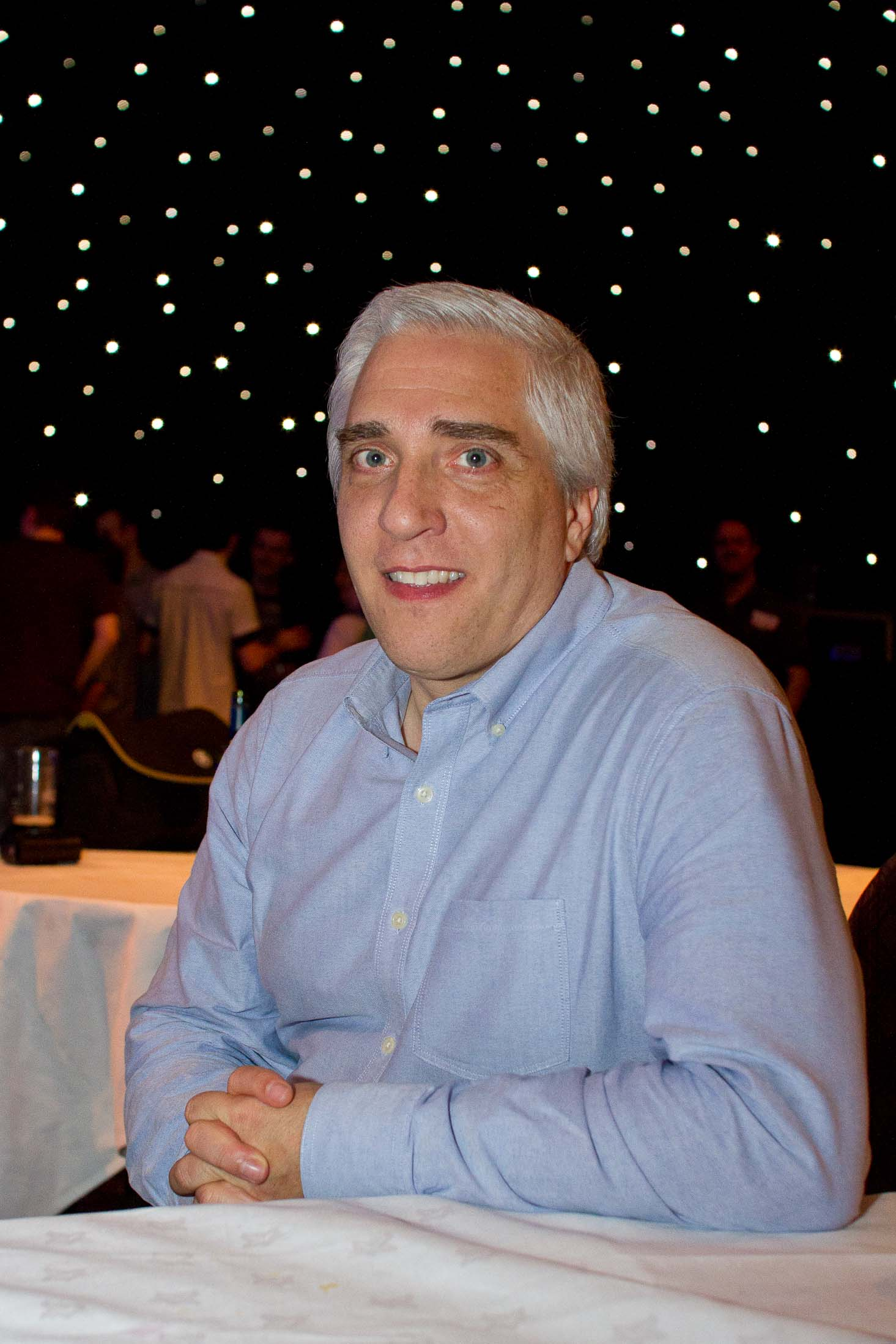
Steve Novella, 2011

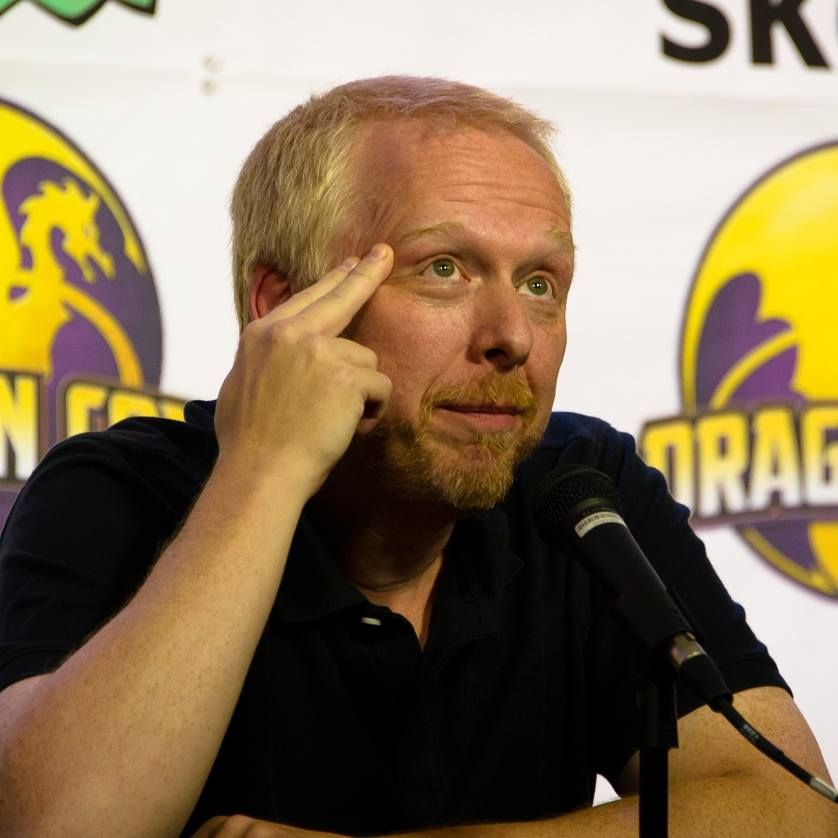
Evan Bernstein, 2015

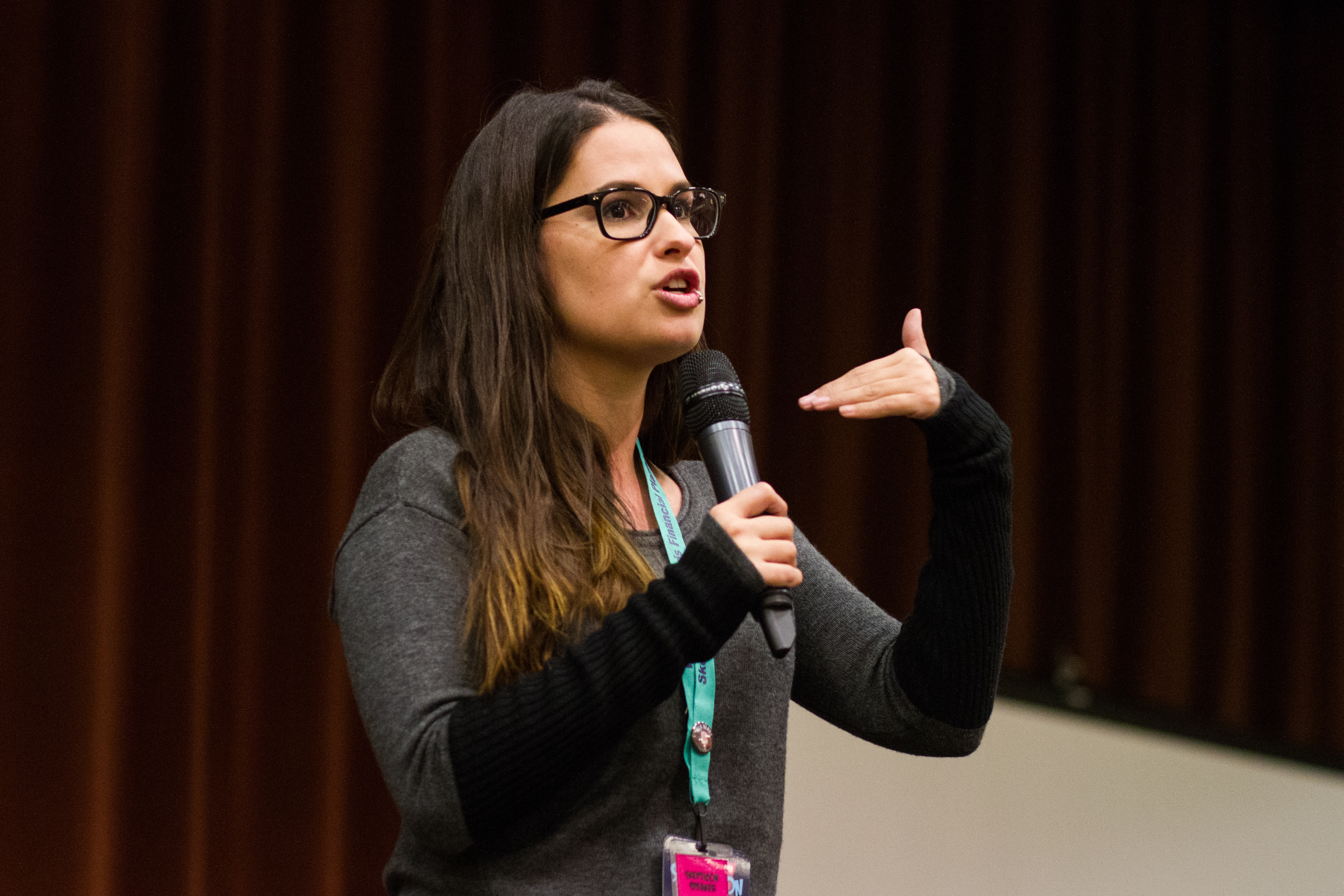
Cara Santa Maria, 2014

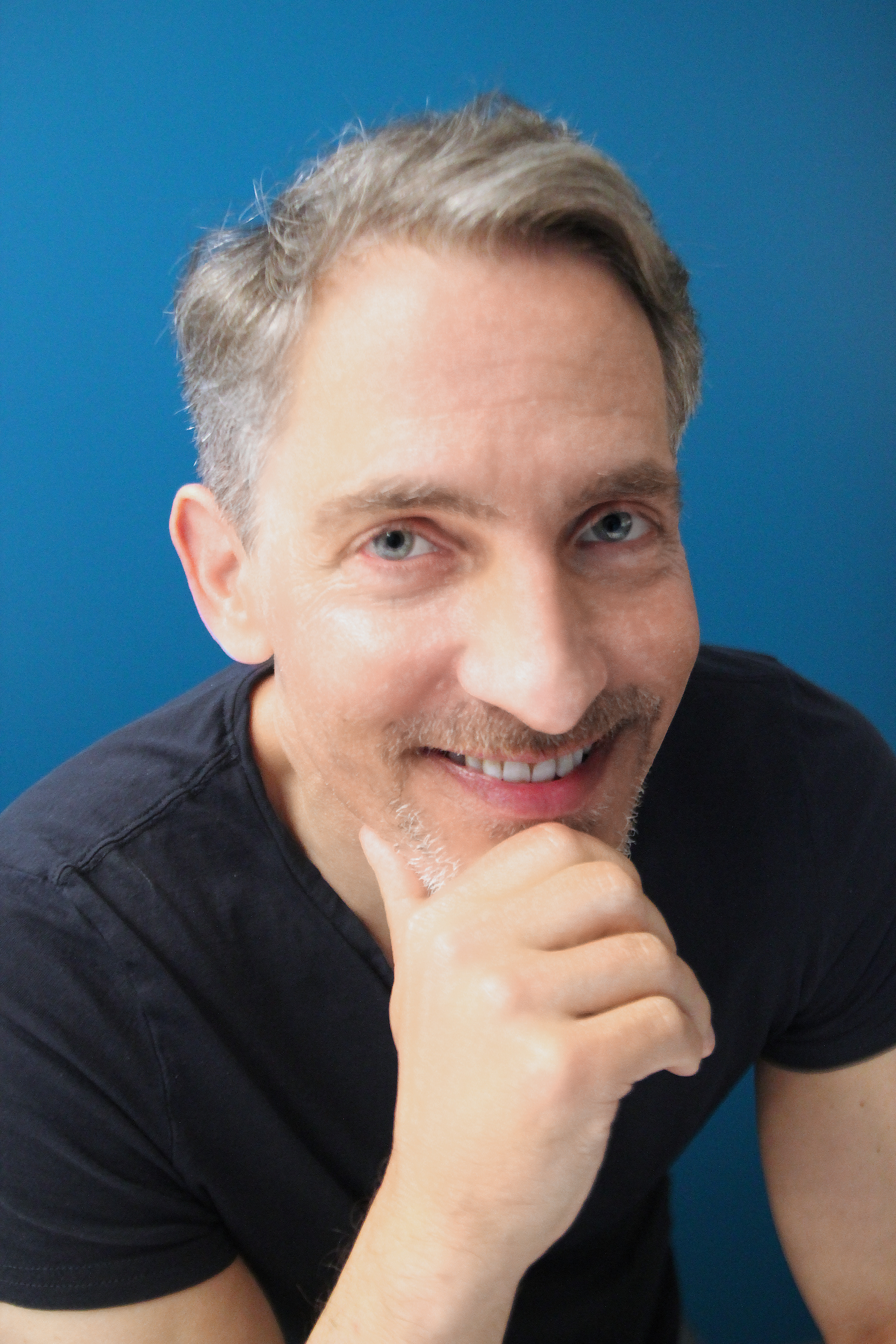
Bob Novella, 2017

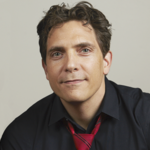
Jay Novella, 2015

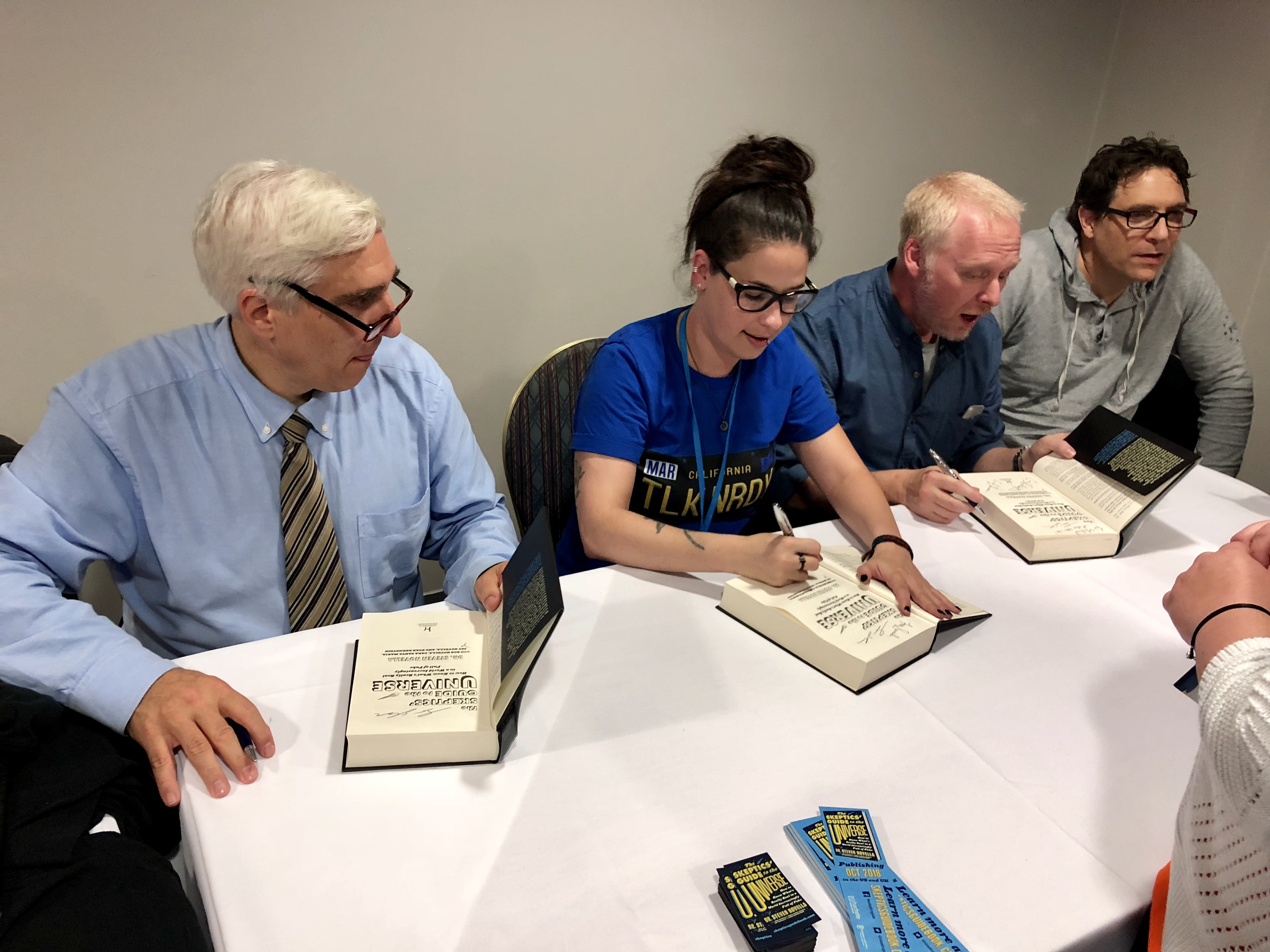
Book signing during QED Conference in Manchester, UK.
