= Joel Barlow High School =

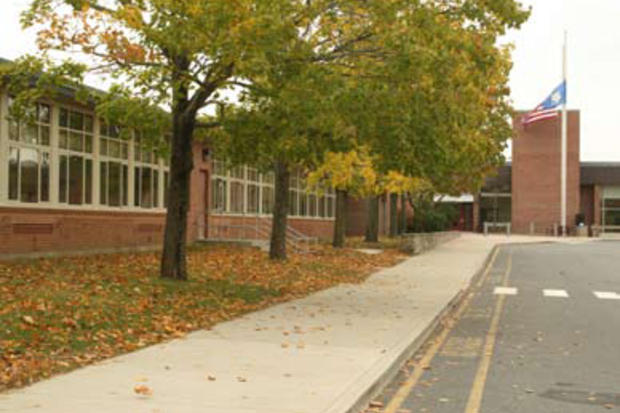

Location
- 100 Black Rock Turnpike; Redding, Connecticut 06896; United States; 41°17′56″N 73°20′39″W

Information
- Type: Public high school
- School district: Region 9 Public Schools
- NCES District ID: 0903780
- CEEB code: 070638
- NCES School ID: 090378000773
- Principal: Mario Almeida
- Teaching staff: 63.08 (on an FTE basis)
- Grades: 9–12
- Enrollment: 698 (2024–25)
- Student to teacher ratio: 11.07
- Colors: Black and gold
- Mascot: Falcons
- Website: jbhs.er9.org

Joel Barlow High School is a public high school serving students in ninth through twelfth grades in Redding, Fairfield County, Connecticut, United States. The school serves Easton and Redding students.

The school is the sole institution in the Region 9 School District of Connecticut, made up of the towns of Redding and Easton, which each have their own public school systems for education up to the eighth grade. The Board of Education acts as its own Board of Finance, and although it reports to the boards of finance in both towns, they have no control over the school budget. Each year a referendum is held on the school budget and must be passed by a majority of voters in the two towns.

As of the 2024-25 school year, the school had an enrollment of 698 students and 63.08 classroom teachers (on an FTE basis), for a student–teacher ratio of 11.07. There were 60 students (8.6% of enrollment) eligible for free lunch and 16 (2.3% of students) eligible for reduced-cost lunch.

For the purpose of comparison with the achievement levels of similar schools, the state Department of Education classifies schools and communities in "District Reference Groups", defined as "districts whose students' families are similar in education, income, occupation and need, and that have roughly similar enrollment". Its total minority enrollment is 13%, 6% of which are Hispanic. Joel Barlow High School (Region 9) is one of eight school districts in District Reference Group A (others are Darien, Easton, New Canaan, Redding, Ridgefield, Westport, and Wilton). It is ranked #15 within the state of Connecticut and #696 in National Rankings of Public High Schools.

== Notable alumni ==
- William R. Wallace (born 1949 attended JBHS, graduated Milford Academy 1969) Retired 747 Captain United Airlines
- C.B Cebulski (born 1971), an American writer and editor for Marvel Comics, known for his work on titles such as Marvel Fairy Tales. As of July 2024, he holds the position of editor-in-chief.
- Pearl Aday (born 1975, class of 1993), singer who has toured as a backing singer in her step-father Meat Loaf's touring band, Neverland Express
- Adam D'Angelo (born 1984), co-founder of Quora; did not graduate from JBHS - graduated from Exeter
- Perry DeAngelis (1963–2007), co-founder and executive director of NESS, co-founder of The Skeptics' Guide to the Universe
- Brooklee Han (born 1995), figure skater who represented Australia at the 2014 Winter Olympics in Sochi
- Charlie Morton (born 1983), 2017 and 2021 World Series champion and MLB pitcher for the Atlanta Braves, Pittsburgh Pirates, Philadelphia Phillies, Houston Astros, and Tampa Bay Rays
- Arthur D. Nicholson (1947–1985), United States Army officer shot and killed by a Soviet sentry in 1985, while conducting intelligence activities in East Germany
- Inigo Philbrick (born 1987/1988), art dealer and convicted fraudster
- Fred Sargeant (born 1948, class of 1966), co-founder of first Pride march in 1970, retired police lieutenant of City of Stamford, CT Police Department
