= Science-Based Medicine =

Website covering issues in science and medicine, focusing on quackery

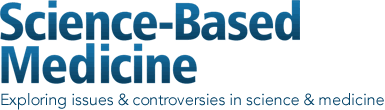

- Website type: Blog
- Available in: English
- Owner: New England Skeptical Society
- Key people: Steven Novella, David Gorski
- Website: www.sciencebasedmedicine.org
- Commercial: No
- Launched: January 1, 2008

Science-Based Medicine is a website and blog with articles covering issues in science and medicine, especially medical scams and practices. Founded in 2008, it is owned and operated by the New England Skeptical Society, and run by Steven Novella and David Gorski.

== History ==
Started as a skeptical medical blog with five writers, Science-Based Medicine (SBM) launched on January 1, 2008. Steven Novella, Harriet Hall, and David Gorski were founding editors, along with Mark Crislip and Kimball Atwood.

Science-Based Medicine is owned and operated by the New England Skeptical Society (NESS), where Novella, a clinical neurologist at Yale University and the executive editor of SBM, has served as president since its inception. Gorski, a surgical oncologist at Wayne State University, is the managing editor for SBM.

The blog was affiliated with the former Society for Science-Based Medicine (SfSBM), an opinionated education and advocacy group, that registered in 2014 as a Florida nonprofit corporation led by Mark Crislip. The SfSBM was dissolved in 2020, with the Center for Inquiry receiving its funds as a donation and considered by the SfSBM's board to continue its work, following a period of time where SfSBM had merged with SBM.

Other key contributors have included writer Paul Ingraham (2010–2016) and Wallace Sampson, an editor and regular contributor to SBM until his death in 2017.

== Content and format ==
Science-Based Medicine is a website in blog format that examines controversies in science and medicine, especially medical scams and practices. SBM is known for persistently challenging alternative medicine and for opposing university funding from advocates of integrative medicine. David Freedman, writing for The Atlantic in 2011, described SBM as "an influential blog that has tirelessly gone after alternative medicine."

Editorial staff say that the best medicine is based on scientific principles, includes prior plausibility, and is not based on evidence alone. Gorski, Novella, and Atwood have argued that science-based medicine differs in focus from evidence-based medicine and stress that randomized clinical trials should only be conducted when warranted by ample preclinical evidence to justify the effort, time, and expenses involved. For a science-based approach, Novella supports minimizing or eliminating research on implausible treatments, and points out that decades are often required for clinical research to become supported by rigorous, conclusive trials, during which time decisions must be made, preferably guided by and screened by plausibility criteria.

In a systematic survey of web sites providing material on complementary and alternative medicine from 2018, medical education researcher Annie Chen and colleagues listed Science-Based Medicine alongside WebMD as an example of an "information service" providing articles on health and illness.

During the COVID-19 pandemic, Science-Based Medicine collected and debunked misinformation that had spread through social media, such as the false claim that COVID-19 vaccines could cause infertility.

== Retractions ==
On June 15, 2021, Science-Based Medicine published a book review of Abigail Shrier's Irreversible Damage written by founding editor Harriet Hall. In her review, Hall wrote that Shrier's book had raised legitimate concerns about the science surrounding drug treatments for gender dysphoria in children and that there was a lack of quality scientific studies on the subject. Several days after the review was published, Novella and Gorski replaced the review with a retraction notice and responded with a review of their own, the first of six SBM posts rejecting Shrier's claims and addressing the retraction.

Skeptic magazine republished Hall's review, and she remained one of three editors at SBM along with Novella and Gorski after the retraction until her death in 2023.

== Legal ==
In 2014, Novella was sued by Edward Tobinick, a doctor claiming to treat neurological conditions, over two blog posts on Science-Based Medicine critical of off-label use of the drug Etanercept by Tobinick's medical clinic. Novella had said that it was "unethical for physicians to practice outside of their area of competence and expertise". The lawsuit, filed by Tobinick against Novella, the Society for Science-Based Medicine, Inc., and SGU Productions, LLC was resolved after the court ruled in favor of the defendants.

== See also ==
- Evidence-based practice
- Quackwatch
