= Skeptical Inquirer =

Bimonthly magazine published by CSI

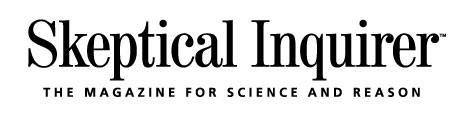
- Editor-in-chief: Stephen Hupp
- Frequency: Bimonthly
- Publisher: Center for Inquiry; Committee for Skeptical Inquiry
- Founded: 1976; 50 years ago
- Country: United States
- Based in: Amherst, New York
- Language: English
- Website: skepticalinquirer.org
- ISSN: 0194-6730

Skeptical Inquirer (S.I.) is a bimonthly American general-audience magazine published by the Committee for Skeptical Inquiry (CSI) with the subtitle "The Magazine for Science and Reason". The magazine initially focused on investigating claims of the paranormal, but evolved and expanded to address other pseudoscientific topics. The magazine "sets out to debunk all manner of claims relating to paranormal activity and pseudoscience". Notable skeptics have credited the magazine in influencing their development of scientific skepticism. In the "Letters to the Editor", the most frequent letters of appreciation come from educators.

== History ==
The magazine was originally titled The Zetetic (from the Greek meaning "skeptical seeker" or "inquiring skeptic"), and was originally edited by Marcello Truzzi. About a year after its inception a schism developed between the editor Truzzi and the rest of the Committee for the Scientific Investigation of Claims of the Paranormal (CSICOP). CSICOP was more "firmly opposed to nonsense, more willing to go on the offensive and to attack supernatural claims" while Truzzi wanted science and pseudoscience to exist "happily together". Founder Paul Kurtz strongly believed "it's important that, when claims of the paranormal get wide public attention and belief, the skeptical position also get media attention". Truzzi resigned to start The Zetetic Scholar and CSICOP changed the magazine's name to Skeptical Inquirer and hired Kendrick Frazier as the new editor.

The first issue of S.I. was Fall/Winter 1976. In 1995, S.I. changed format from digest size to a standard magazine size, increased the publication frequency from quarterly to bimonthly, and added newsstand circulation in addition to subscription.

In 2013, writer and skeptic Daniel Loxton posited that if Skeptical Inquirer was not the first skeptical publication, it is yet considered the "'birth of modern skepticism' (at least for the English-speaking world)" because CSICOP organized "this scholarship collectively [and] comprised a distinct field of study", and was the first to establish "best practices... specialist experts... buildings... periodicals and professional writers and researchers".

Barry Karr is the executive director of CSI and Skeptical Inquirer. In June 2023, Stephen Hupp, a professor in the Department of Psychology at Southern Illinois University Edwardsville, was named as the magazine's editor. Hupp replaced Stuart Vyse, who was the interim editor in November 2022 following the passing of Kendrick Frazier.

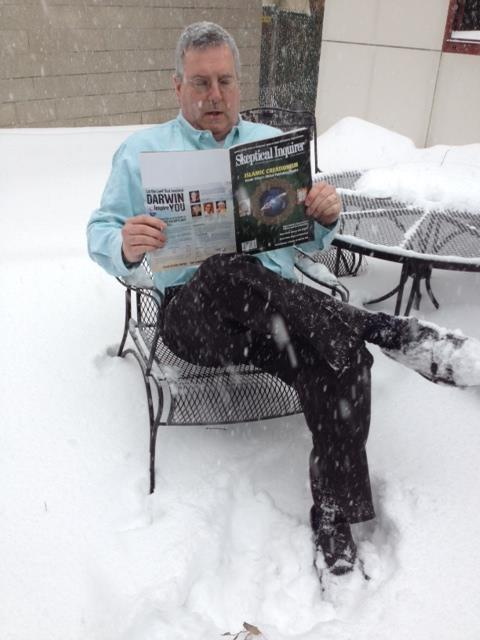
Barry Karr, Executive Director

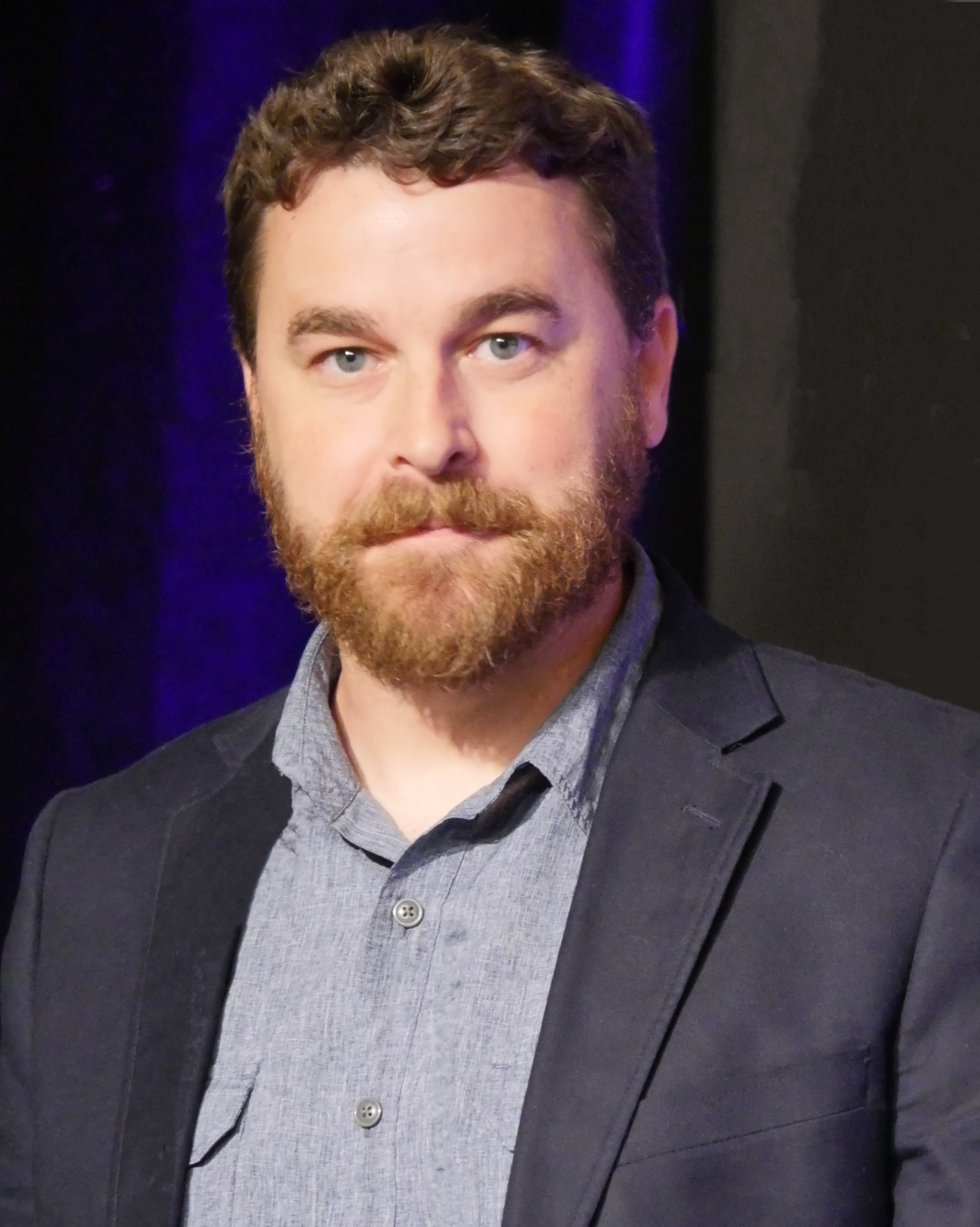
Stephen Hupp, Editor

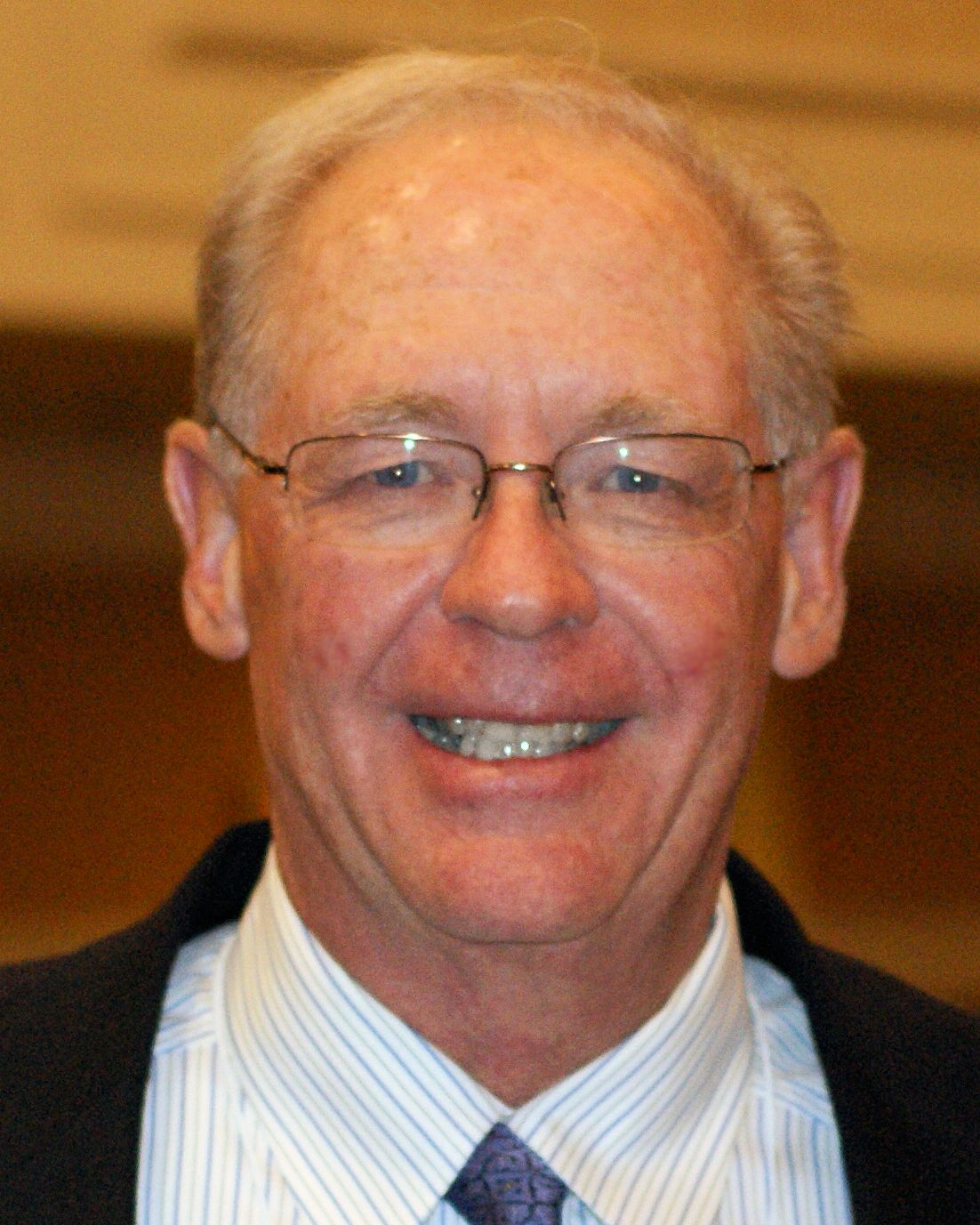
Kendrick Frazier, Editor 1977–2022

== Focus ==
The Committee for Skeptical Inquiry is a scientific society and publishes articles from independent scientists and investigators in the Skeptical Inquirer. Published topics have included fringe science, pseudoscience, paranormalism, psychic phenomena, astrology, ufology, homeopathy, and New Age, as well as articles on politics, general science, cyberterrorism, and others. Writing for Scientific American in 1982, cognitive scientist Douglas Hofstadter said that the purpose of Skeptical Inquirer was to "combat nonsense" with articles in English that require no special knowledge or expertise, only "curiosity about truth".

The January/February 2023 issue featured an article by Craig Foster that examined Skeptical Inquirer Vol. 1, no. 1 comparing it to the current publication, and found that "1976 principles of skepticism" still resonate forty-six years later "The Truzzi and Kurtz editorials are so consistent with contemporary skepticism, I think Skeptical Inquirer could reprint them today, without dates, and readers wouldn't find them peculiar." Furthermore "The only out-of-place sentiment seems to be imagining the journal as an exchange between skeptics and paranormal promotors".

== Reception and influence ==
Science communicator Neil deGrasse Tyson said Skeptical Inquirer is his favorite magazine and it tells him what people are currently "misthinking" about. In his 2017 book, Bill Nye recommended S.I. to his readers as a magazine that "promote[s] the aggressive form of critical thinking needed to immunize us to fakery". Eric Zorn wrote that S.I. "remains a favorite of those of us who can, in fact, handle the truth".

Several notable skeptics have described the magazine as influential to the early stages of their development as scientific skeptics. In 1996, Perry DeAngelis and Steven Novella, observing that the magazine had no listing for a Connecticut skeptic group, founded the New England Skeptical Society and eventually the Skeptic's Guide to the Universe (SGU) podcast.

Writing for Scientific American, Douglas Hofstadter asked the question, why would Skeptical Inquirer succeed when the only people who read it are people who do not believe in the paranormal? The answer, he says, lies in the back of the magazine in the "Letters to the Editor" section. "Many people write in to say how vital the magazine has been to them, their friends and their students. High school teachers are among the most frequent writers of thank-you notes to the magazine's editors, but I have also seen enthusiastic letters from members of the clergy, radio talk-show hosts and people in many other professions."

Daniel Loxton, in his essay "Ode to Joy" about discovering Skeptical Inquirer magazine as a freshman at his University writes...

But the true treasure, the lamp at the end of the cave, the thing that helped set the course of my life, was hidden away in the periodical collection: a complete set of the Skeptical Inquirer, going back to its launch in 1976. I couldn't believe such a wealth of skeptical research existed! I worked my way through the stack systematically, hungrily....

The magazine has been criticized for not sufficiently debunking racist pseudoscience, after publishing a special issue "A Skeptic's Guide to Racism", author Kavin Senapathy noted the entire issue was authored by white men demonstrating a "woefully shallow grasp of how racism works".

=== Levy and Olynyk art project ===
Inspired by the four decades of Skeptical Inquirer magazine, an exhibition titled Some Provocations from Skeptical Inquirers by artists Ellen Levy and Patricia Olynyk, was held at the Baruch College Mishkin Gallery in February 2016. Reviewer Eileen G'Sell wrote that the artists "plumb the depths of the murky ontological sea that is empirical belief." Writing for The Brooklyn Rail, reviewer William Corwin stated that the artwork represented "this built-in confrontation between fact and fiction (which) was the basis of the Skeptical Inquirer itself and its playful willingness to consider the most unlikely phenomena."

== See also ==
- CSICon
- Skeptic (U.S. magazine)
- The Skeptic (UK magazine)
- The Skeptic's Dictionary
- Skeptical movement
- Snopes.com
