= Perry DeAngelis =

American podcaster (1963–2007)

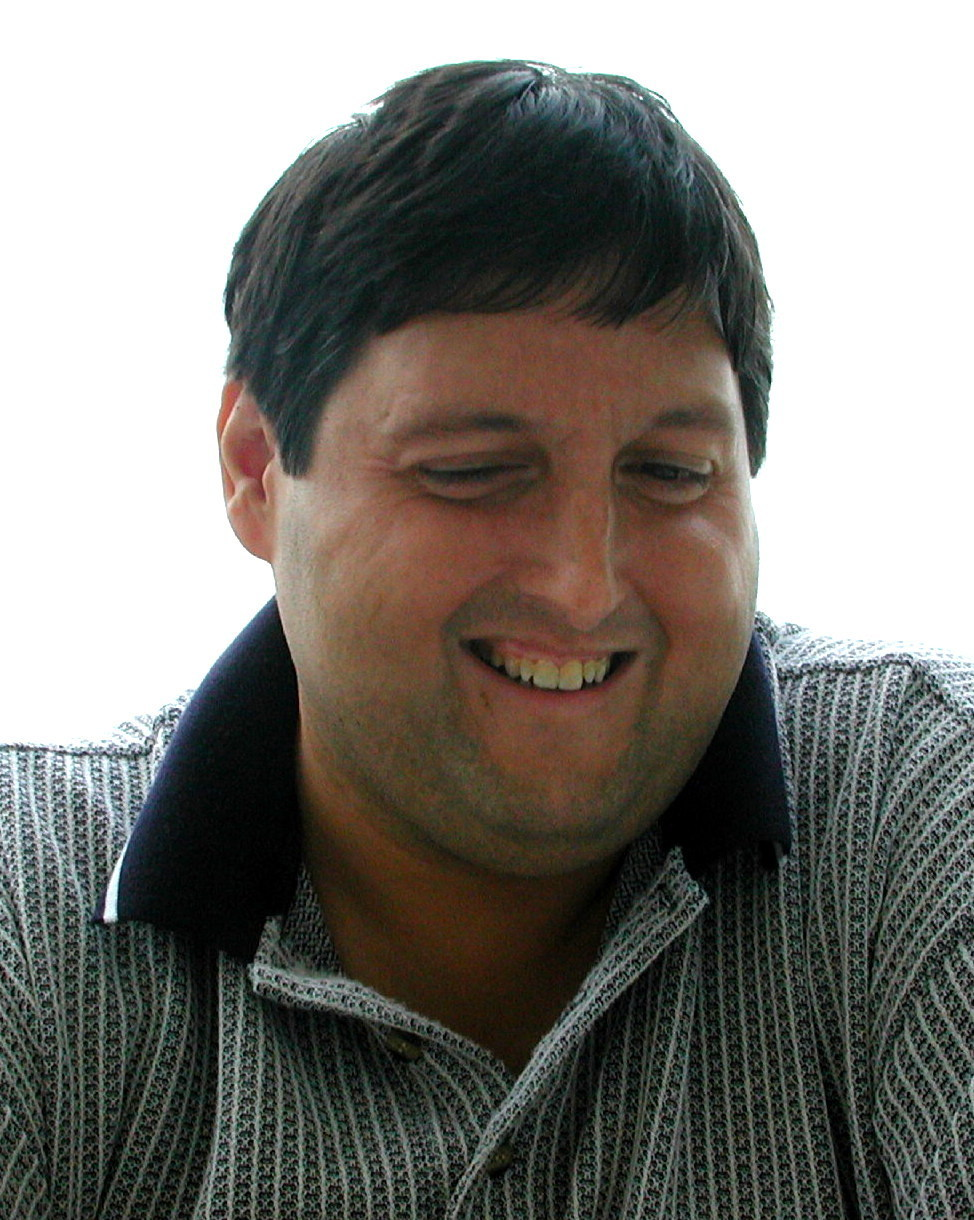
- DeAngelis in August 2000
- Born: Perry J. DeAngelis; August 22, 1963; Bridgeport, Connecticut, US
- Died: August 19, 2007 (aged 43); New Haven, Connecticut, US
- Known for: Founder of The New England Skeptical Society and rogue on The Skeptics' Guide to the Universe podcast
- Spouse: Terry Wegener
- Website: ness.org, www.rememberingperry.org/wp/, www.theskepticsguide.org

Perry J. DeAngelis (August 22, 1963 – August 19, 2007) was an American podcaster. He is best known for co-hosting the Skeptics' Guide to the Universe podcast, which he helped found. DeAngelis is known for his and Steve Novella's investigation into Ed and Lorraine Warren's ghost hunting claims. He was also co-founder and executive director of the New England Skeptical Society, and was very active in the skeptical movement and paranormal investigations until his death from scleroderma in 2007.

== Early life ==
DeAngelis was born in 1963 to parents Lawrence and Marie Cook DeAngelis in Bridgeport, Connecticut. He had an older sister, Marie and brother Derald, and a younger sister Celeste. According to his close friend Steven Novella, DeAngelis worked for his father as a property manager until his death in 2007.

Novella remembers DeAngelis as someone who was "interested in having extreme experiences . . [having] a joie de vivre . . . just wanted to grab life by the horns." For several years in his late teens he competed in the local demolition derby, creating a persona called Dr. Demo. "He would sign surgical masks and hand them out after his races". Friend Evan Bernstein remembers that DeAngelis would wear scrubs and rubber gloves to the races, and stand on the top of the car to get the audience riled up.

DeAngelis graduated from Joel Barlow High School and attended New York University.

== New England Skeptical Society (NESS) ==
In 1996 DeAngelis and brothers Bob and Steven Novella founded The Connecticut Skeptical Society. "The three... formed the society in January 1996 after their love of science drew them into the network of national and regional skeptical societies and they discovered there were none in Connecticut."

As Evan Bernstein tells it, "One night sometime in late 1995, Perry was over [at] Steve's condo, casually flipping through a copy of SI (Skeptical Inquirer). He was reading through the list of local groups, and commented to Steve: 'There's no local skeptics group in Connecticut. We should start one.'" Steve states that he [Steve] took on the majority of the "heavy lifting" but Perry was "right there" the whole time. "He was in love with the big ideas, the logistics and the details that was for other people to worry about, which is why Perry and I worked really well together. Because I quickly became the detail and logistic person that made things happen," but he gets the credit for having the original big idea. According to Bernstein, "He was a man of large thoughts."

According to the Connecticut Post DeAngelis "if punched in the nose by a ghost, would immediately look for the zipper on the assailant's costume." DeAngelis states that they wanted to form the Connecticut Skeptical Society because "too few people were 'looking for the zippers'... 'We just felt that it was important that there be somebody right here standing for the vanguard of reason and critical thought'." DeAngelis sees critical thinking skills as being very important for society, Heaven's Gate might not have happened if the UFO culture weren't so popular. '"There's so much around us that is so fantastic. If you do see a bright light in the nighttime sky, maybe that's a satellite, the space shuttle on the way home, or some other wonderful thing of a terrestrial nature."'

The group later joined with the Skeptical Inquirers of New England (SINE) and the New Hampshire Skeptical Resource to form the New England Skeptical Society (NESS).

The NESS was actively involved in investigating claims of the paranormal. "If there are ghosts, great! If there are spirits, terrific! I'd love to talk to the spirits of the past." DeAngelis is quoted as saying, but he never received a good answer to "What is your evidence?" Satanism, homeopathy, Dowsing, Cults and UFOs have all been given attention by NESS. In October 1996, Steven Novella appeared on an episode of the Ricki Lake show that talked about vampires. One of the other guests claimed to be a psychic vampire who could drain people's minds. DeAngelis stood up in the audience spread his arms and said "Drain Me". The psychic claimed that it does not work in public. DeAngelis later stated "I had my doubts she could drain a sink".

One of DeAngelis' favorite investigations was when he and Steven Novella looked into the stories of Ed and Lorraine Warren, on which the movies The Amityville Horror and The Conjuring are based. "Perry thought they were cranks", said Novella, "He always loved extreme personalities, and they were very extreme." In an article for the Sydney Morning Herald that examined whether supernatural films are really based on true events, that investigation was used as evidence to the contrary. As Novella is quoted, "They (The Warrens) claim to have scientific evidence which does indeed prove the existence of ghosts, which sounds like a testable claim into which we can sink our investigative teeth. What we found was a very nice couple, some genuinely sincere people, but absolutely no compelling evidence..." While neither DeAngelis nor Novella thought the Warrens would intentionally cause harm to anyone, they did caution that claims like the Warrens' served to reinforce delusions and confuse the public about legitimate scientific methodology.

According to an interview with DeAngelis and Novella for the Connecticut Post, the NESS report on the Warrens found the couple to be very nice people, but their claims of demon and ghosts to be "at best, as tellers of meaningless ghost stories, and at worst, dangerous frauds." They took the $12.50 tour and looked at all the evidence the Warrens had for spirits and ghosts. The watched the videos and looked at the best evidence the Warrens had. "Their conclusion: It's all blarney." They found common errors with flash photograph and nothing evil in the artifacts the Warren's have collected. '"They have... a ton of fish stories about evidence that got away... They're not doing good scientific investigation; they have a predetermined conclusions which they adhere to, literally religiously"' according to Novella. The Warrens were hurt that the skeptics did not take their work seriously, Lorraine Warren said that the problem with Perry and Steve "is they don't base anything on a God".

== Skeptics' Guide to the Universe podcast ==
A 3 min 42 sec extract of the August 24, 2007, podcast featuring Perry DeAngelis.

DeAngelis was instrumental in getting the podcast started and is credited with coming up with the name. As fellow SGU panelist Bob Novella tells it, "In 2005 emails flew back and forth for days as we tried to think of a name for our show. He sent an email with a final salvo of ideas and embedded in there was “The Skeptics' Guide to the Universe.” The Douglas Adams reference resonated with us instantly and we made it so." Jay Novella agrees with his brother, Bob, “Perry sent this awesome list of a bunch of different names and “The Skeptics' Guide to the Universe” was on there, and it just seemed like the perfect name.”

DeAngelis took his involvement with the podcast so seriously that during the two weeks before his passing, he recorded his Skeptical Quote segment via phone from his hospital room. Steven Novella said "it gave his life a tremendous amount of meaning. He participated in most of the first 108 episodes. He took his involvement seriously and during the two weeks before his passing, he recorded his Skeptical Quote segment via phone from his hospital room."

During the second annual live SGU show at NECSS in 2009, Steven Novella said, "We still get emails... it's been two years... from listeners who are listening to the shows in order from the beginning. They get Perry, they totally connect to him, they can see his personality coming through the podcast and they experience the loss over again... We are very happy to have the podcast that preserves who Perry was."

At the 2010 NECSS live SGU show, Steve Novella said "We still get emails, on a regular basis, from people who are listening back through our archives, and are losing Perry for the first time. It amazes us how much he can emotionally affect people... for them the loss is still fresh... it touches us but we lose Perry all over again."

== Northeast Conference on Science and Skepticism (NECSS) ==
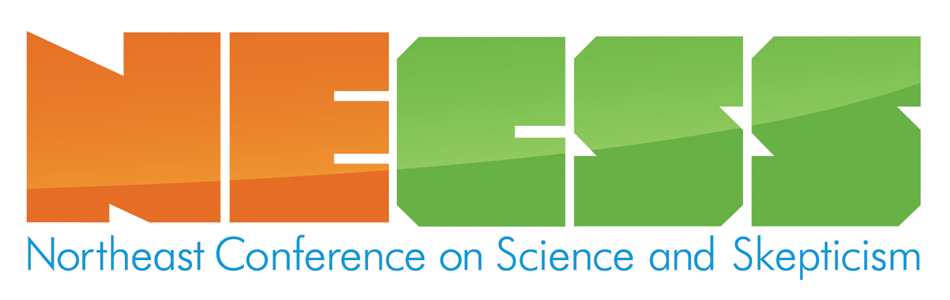

Northeast Conference on Science and Skepticism (NECSS), pronounced "nexus", is a three-day conference focusing on science and skepticism held each April in the New York City area. Founded in 2009, it is a joint conference between the New York Skeptics and the New England Skeptical Society (NESS).

According to Steven Novella and Evan Bernstein, the NESS was asked to speak for the New York Skeptics September 12, 2009. That lecture was a tribute to DeAngelis, and as it was near the anniversary of both his birth and death in August, they continued the tradition of celebrating DeAngelis at each conference. Even after the organizers decided to move the conference to April, they continue to celebrate the life of DeAngelis each year at NECSS.

== Personal life ==
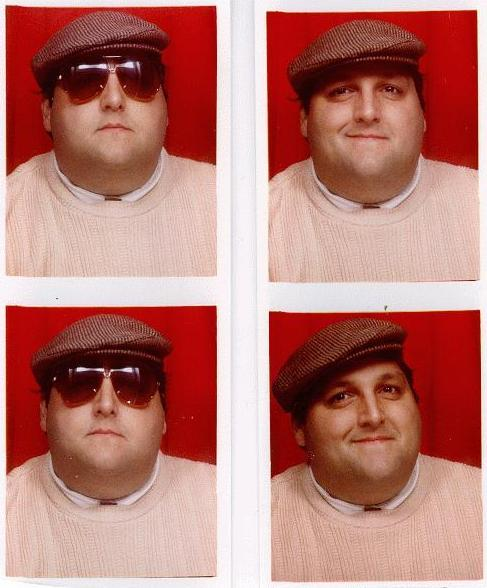

Although his family was Catholic, DeAngelis was always an atheist. According to Novella, "He said he never believed, not even the slightest bit".

DeAngelis was a big history buff and was particularly interested in The Civil War and World War II. He collected books, hats, banners and all kinds of memorabilia.

He was a sports fan, particularly baseball, and was a "long suffering Yankees fan", as friend Evan Bernstein puts it. "Anytime the Yankees were playing, he would have to be near a radio or television"

He enjoyed tabletop games such as Dungeons & Dragons. At one time he was a co-owner of a game shop and hosted many live-action role playing events. Bernstein credits these gaming events for possibly being the reason why he, DeAngelis and Novella were comfortable speaking in front of audiences and being natural on the SGU podcast, as they had already "got their butterflies out" by performing impromptu gaming scenarios in public. DeAngelis was "dramatic" and "didn't sweat the small details," as Steven Novella puts it. For live action role-playing, when DeAngelis was giving the players their roles and was asked how many hit points a character had, "his answer was almost always 'per dramatic effect', whatever you need to do to make it fun and dramatic. That became a 'Perryism'."

Novella remembers that one big idea DeAngelis had was to put up a really large canvas over 5th Avenue in New York, and letting cars pass under it and paint with brushes or throw paint at it, "this was the biggest most ridiculous art project he could think of".

DeAngelis and Bernstein shared an interest in many radio programs; morning programs such as Howard Stern; political shows, sports shows and fun ones such as Car Talk.

His wife, Terry Wegener DeAngelis, was a Jehovah's Witness. Evan Bernstein said of their relationship, "She never held her beliefs against him and he never held his beliefs against her . . . Obviously their love for each other trumped all of that . . . They took care of each other." Steven Novella said, "you wouldn't expect him to be extremely tolerant but in fact Perry was a very very tolerant person in terms of other people's personal choices. He didn't care what people did or what people believed; he didn't have any real judgmentalism about people's personal choices. If you were an idiot he was very judgmental about that; he did not suffer fools well, but in terms of how you lived your life, he could not care at all. One thing that I think reflects that that I don't think many of our listeners know is that Perry's wife is a Jehovah's Witness. Wrap your mind around that."

== Health and death ==
In a report for NESS in 2000, DeAngelis writes about an encounter with aliens he had after surgery to remove his gallbladder. It had become pancreatitis and he was scheduled for a cholecystectomy which he was assured is a routine and simple operation. In his case it was not, because of his weight and the thickness of his skin due to his scleroderma. After surgery he was in the ICU for several days. For most of the first few days he was delirious. He recalls a brief visit from his mother and his sister, but then his kidneys started to shut down and his breathing became labored which caused carbon dioxide to build up in his blood. This is "when the aliens came for me". He remembers looking at the nurse and realizing that she was an alien and that he had been taken to a secret part of the hospital. He managed to scream at the alien doctors that came to drug him further, and pulled out his feeding tubes, while shouting '"I don't want that!"'. When he woke he was tied down, which further confirmed the plot against him. His family and friends began to visit more as he was later to learn that he was extremely ill and stopped breathing at one point. Days later he finally stabilized and woke to "find Jocelyn Novella... [there holding] her one-year-old daughter, Julia. I remember looking at Julia, and knowing for the first time that she could not possibly be an alien. Not little “Hoopie-doo!” (a nickname of hers). I knew then I was safe." DeAngelis writes that he learned what he experienced was a "delirium known as ICU psychosis." In his case his culture had led him to believe that aliens were operating on him because he had been reading stories about UFOs and aliens since puberty. At the time he was experiencing this it was very real and terrifying. "I was scared, disoriented, paranoid, and felt very alone." DeAngelis wrote this article to bring attention to this type of delirium and to explain that he now has a new appreciation of the terror of paranoia.

The first episode after DeAngelis's death, the crew of the SGU shared memories of their friend and colleague. Steven Novella felt that if people had the facts of DeAngelis's death it would help the grieving process. Novella stated that "Perry always told me that I could basically tell everybody anything that they wanted to know about his medical condition." He also had access to his medical records. DeAngelis did have type 2 diabetes, and he was diagnosed with scleroderma in 1997. In the end he was having problems with his fingers as they would curl, also shortness of breath and trouble with any exertion. He had had many heart attacks over the last few years and was hospitalized many times. Novella and his family had gone in to visit him; he had just finished dinner and his mother was with him. Novella left his wife and kids in the hallway to see if he was okay for visitors. DeAngelis had just finished dinner and was having trouble breathing. "And then Perry his eyes looked up to the left which I recognize as a neurological sign and then the heart monitor went flat and the team converged". After 45 minutes the team gave up trying to resuscitate him.

Rogue Jay Novella remembered conversations he had had with DeAngelis about his health and diagnosis. "He would basically say he's living his life the way he wants to. It was kind of the subtext was 'cause he knew that he didn't have a lot of time and he was doing everything in his power to just make himself happy."

== Legacy ==
In an episode of The SGU recording a few years after DeAngelis' death, Novella said, "So we have two quotes today to close out the show. This one came from a listener. We get these emails all the time. This was just the most recent. The emailer said to us, 'I am a skeptic. I am a free thinker. I discard drivel and exonerate exactitude. I thank Perry DeAngelis.' So, our annual live show in New York is always our Perry DeAngelis memorial show; that's in fact how NECSS started, by us giving a show here to honor Perry. And so it's also good to note as we often do that we continue to get emails from people who just found the podcast, are going back through old episodes, like 'hey, who was this Perry guy? He's awesome; why isn't he podcasting any more?'. Of course they discover that he died a few years ago, unfortunately. But his legacy still lives on and we will always remember him at NECSS."

In another SGU episode recorded at NECSS in 2013, Novella said, "Perry was a huge presence on the show and we think about him every day he's been gone and we miss his presences on the show. We make sure we always pause to remember what he meant to us and what he meant to the SGU." In the July 19, 2016, episode of the Skepticality podcast, Susan Gerbic discussed DeAngelis, his life and death, his contributions to the skeptical movement, and his key role in starting The Skeptics' Guide to the Universe podcast. Gerbic said "[We need] to keep his very important contributions to our movement alive. We should not forget him. We need many more Perry DeAngelis's out there. People with big thoughts, and with a giant heart. He inspires me."

A 2018 book on the subject of scientific skepticism, written by Steve Novella and DeAngelis' Skeptics' Guide co-hosts, The Skeptics' Guide to the Universe: How to Know What's Really Real in a World Increasingly Full of Fake, was dedicated as follows: "Dedicated to Perry DeAngelis, A friend and skeptic of some note." The book also contains a chapter, "Dennis Lee and Free Energy – Perry's Adventure" which uses material which DeAngelis wrote for the NESS in 2001. Novella had previously written of DeAngelis in his Neurologica blog:

Perry's popularity was easy to understand – Perry had presence. The power of his personality went into everything he did, and every relationship he had. He made his opinions known and actually delighted in not sugar-coating them. Truth and reason were very important to him, so much so that he felt the truth had to be brutal. He would not diminish it with mere social nicety. This also means that when he expressed friendship, you knew he meant it. As big as Perry's presence was in our lives, that is the size of the hole he will leave by his absence.

During his 2018 interview of Jay Novella for Skeptical Inquirer, Rob Palmer provided one example of the impact of DeAngelis' death on a podcast fan when he told Novella:

I was one of those people who, after discovering the podcast in more recent times, went back and listened to the entire catalog from the very beginning. I listened to about ten years' worth in about a year. That made me feel like I knew all of you personally, and the unexpected death of Perry DeAngelis in 2007 hit me hard. I even sent a condolence letter to you all—many, many years too late.

== Photo gallery ==
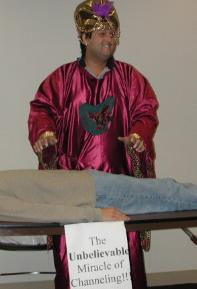
Psychic Surgeon at a NESS event – 1999

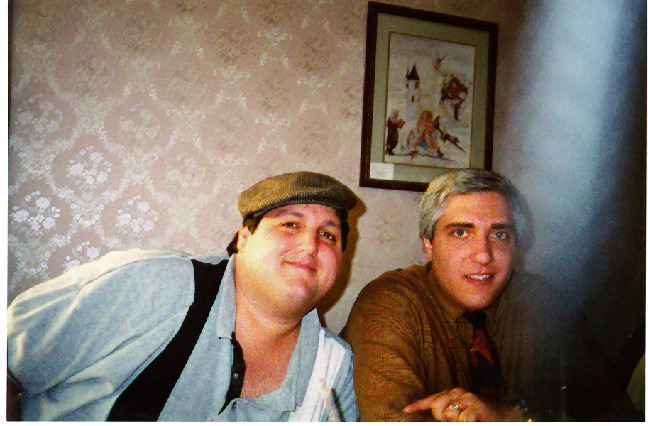
Perry DeAngelis and Steven Novella – 1999

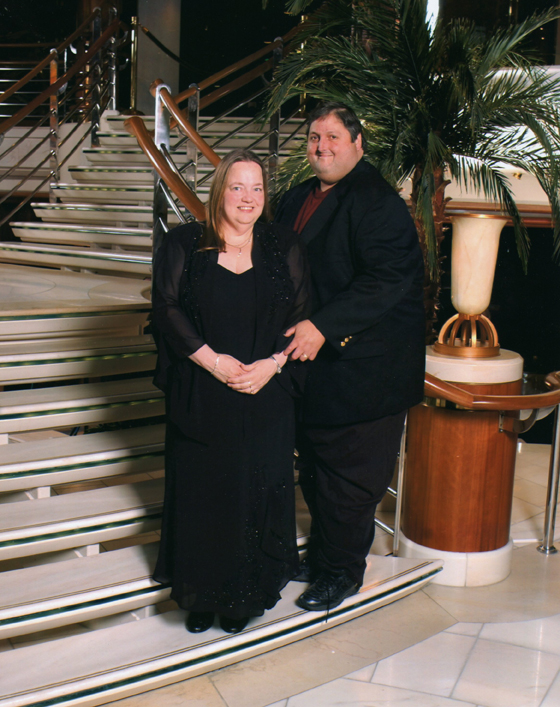
Jenna and Perry DeAngelis on wedding day – Sept. 2001
