= Steven Novella =

American neurologist and scientific skeptic (born 1964)

- Novella at Dragon Con in 2026
- Born: Steven Paul Novella; July 29, 1964 (age 62); Danbury, Connecticut, U.S.
- Education: Georgetown University
- Known for: Editor of Science-Based Medicine; Host of The Skeptics' Guide to the Universe podcast
- Scientific career
- Fields: Clinical neurology
- Workplaces: Yale School of Medicine
- Medical career
- Profession: Neurology
- Sub-specialties: Botulinum therapy, ALS/myasthenia gravis and neuromuscular disorders, general neurology, neurophysiology
- Research: ALS, myasthenia gravis, neuropathy, and erythromelalgia
- Awards: Robert P. Balles Prize for Critical Thinking
- Website: theness.com/neurologicablog

Steven Paul Novella (born July 29, 1964) is an American clinical neurologist and associate professor at Yale University School of Medicine. Novella is best known for his involvement in the skeptical movement as a host of The Skeptics' Guide to the Universe podcast and as the president of the New England Skeptical Society. He is a fellow of the Committee for Skeptical Inquiry (CSI).

== Early life and education ==
Novella was born July 29, 1964 to Joseph Novella and Patricia Novella née Anderson. He was raised in New Fairfield, Connecticut, and has four siblings. Novella considered becoming a lawyer prior to attending college but decided to go into medicine as a teenager. As an undergraduate, he pursued premed and science.

In 1991, Novella earned a medical degree from Georgetown University School of Medicine. He spent the first year of residency at Georgetown University Hospital/Washington Hospital Center in internal medicine. He completed his residency in neurology at Yale–New Haven Hospital in 1995. Novella was board certified in neurology in 1998.

Novella's academic specialization is in neurology, including more specifically, amyotrophic lateral sclerosis (ALS), myasthenia gravis and neuromuscular disorders, neurophysiology, and the treatment of hyperactive neurological disorders.

== Career ==
=== Skepticism and critical thinking ===
There is no skepticism without science and the scientific method. It's about how we know what we know.

— Steven Novella

Novella is a proponent of scientific skepticism. In 1996 Novella, his brother Bob, and Perry DeAngelis founded The Connecticut Skeptical Society. The group began to organize in late 1995, when DeAngelis and Novella noticed a lack of listings for their area in Skeptical Inquirer magazine.

The group later joined with the Skeptical Inquirers of New England (SINE) and the New Hampshire Skeptical Resource to form the New England Skeptical Society (NESS). Novella has served as the president of the NESS since inception.

Novella defines a skeptic as:

... one who prefers beliefs and conclusions that are reliable and valid to ones that are comforting or convenient, and therefore rigorously and openly applies the methods of science and reason to all empirical claims, especially their own. A skeptic provisionally proportions acceptance of any claim to valid logic and a fair and thorough assessment of available evidence, and studies the pitfalls of human reason and the mechanisms of deception so as to avoid being deceived by others or themselves. Skepticism values method over any particular conclusion.

In response to a 2007 editorial in The New York Times in which Paul Davies concluded "until science comes up with a testable theory of the laws of the universe, its claim to be free of faith is manifestly bogus," Novella said,

It's not actually true because science is not dependent upon faith in a naturalistic world. It just follows the methods as if it is naturalistic... it is not a system of beliefs. People often ask me and they will ask you as skeptics what do you believe? Well, it's not about belief. Do you believe in ESP? It doesn't matter if I believe in ESP. The only thing that matters is what is the evidence for ESP? ...It's very important I think to present skepticism as a method of inquiry not a set of conclusions, not a set of beliefs.

Novella is a fellow of the Committee for Skeptical Inquiry and has also been active in the organized skeptical community as a member of the executive committee of Northeast Conference on Science and Skepticism (NECSS).

=== Paranormal investigations ===
In the early days of the New England Skeptical Society, Novella participated in investigations of paranormal claims, some of which were part of the screening process for the One Million Dollar Paranormal Challenge offered by the James Randi Educational Foundation. Novella investigated such claims as Ouija boards (when the couple claiming they could operate one were properly blindfolded, their powers vanished), the ability to control the flipping of a coin (the claimant turned out to be making some common logical errors in thinking), a mind reader who got zero out of 20 correct, and many dowsers (typically found to be experiencing the Ideomotor phenomenon). Novella and the NESS also examined some phenomena described by people who were not competing for the One Million Dollar prize, such as haunted houses, the ability to communicate with the dead, and recording the voices of ghosts, known as electronic voice phenomenon, or EVP.

=== The Skeptics' Guide to the Universe podcast ===
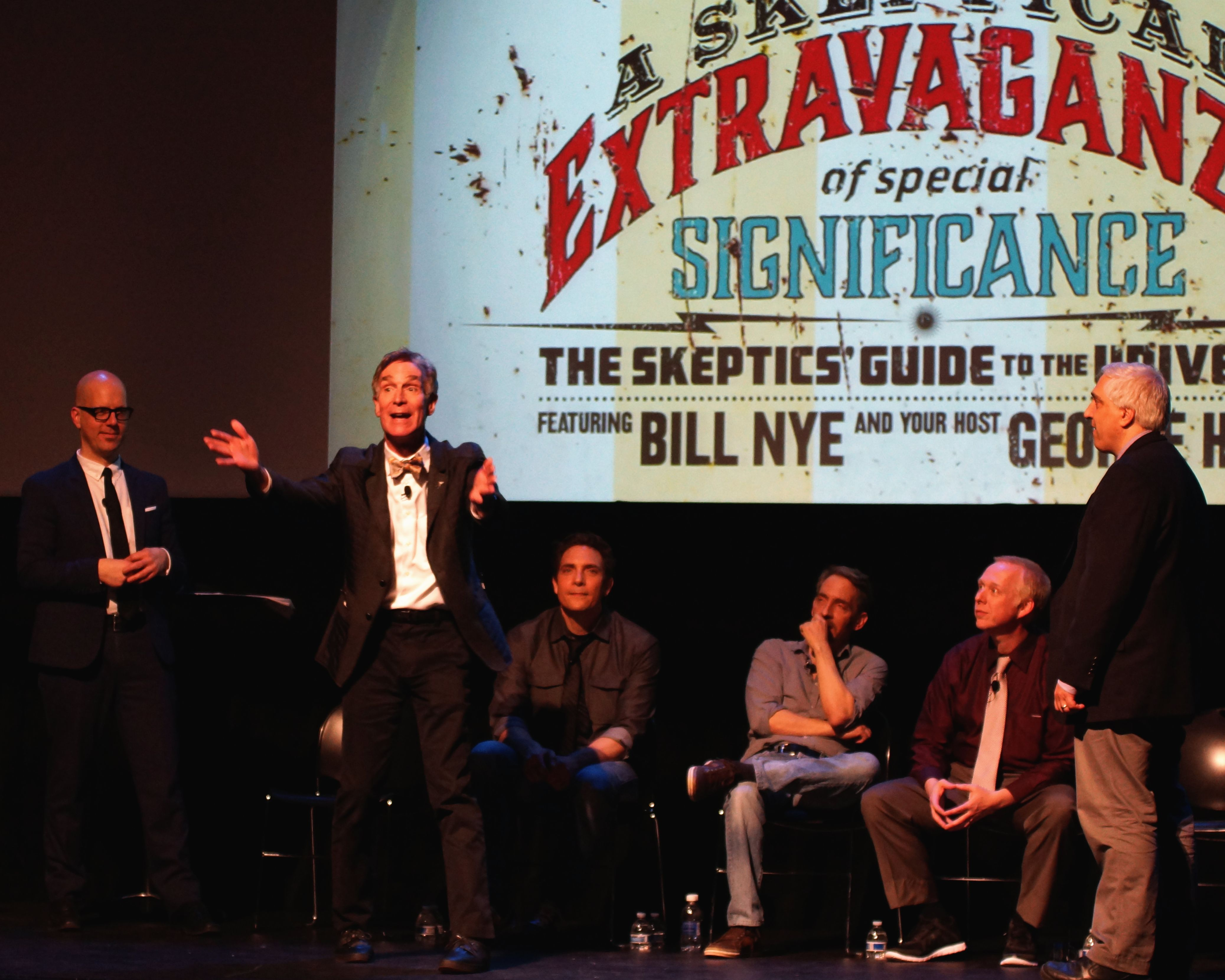
Bill Nye the Science Guy, Skeptics Guide to the Universe cast, and George Hrab, April 10, 2015, at F.I.T Haft Auditorium New York City.

In May 2005, Novella started The Skeptics' Guide to the Universe (SGU) podcast with Perry DeAngelis, Evan Bernstein, and his brothers Bob and Jay Novella. DeAngelis remained with the show until his death in August 2007. In July 2006, Rebecca Watson joined the podcast as a regular, staying through December 2014. Cara Santa Maria joined the cast in July 2015.

Novella hosts the show and handles editing and post-production. In an interview for the Books and Ideas podcast he described his work for the podcast as being a labor of love, and similar to a second job. Novella said the SGU show primarily addresses controversial topics and topics on fringe science, with common content on paranormal or conspiracy theories, health fraud, and issues of consumer protection.

=== Blogs ===
In 2007, Novella started a blog, Neurologica, for which he writes on a weekly basis covering subjects generally related to science or skepticism. He is the executive editor of the blog Science-Based Medicine for which he is also a regular contributor, and he is a medical advisor to Quackwatch, an alternative medicine watchdog website.

In 2008, Novella signed the Project Steve petition, a tongue-in-cheek parody of the list of "scientists that doubt evolution" produced by creationists.

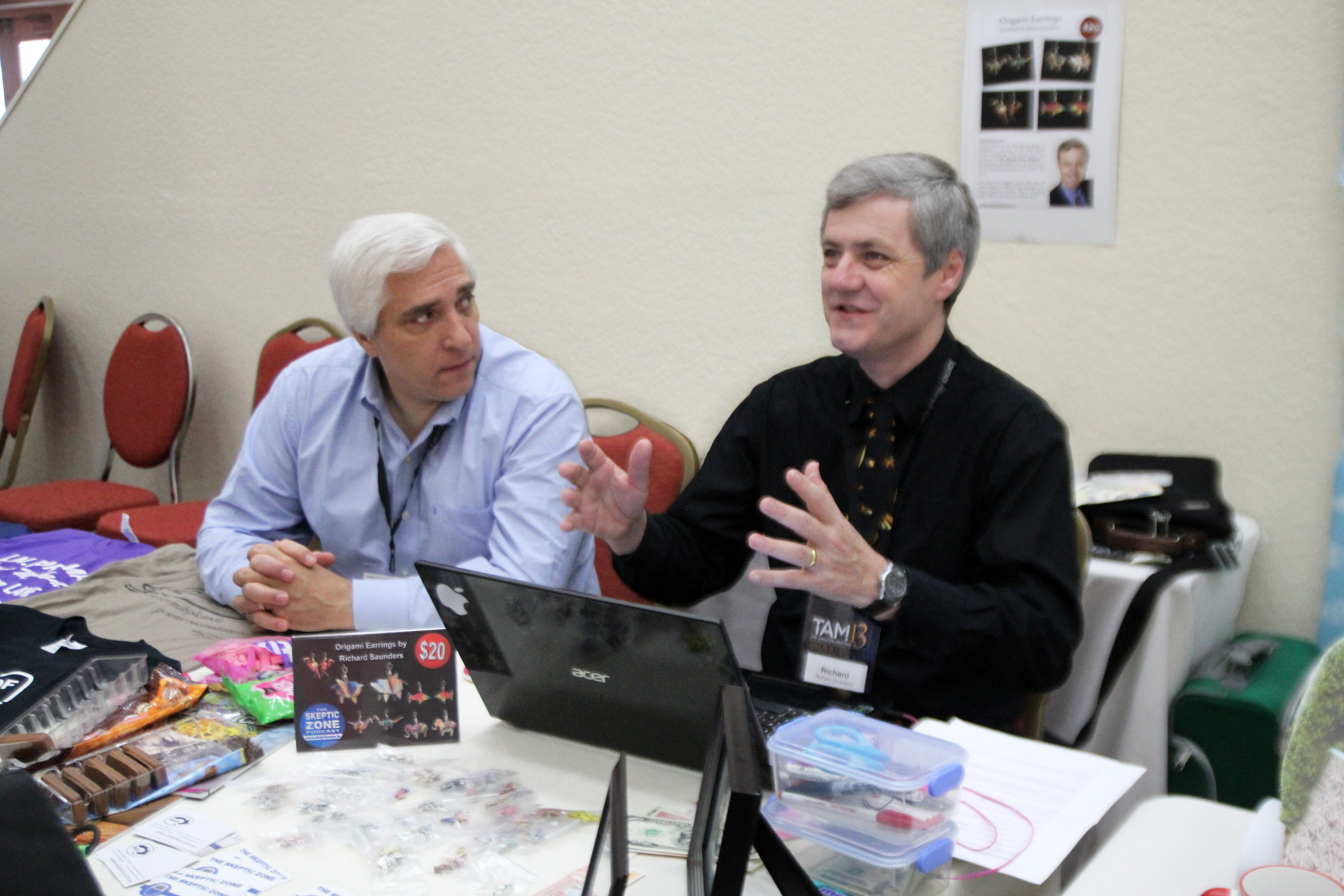
Steven Novella and Richard Saunders at TAM 13.

=== Print ===
Novella is an associate editor of the Scientific Review of Alternative Medicine, and writes the monthly Weird Science column for the New Haven Advocate newspaper. He created several Dungeons & Dragons campaign and expansion packs. Writing for Skeptical Inquirer, Rob Palmer stated in a review of Novella's book, The Skeptics' Guide to the Universe, that it could serve as a kind of "operations manual" for critical thinking and skepticism.

=== Television ===
Novella has appeared on several television programs, including Penn & Teller: Bullshit!, The Dr. Oz Show, and Inside Edition.

In 2008, he filmed a pilot for a television series called The Skeptologists along with Brian Dunning, Yau-Man Chan, Mark Edward, Michael Shermer, Phil Plait, and Kirsten Sanford. The series has not been picked up by any network.

==== The Dr. Oz Show appearance ====
Novella appeared on The Dr. Oz Show segment, "Controversial Medicine: Why your doctor is afraid of alternative health", where he was introduced as "an outspoken critic of alternative medicine." Novella noted that the term "alternative" creates a double standard. "There should be one science-based common-sense standard to figure out what therapies work and are safe." Novella made the point that herbs are medicinals and have been used that way for thousands of years, but the problem is in re-branding them as alternative, marketing them as natural, and therefore arguing that they don't need evidence that they are safe and effective. "At the end of the day, the public was sold products that the evidence shows doesn't work."

On the subject of acupuncture, Novella stated, "I've spent a lot of time reviewing the acupuncture literature ... and the evidence overwhelmingly shows that acupuncture, in fact, doesn't work." In response to Dr. Oz's complaint that Novella is dismissive of an idea that the "way we think [about acupuncture] in the west is that it can't be possible effective." Novella replied, "I didn't say it couldn't possibly work, I said when you look at it, it doesn't work."

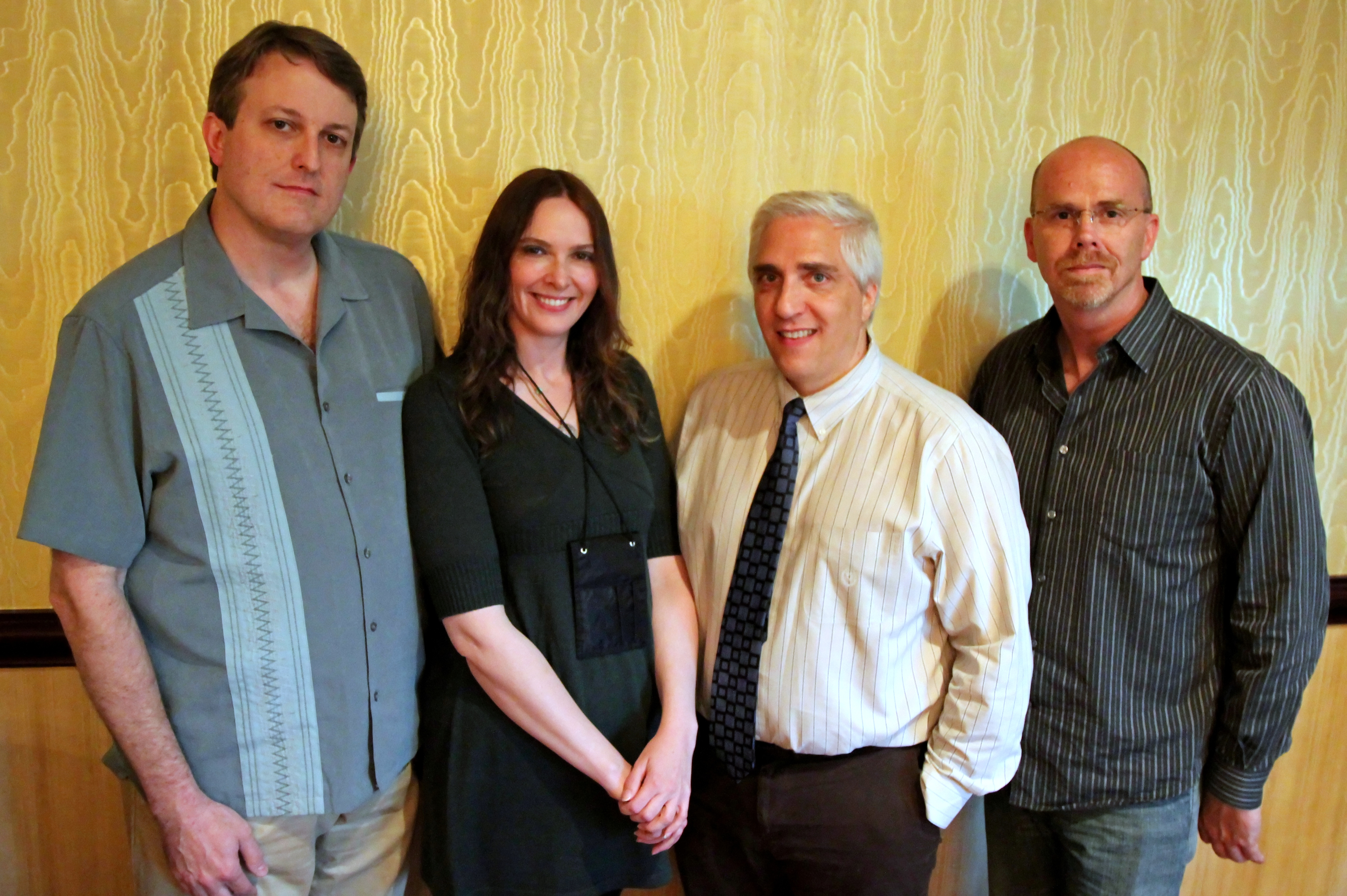
Tim Farley, Karen Stollznow, Novella and Ray Hall, TAM 9

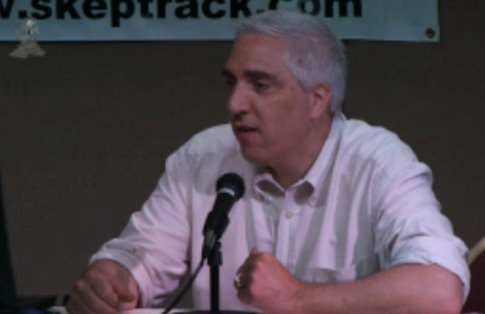
On Kylie Sturgess's podcast panel during Skeptrack at Dragon Con

=== Other work ===
Novella led two courses for The Great Courses, "Medical Myths, Lies, and Half-Truths: What We Think We Know May Be Hurting Us" and "Your Deceptive Mind: A Scientific Guide to Critical Thinking Skills".

In 2009, Novella was the board chairman when the Institute for Science in Medicine was founded.

In January 2010, Novella was elected as a Fellow of the Committee for Skeptical Inquiry.

In 2011, Novella was appointed Senior Fellow of the James Randi Educational Foundation, and Director of their Science-Based medicine project.

==== Adventure and role-playing games ====
Novella co-owned a local live action role-playing (LARP) game for about 5 years, during which time the owners wrote seven d20 System books.

Novella coauthored the adventure gaming book Twin Crowns, a naval and travel expansion for Dungeons & Dragons and Broadsides!, a role-playing game (RPG) based on the d20 System, and Spellbound: A Codex of Ritual Magic, which features "a complete system of magic suitable for any campaign setting" using that system.

==== Autonomous sensory meridian response ====
Novella published a reflective evaluation of the autonomous sensory meridian response, a low grade euphoria characterized by 'a combination of positive feelings, relaxation, and a distinct static-like tingling sensation on the skin', which begins on the scalp before moving down the spine to the base of the neck, sometimes spreading to the back, arms and legs, often prompted by specific acoustic and visual stimuli including the content of some digital videos, and less commonly by intentional attentional control.

In a post on Neurologica, Novella said that he investigates such phenomena by asking 'Is it real'? Regarding ASMR, he said: 'I don't think there is a definitive answer, but I am inclined to believe that it is. There are a number of people who seem to have independently [...] experienced and described' it with 'fairly specific details. In this way' ASMR is 'similar to migraine headaches – we know they exist as a syndrome primarily because many different people report the same constellation of symptoms and natural history.' He suggested that ASMR might be a type of pleasurable seizure or another way to activate the 'pleasure response' and advised that functional magnetic resonance imaging and transcranial magnetic stimulation technologies should be used to study the brains of people who experience ASMR in comparison to people who do not, as a way of seeking better scientific understanding of the phenomenon.

== Tobinick lawsuit ==
On June 9, 2014, Edward Tobinick filed a civil action in Florida Southern District Court naming Steven Novella, Yale University, the Society for Science-Based Medicine, Inc. and SGU Productions, LLC as defendants. The action alleged that in violation of the Lanham Act, Novella "has and continues to publish a false advertisement disparaging Plaintiffs entitled 'Enbrel for Stroke and Alzheimer's', ('the 'Advertisement') and implying that the INR plaintiffs' use of Etanercept is ineffective and useless;" and "The Advertisement is extremely inflammatory and defamatory in nature as it contains multiple false and misleading statements of fact regarding Plaintiffs." "The Advertisement" referred to in the action is an entry for the Science-Based Medicine blog that Novella wrote and posted on May 8, 2013.

On July 14, 2014, Novella's attorney, Marc Randazza, filed an "Opposition to Plaintiff's Motion for Temporary and Preliminary Injunctive Relief". The filing stated that Tobinick was "highly unlikely to prevail in this matter ... as Defendant's statements range from provably true to opinion," that a preliminary injunction "would impose an unlawful prior restraint of speech," and that "an injunction would result in far more harm to Defendants and the public than Plaintiffs' claimed injury." Novella posted a response to the lawsuit on Science-Based Medicine in which he said, "In my opinion he [Tobinick] is using legal thuggery in an attempt to intimidate me and silence my free speech because he finds its content inconvenient".

United States District Judge Robin Rosenberg ordered the case closed on September 30, 2015, and found in judgement for the defendants. Tobinick was unable to show that Novella had profited from his blog post or that it was an advertisement. In 2017, a final appeal affirmed the district court's opinion.

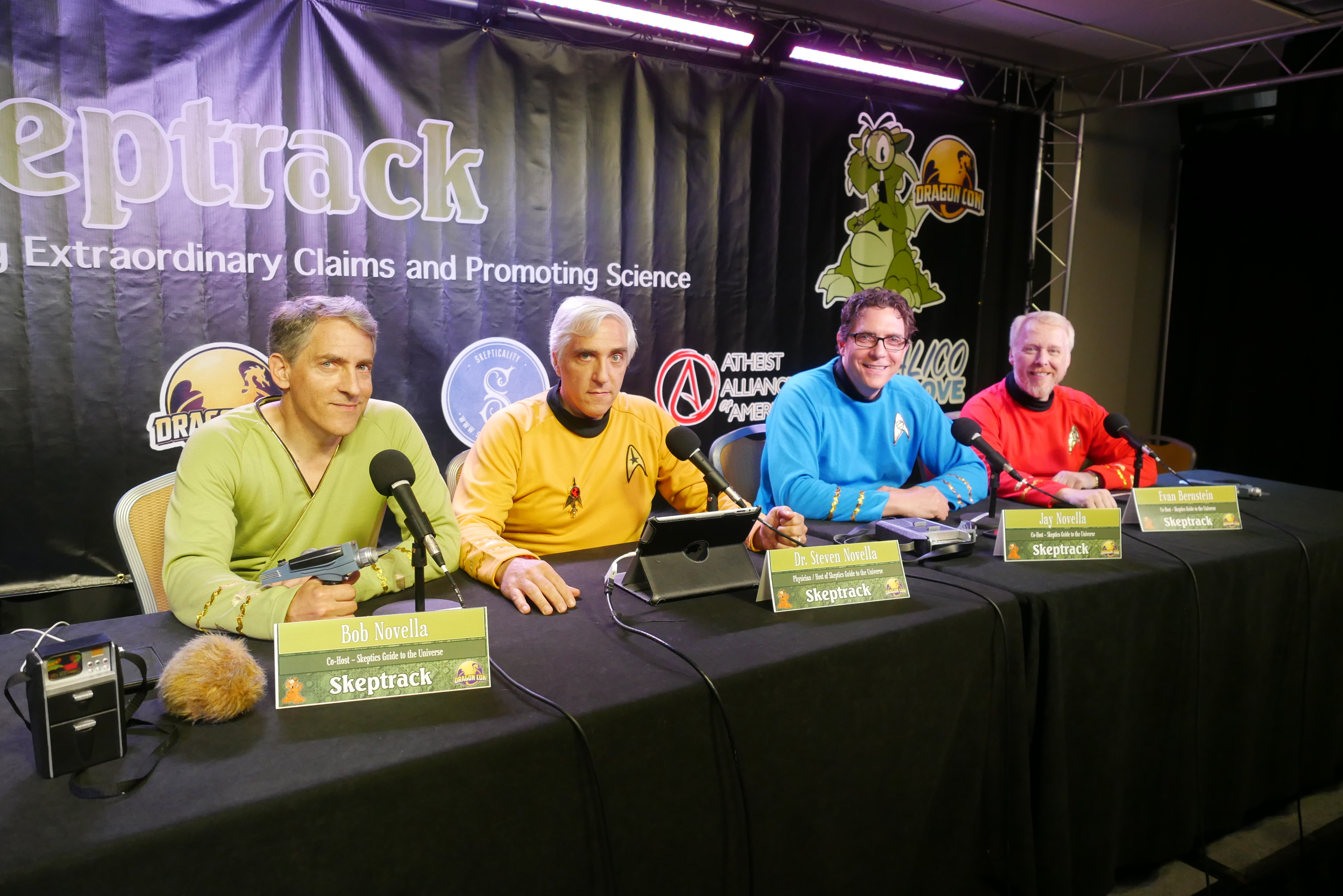
Bob Novella, Steve Novella, Jay Novella and Evan Bernstein at DragonCon 2018, sporting Star Trek costumes.

== Awards ==
- In 2010 the Committee for Skeptical Inquiry (CSICOP) awarded Novella the Robert P. Balles Prize for Critical Thinking for his body of work including The Skeptics' Guide to the Universe podcast, Science-Based Medicine, Neurologica, Skepticial Inquirer column "The Science of Medicine" and the "tireless travel and lecture schedule on behalf of skepticism". "The truly most amazing thing is he does this all on a volunteer basis." According to Barry Karr "You may be the hardest worker in all of skepticism."
- In 2019 Novella became a Fellow for the German Skeptic group Gesellschaft zur wissenschaftlichen Untersuchung von Parawissenschaften GWUP

== Topics of interest ==
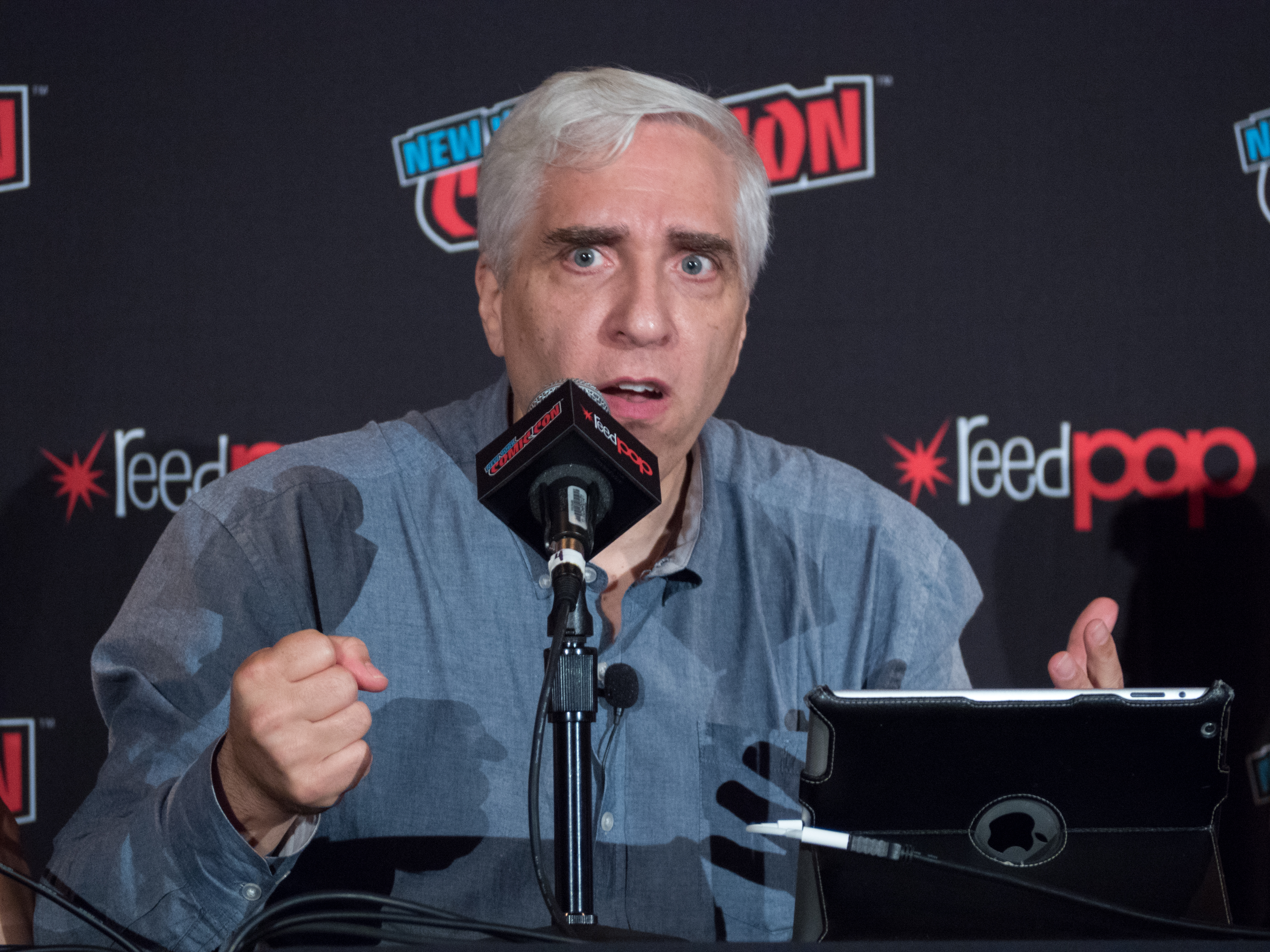
Novella leading a panel about bad science in science fiction at New York Comic Con in 2018

Novella often writes and speaks about a variety of topics in areas of alternative medicine, the new age movement, parapsychology, and pseudoscience. As a proponent of scientific skepticism, his writings generally address supporting evidence and scientific consensus. Topics addressed in his writings include:

- Complementary and alternative medicine (CAM) – Alternative medicine is any practice that is put forward as having the healing effects of medicine but is not based on evidence gathered using the scientific method. It consists of a wide range of health care practices, products and therapies. Novella has often said, "CAM is CAM because it is not science-based. If it were, it would not be 'alternative' medicine, it would be medicine."
- Vaccines and autism – There is no evidence of a causal relationship between vaccinations and autism. Despite this, many parents believe that vaccinations cause autism and therefore delay or avoid immunizing their children under the "vaccine overload" hypothesis even though this hypothesis has no scientific evidence and is biologically implausible. Novella sums it up, "With regard to vaccines, the data is there, published in the peer-reviewed literature. Many professional groups have thoroughly analyzed the literature and independently concluded that vaccines are safe and effective."
- Homeopathy – Homeopathy is a system of alternative medicine created in 1796 by Samuel Hahnemann, based on the doctrine that like cures like, according to which a substance that causes the symptoms of a disease in healthy people will cure similar symptoms in sick people. The remedies are prepared by repeatedly diluting a chosen substance in alcohol or distilled water, followed by forceful striking on an elastic body. Dilution usually continues well past the point where no molecules of the original substance remain. Novella wrote, "I would like people to be aware of the fact that homeopathy is a pre-scientific philosophy, that it is based entirely on magical thinking and is out of step with the last 200 years of science. People should know that typical homeopathic remedies are diluted to the point that no active ingredient remains, and that homeopaths invoke mysterious vibrations or implausible and highly fanciful water chemistry. I would further like people to know that clinical research with homeopathic remedies, when taken as a whole, show no effect for any such remedy."
- AIDS denialism – HIV/AIDS denialism is the belief, contradicted by conclusive medical and scientific evidence, that human immunodeficiency virus (HIV) does not cause acquired immune deficiency syndrome (AIDS). Novella wrote, "Denialists are pseudoskeptics – they pretend to apply the principles of skepticism (doubt) but they are dedicated to a final conclusion, and so they twist the process to their desired outcome."
- Near-death experience – A near-death experience (NDE) refers to personal experiences associated with impending death, encompassing multiple possible sensations including detachment from the body, feelings of levitation, total serenity, security, warmth, the experience of absolute dissolution, and the presence of a light. In an article for ABC News, Novella is quoted as saying, "That NDEs occur is not controversial – many people report remembering experiences around the time of cardiac arrest from which they were revived. . . the question is how to interpret them. ...The burden of proof for anyone claiming that NDEs are evidence for the survival of the self beyond the physical function of the brain is to rule out other more prosaic explanations. This burden has not been met."
- Hologram bracelets – A hologram bracelet or power bracelet is a small rubber wristband fitted with a hologram. Manufacturers have said that the holograms "optimise the natural flow of energy around the body, and so improve an athlete's strength, balance and flexibility". Appearing on an episode of the television show Inside Edition Novella was asked if he believed the claims of makers of power bracelets. He replied, "Not for a second. That is based upon nothing. That is literally made up marketing hype."
- Intelligent design – Of creationists' world-view, Novella writes, "it is not about evidence or logic, it is about authority. The debate is framed as God's authority vs man's authority, not in terms of logic or evidence."
- Conspiracy theories – In June 2014, Novella conducted a written debate with Michael Fullerton, "who believes that the collapse of the Twin Towers on 9/11 was not due to the official story of damage from the impact of commercial jets, but rather the result of a controlled demolition." In Novella's first response he concluded, "Michael's core logical error in making his case is depending on the claim that the towers fell in a manner that looks like controlled demolition, in that they fell fast and mostly straight down. These are not, however, features specific to controlled demolition. They would be true regardless of what initiated the collapse of such structures."
- Post-truth – Speaking at CSIcon Las Vegas 2017, Novella described the arc of skepticism beginning with a focus on classic pseudoscience such as UFOs and psychics which evolved over time to science denialism and a rise in "alternative medicine". Novella stated that we now live in a post-truth world "where you don't have to defend your facts." He believes this can be countered by active skeptics, "You have to understand where people are coming from. You have to give them an alternative narrative."

== Bibliography ==
A book written by Steve Novella and his Skeptics' Guide co-hosts about scientific skepticism was published in October 2018. The Skeptics' Guide to the Universe: How to Know What's Really Real in a World Increasingly Full of Fake was reviewed by Publishers Weekly, which said: "In plain English and cogent prose, Novella makes skepticism seem mighty, necessary, and accessible all at once... Empowering and illuminating, this thinker's paradise is an antidote to spreading anti-scientific sentiments. Readers will return to its ideas again and again." The subsections of the book ("Neuropsycholological Humility", "Metacognition", "Science and Pseudoscience", and "Iconic Cautionary Tales from History") break the topic into conceptional chunks that are easy for readers with a wide range of backgrounds to digest.

Neil deGrasse Tyson's review says: "Thorough, informative, and enlightening, The Skeptics' Guide to the Universe inoculates you against the frailties and shortcomings of human cognition. If this book does not become required reading for us all, we may well see modern civilization unravel before our eyes."

Steven, Bob, and Jay Novella published The Skeptics' Guide to the Future in 2022.
