= New England Skeptical Society =

American educational organization

- From NECSS 2013
- Formation: 1996; 30 years ago
- Location: New England
- President: Steven Novella
- Website: www.theness.com

The New England Skeptical Society (NESS) is an American organization dedicated to promoting science and reason. It was founded in January 1996 as the Connecticut Skeptical Society, by Steven Novella, Perry DeAngelis and Bob Novella. The group later joined with the Skeptical Inquirers of New England (SINE) and the New Hampshire Skeptical Resource to form the New England Skeptical Society.

== Origins ==
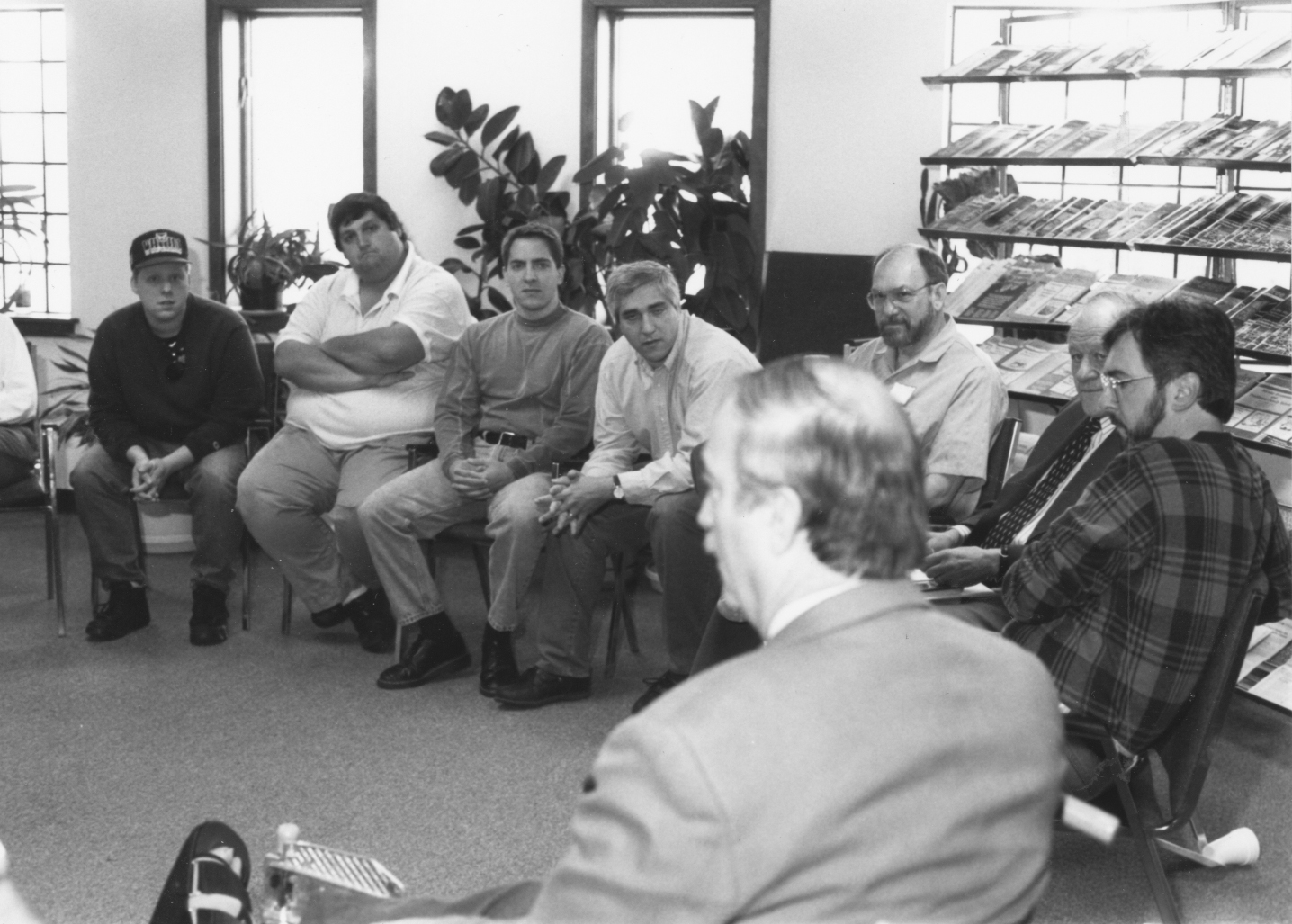
The New England Skeptical Society attending a conference at CSICOP in 1997 (left to right) Evan Bernstein, Perry DeAngelis, Bob Novella, Steven Novella, unknown, Paul Kurtz, Barry Karr, Joe Nickell

In 1995, Perry DeAngelis and Steven Novella, both readers of Skeptical Inquirer, sought to form a local skeptics group in Connecticut after noticing a lack of listings in that magazine for their area. In 1996, DeAngelis, and brothers Steven Novella and Bob Novella, founded the Connecticut Skeptical Society, a precursor to the New England Skeptical Society. In October 1996, Novella appeared on the Ricki Lake talk show. The topic was vampires, and one guest claimed to be a psychic vampire that could drain people's minds. From the audience, DeAngelis stood to confront the guest and said "Drain me". In response, the psychic claimed that their ability did not work in public.

The group later joined with the Skeptical Inquirers of New England (SINE) and the New Hampshire Skeptical Resource. In October 1997, the group registered as the New England Skeptical Society INC for tax exempt status.

The New England Skeptical Society (NESS) has hosted local lectures on skeptical topics and conducted investigations into local paranormal claims such as Satanism, homeopathy, dowsing, cults and UFOs.

== Investigations ==
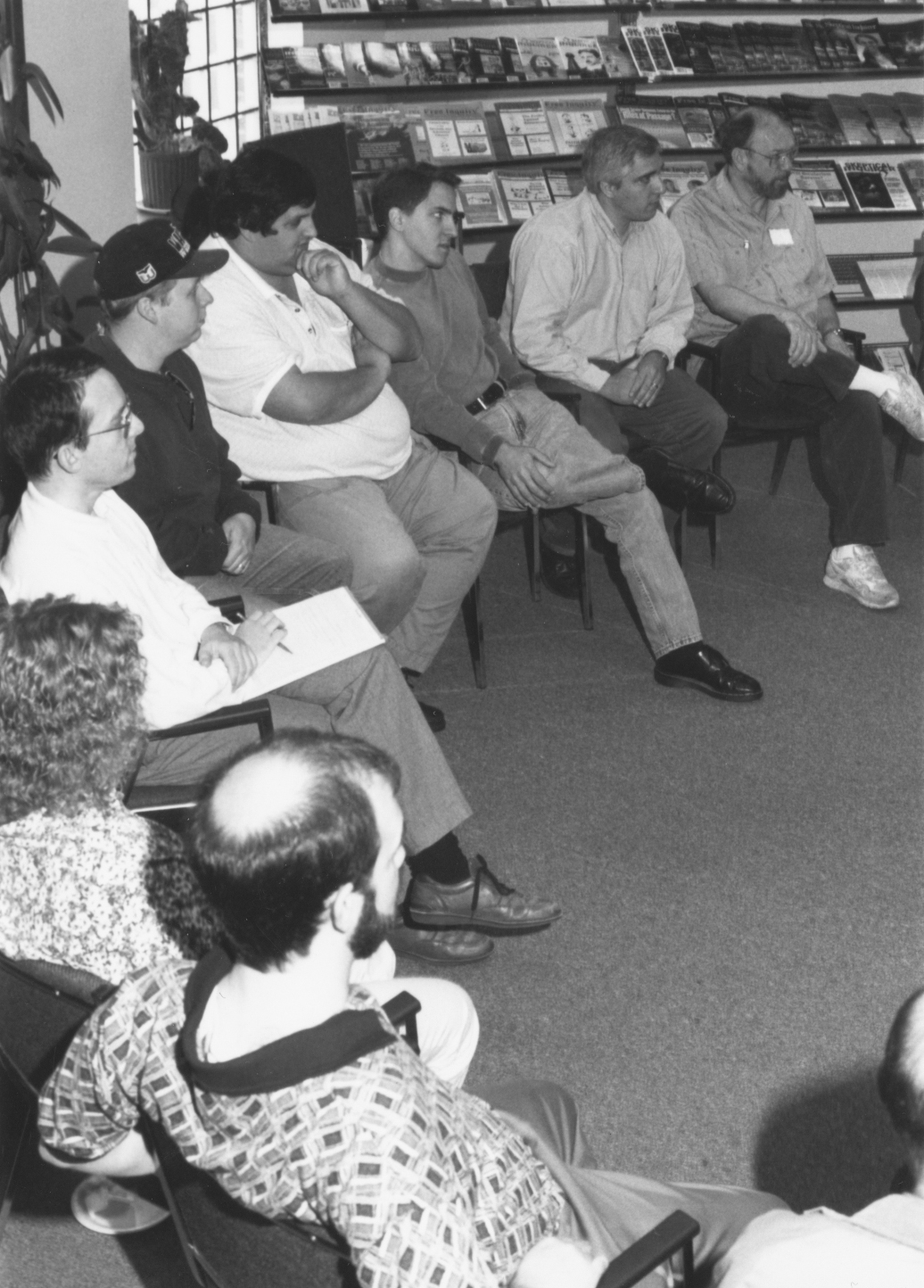
The New England Skeptical Society attending a conference at CSICOP in 1997 - (bottom to top) unknown, unknown, John Kane, Evan Bernstein, Perry DeAngelis, Bob Novella, Steven Novella, unknown

One of the NESS team's more extensive investigations was of Ed and Lorraine Warren who also live in Connecticut. Novella and DeAngelis asked and were promised that they would be allowed to follow along on one of the Warren's investigations, but were repeatedly turned down with different excuses. NESS believes that the Warren's were more interested in protecting their reputation and not scientific advancement. When confronted about their lack of scientific rigor, Ed Warren stated '“you can’t have scientific evidence for a spiritual phenomenon.”' At the conclusion of the NESS investigation of the Warrens, Steven Novella writes, "What they are really hunting for are anomalies – anything even slightly strange. In the ghost-hunting world, anomaly = ghost. Scientific investigation does not enter into the equation."

One of DeAngelis' and Steven Novella's investigations was used in a newspaper analysis of how much truth lay beneath the events portrayed in the movie The Conjuring: "They (The Warrens) claim to have scientific evidence which does indeed prove the existence of ghosts, which sounds like a testable claim into which we can sink our investigative teeth. What we found was a very nice couple, some genuinely sincere people, but absolutely no compelling evidence...."

One ghost hunting group claimed that during a ghost investigation one of the team vanished. NESS was able to borrow the VHS tape for examination. They gave the tape to a technician, who ran the tape on a special machine that allows viewing beyond what is normally seen on a TV monitor screen and showed that someone had been standing next to the camera when the crew member disappeared. The crew member was interviewed and said he did not disappear. All the evidence shows that the camera was turned on and off and no one disappeared.

NESS is critical of ghost hunting groups that claim to be doing scientific work; Novella has said they should "stop saying [they're] doing science, [and] making a mockery of the scientific method."

The NESS is affiliated with the James Randi Educational Foundation (JREF) and had acted as a tester for the Million Dollar Paranormal Challenge prior to its dissolution in 2015. According to Steven Novella, "paranormal claims... represent an opportunity for the skeptical community to teach the public about the proper methods of science, the pitfalls of illogic and self-deception, and the reality of fraud for self-promotion."

On Halloween 1996, NESS was called in to work with a paranormal team to decide if a home was indeed haunted, NESS member Robert Novella created a team of skeptics to investigate. A local radio station was offering a $5,000 prize for evidence of a genuinely haunted house. The New England Society of Psychical Research (NESPR) a group closely affiliated with the Warrens, were also on hand. The home owner "Mary" claimed to have been visited by various ghosts her whole life. Photographs were taken, which were later revealed to be black photos taken in a dark room.

DeAngelis had been told since he was a boy that Newtown, Connecticut was a hotbed for Satanists. After hearing rumors of fresh cases of Satanism in Newtown, DeAngelis spent several days researching on the Internet, and came up with nothing. He researched online and traveled to Newtown to search through the archives of the town newspaper The Newtown Bee, and found nothing concerning Satanism. DeAngelis interviewed the Police Communications Officer who said that there was to his knowledge no Satanic activity happening in Newtown.

== Northeast Conference on Science and Skepticism ==
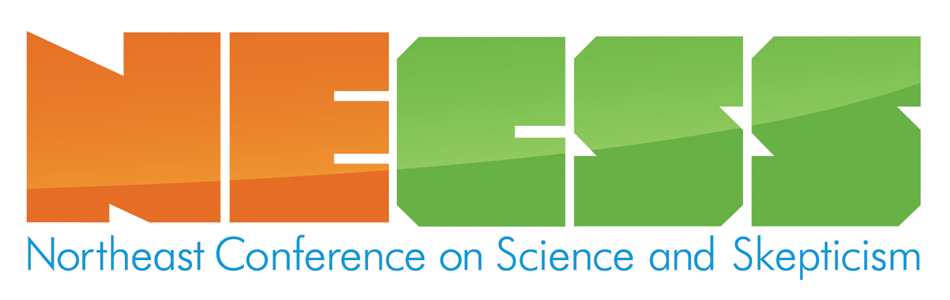
NECSS logo.

According to Steven Novella and Evan Bernstein, the NESS was asked to speak for the New York Skeptics, September 12, 2009. That lecture was a tribute to Perry DeAngelis, and as it was near the anniversary of both his birth and death in August, they continued the tradition of celebrating him at each conference. Even after the Northeast Conference on Science and Skepticism (NECSS) organizers decided to move the conference to April, the SGU continues to celebrate the life of DeAngelis each year during their panel.

== Blogs ==
Novella states that he started Neurologica and Science-Based Medicine blogs just after the Podcast started to take off after the first year. His reasoning was that he really enjoyed podcasting, but "there were certain advantages to the written form." He feels that "both podcasting and blogging are both powerful ways to communicating science and skepticism." Oftentimes he will first write the blog, and then will talk about it on the podcast after getting feedback from the blog readers. Blogging is also a way of "crowd-sourcing" as readers may point him to studies and other articles that he wasn't aware of before.

NeuroLogica Blog "is a daily blog authored by NESS president, Steven Novella, covering science, skepticism, neuroscience, and critical thinking."

NESS owns and operates Science-Based Medicine (SBM), a blog dedicated to issues of medicine and science. SBM features health care experts in a variety of fields. Starting in 2015, SBM became a sponsor of NECSS. Editors have included Steven Novella, David Gorski, Kimball Atwood, Mark Crislip, Harriet Hall and Paul Ingraham.
