= The Skeptics' Guide to the Universe =

American science and skepticism podcast

- Genre: Science and skepticism

Cast and voices
- Hosted by: Steven Novella; Jay Novella; Bob Novella; Cara Santa Maria

Publication
- No. of episodes: 1068
- Original release: May 4, 2005
- Updates: Weekly

Reception
- Ratings: 4.53125/5

Related
- Website: theskepticsguide.org

The Skeptics' Guide to the Universe (SGU) is an American weekly skeptical podcast hosted by Steven Novella along with a panel of contributors. The official podcast of the New England Skeptical Society, it was named to evoke The Hitchhiker's Guide to the Galaxy. The show features discussions of recent scientific developments in layman's terms, and interviews authors, people in the area of science, and other famous skeptics. The SGU podcast includes discussions of myths, conspiracy theories, pseudoscience, the paranormal, and other forms of superstition, from the point of view of scientific skepticism.

== Hosts ==
The SGU podcast was first released in May 2005. The original lineup of the podcast consisted of the Novella brothers, Steven Novella, Robert "Bob" Novella and Jay Novella, along with Evan Bernstein, and Perry DeAngelis. DeAngelis contributed until his death in 2007, shortly before his 44th birthday. Rebecca Watson joined in 2006 and later left the podcast in 2014. Cara Santa Maria joined the cast in July 2015. Bernstein resigned from the SGU in June 2026.

The podcast is affiliated with the New England Skeptical Society and with the SGU Productions LLC.

Until late 2018 there were no full-time employees of the podcast. Co-host Jay Novella stated that this was partially a result of the financial drain from a protracted defamation lawsuit, filed by Edward Tobinick, which had "consumed financial resources that would have otherwise been available" for hiring staff. The transition to full-time status for Jay Novella was a result of three concurrent factors in 2018: the favorable resolution of the lawsuit, the end of Novella's existing career job, and the podcast successfully reaching its funding goal of over 3,000 patrons on Patreon. As the podcast's first full-time employee, Novella's role expanded beyond co-host and website manager to focus on business operations, project management, and growing the podcast's audience, which included launching a new website and newsletter.

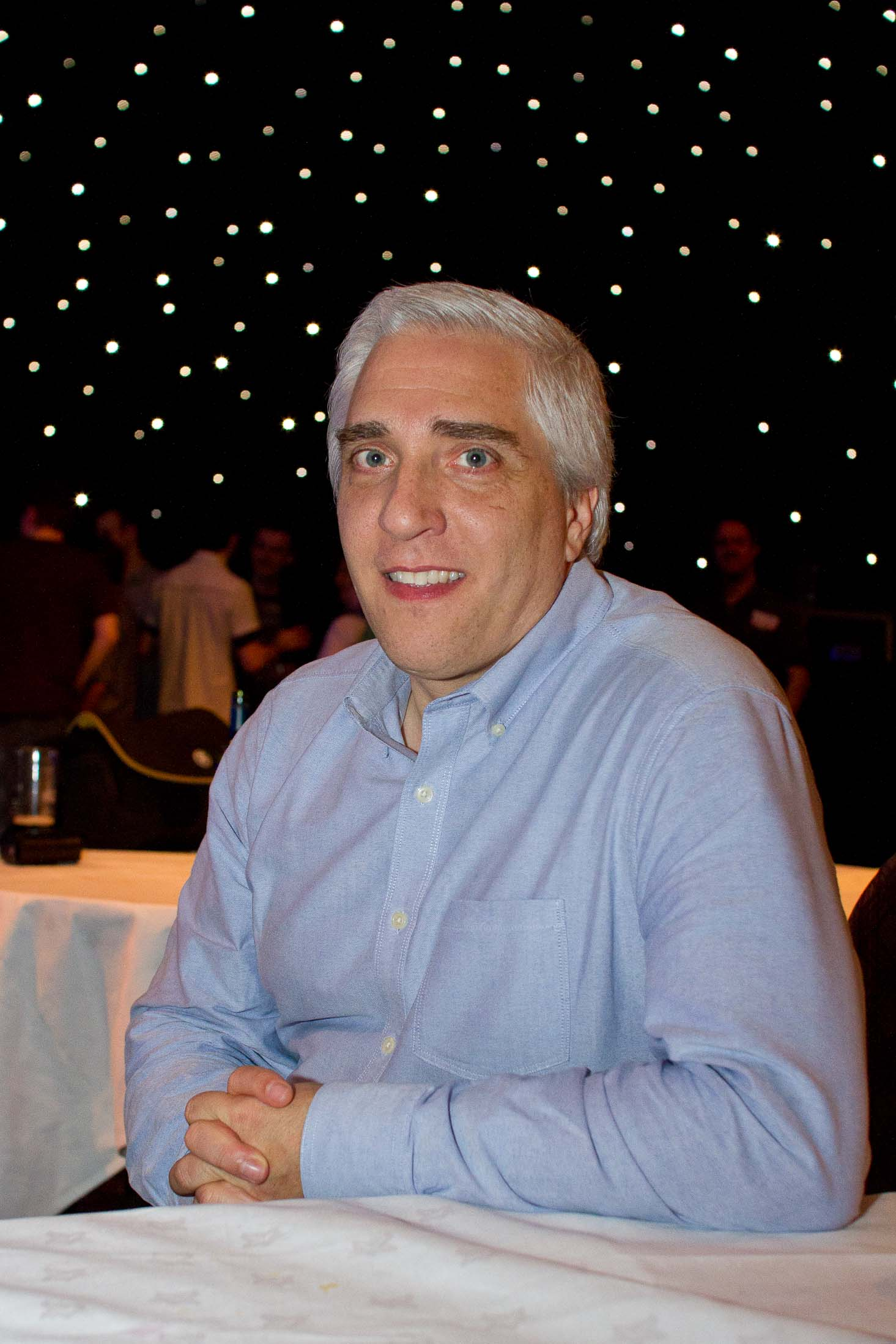
Steve Novella, 2011

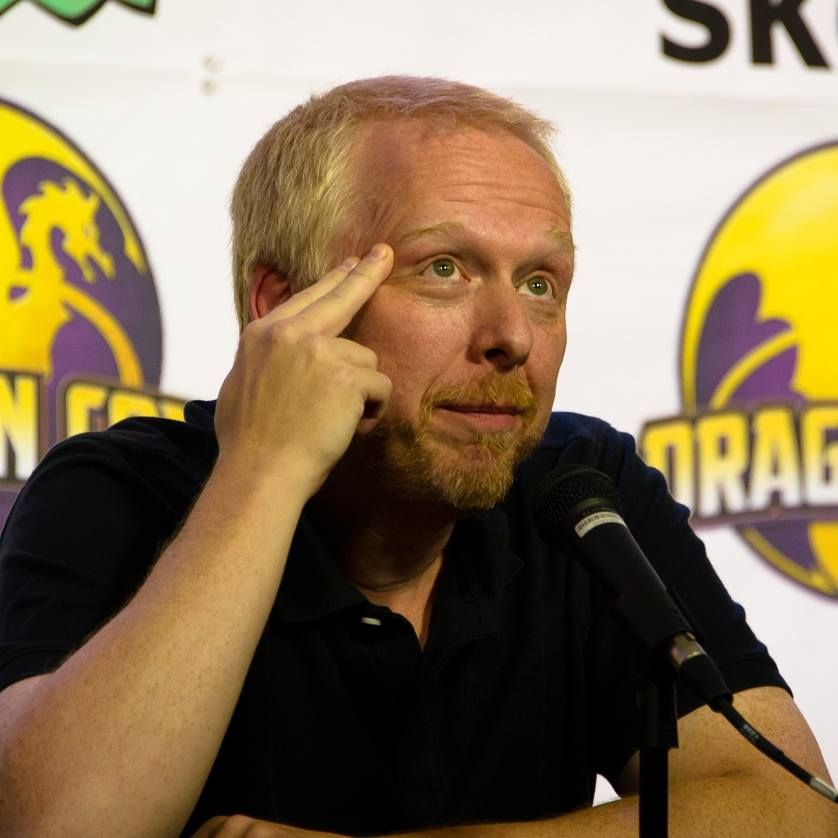
Evan Bernstein, 2015

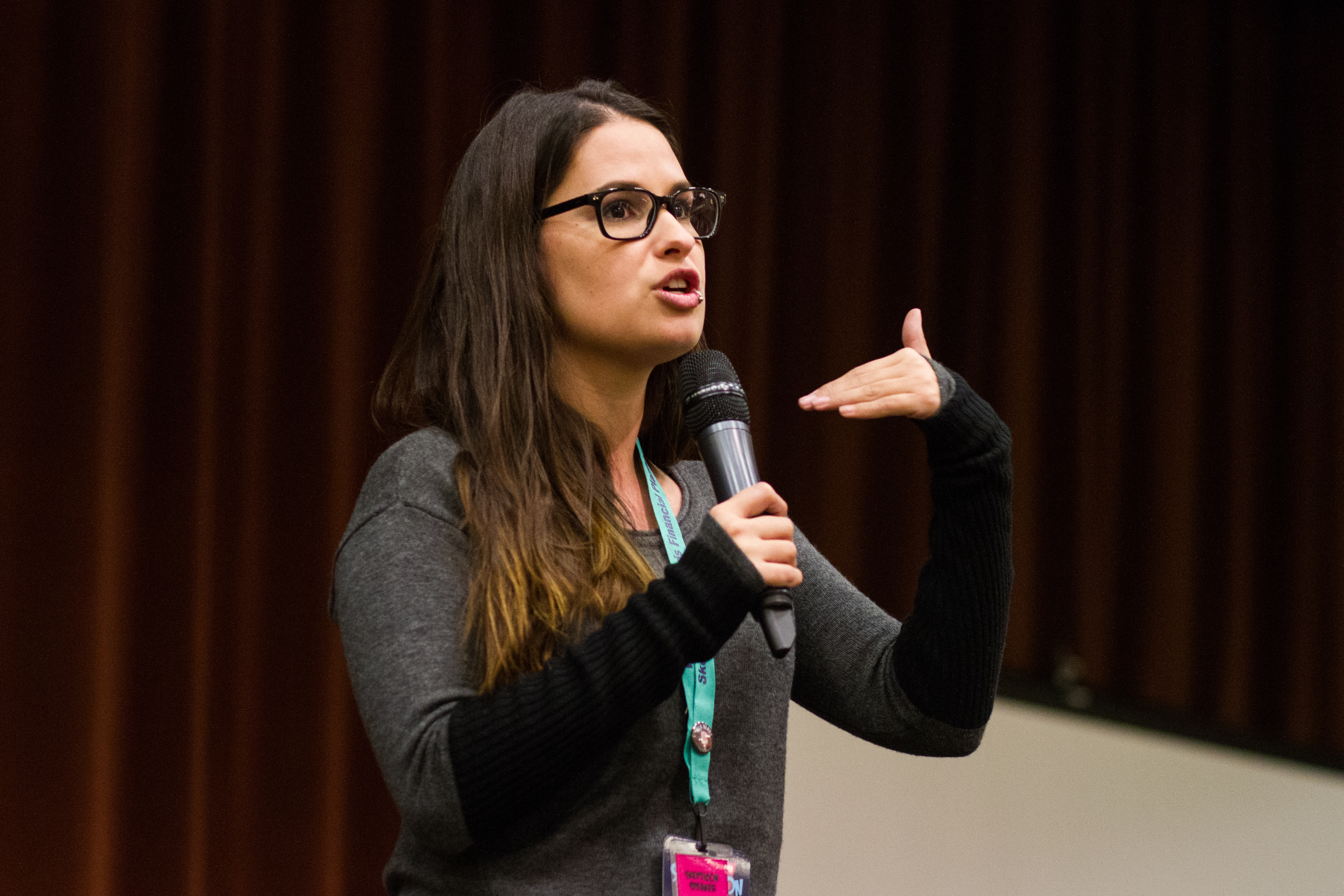
Cara Santa Maria, 2014

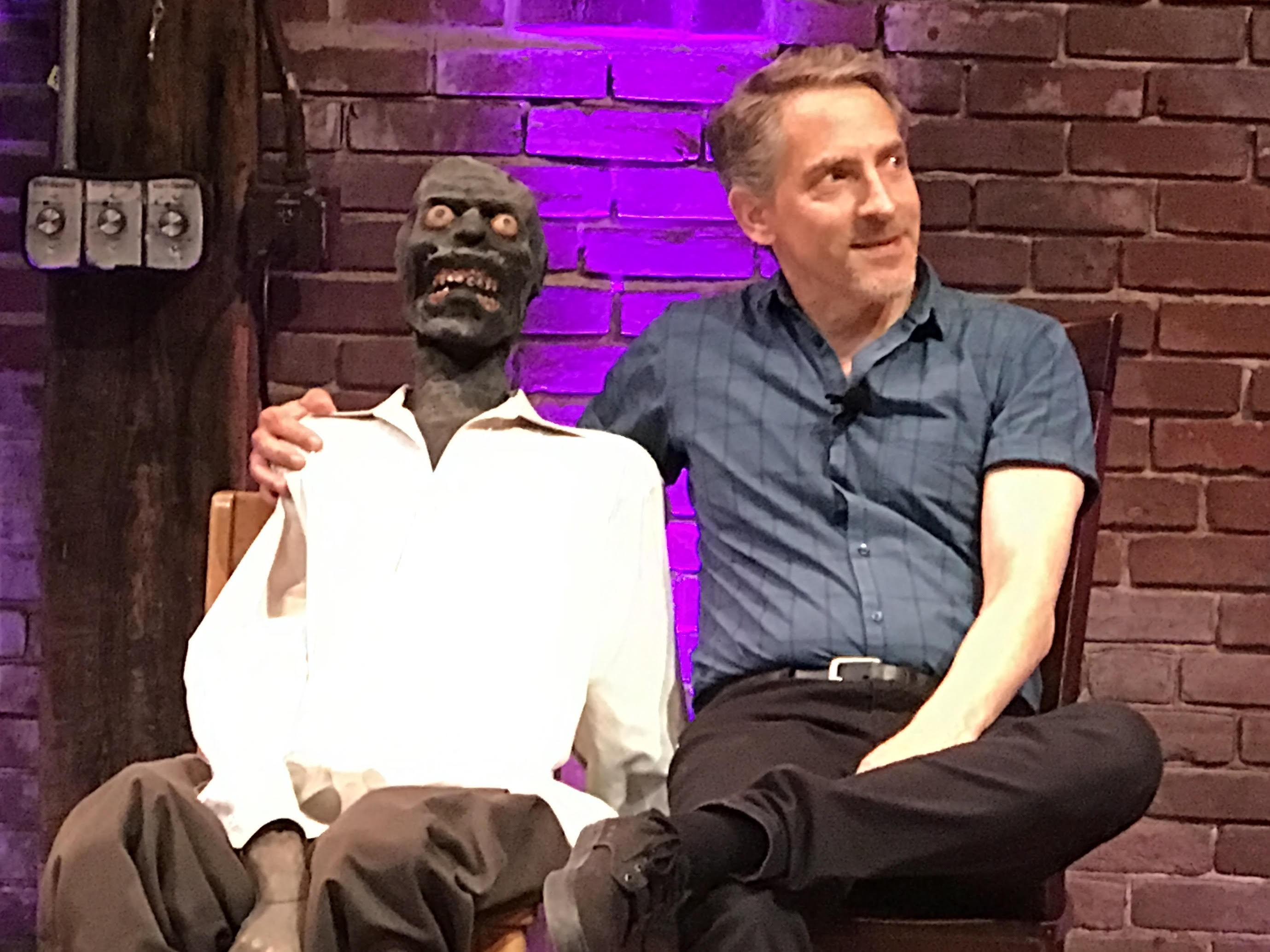
Bob Novella (right) with prop during a live show, 2019

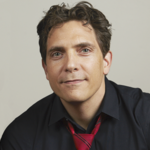
Jay Novella, 2015

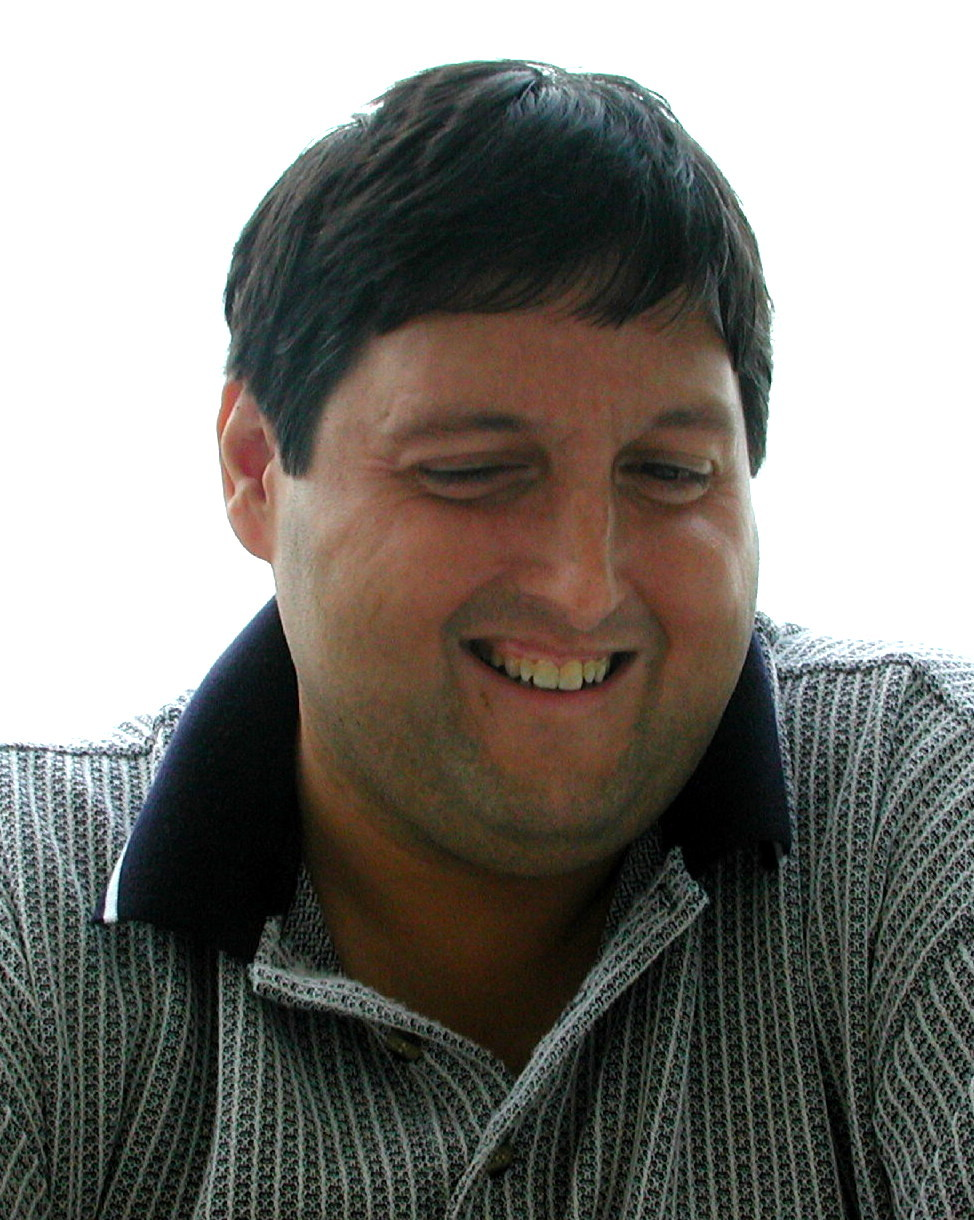
Perry DeAngelis, 2000

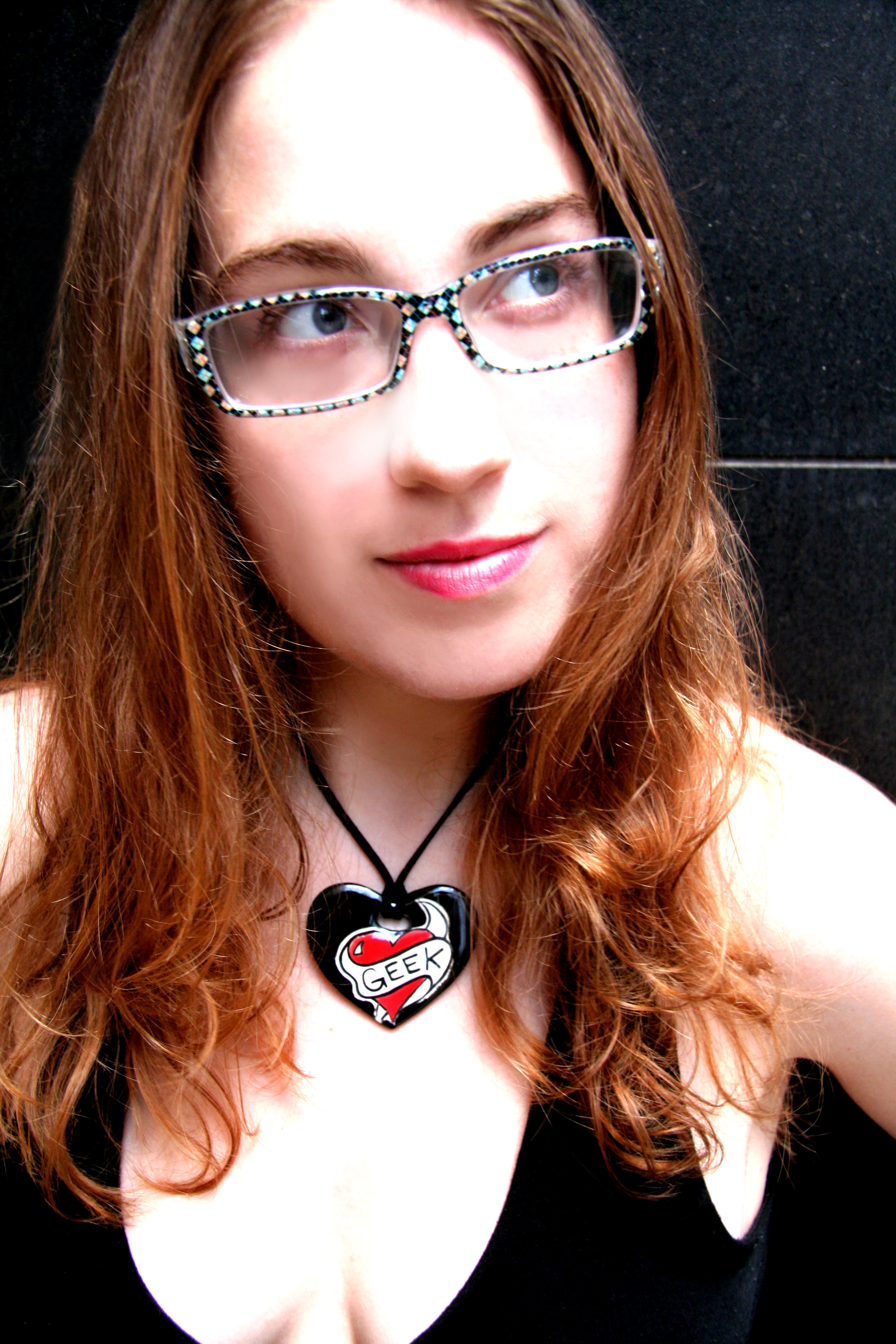
Rebecca Watson, 2009

== Production ==
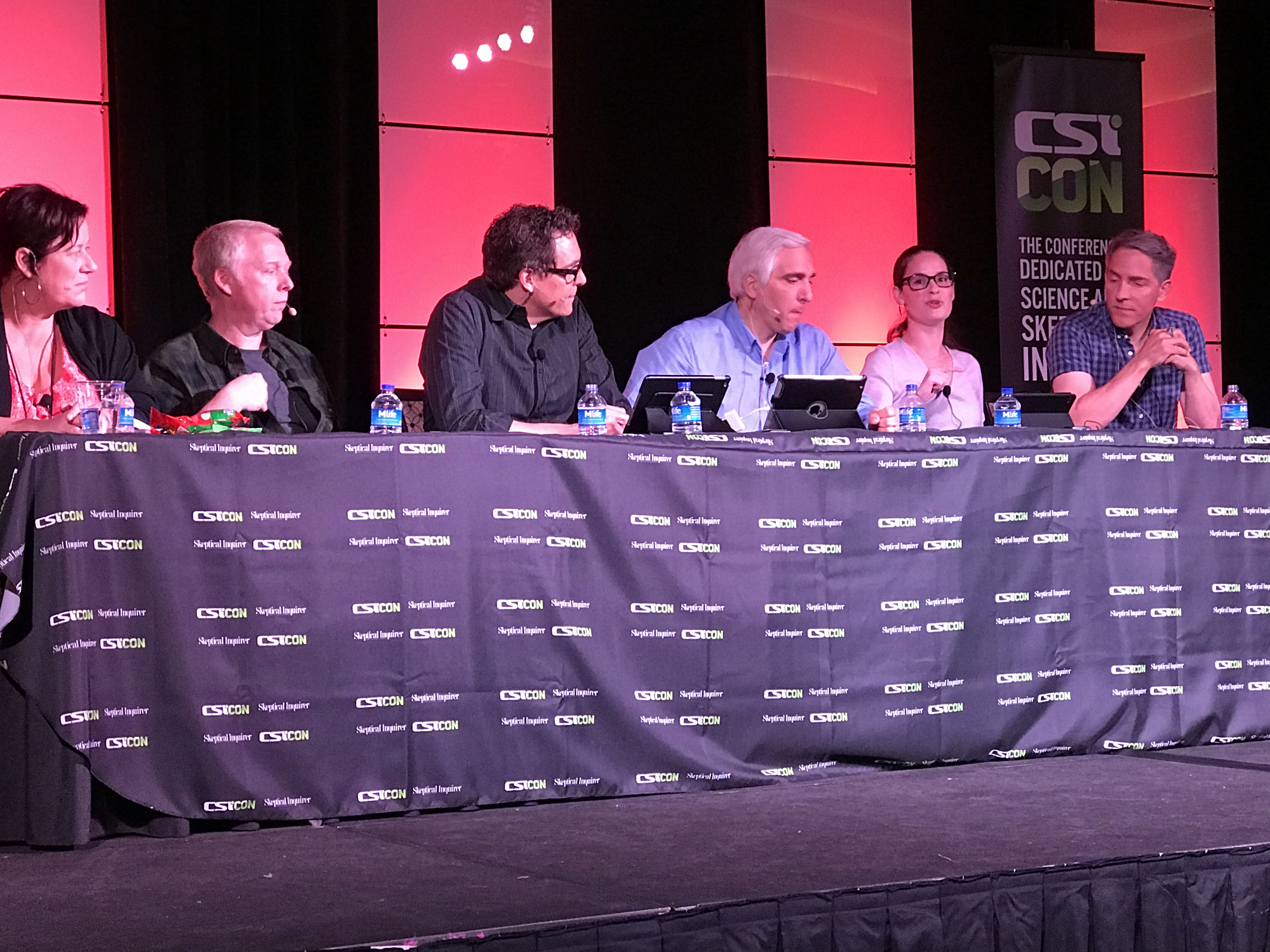
SGU live recording at CSICon 2017 in Las Vegas. From left to right: Rachael Dunlop (guest), Evan Bernstein, Jay Novella, Steven Novella, Cara Santa Maria, and Bob Novella.

Segments include interviews, discussions of significant but largely unknown figures in science ("Forgotten Superheroes of Science"), and games played with the audience or between the panelists, such as "Science or Fiction" and "Who's That Noisy?". The show typically closes with a "Skeptical Quote" read by a host.

Most episodes last approximately 80 minutes. On September 23, 2011, the SGU produced a 24-hour live podcast titled "SGU-24" to mark the year 2012 approaching (referencing the 2012 phenomenon), featuring contributions from skeptics worldwide.

=== Theme music ===
The show's theme music is "Theorem" by the San Francisco rock band, Kineto. The theme was acquired from the Podsafe Music Network. Prior to the November 2, 2005 show, the initial theme song was Thomas Dolby's "She Blinded Me with Science," which the hosts selected because "it seemed to fit."

== Guests ==
Many Skeptics' Guide episodes contain interviews. Often the interviews feature well-known scientists or skeptics, for instance Massimo Pigliucci or Joe Nickell. Rarely the guests are proponents of fringe or pseudoscientific views. Some episodes have guest rogues, such as Bill Nye, participating in the entire podcast. Notable guests include the following:

Show date	Episode	Guest	Description
Frequent guest	---	James Randi	A Canadian-American stage magician and scientific skeptic, founder of the James Randi Educational Foundation
Frequent guest	---	Phil Plait	An American astronomer and skeptic, former president of the James Randi Educational Foundation, known as "The Bad Astronomer"
Frequent guest	---	George Hrab	Musician, skeptic podcaster
Frequent guest	---	Richard Saunders	An Australian skeptic, podcaster and professional origamist
June 29, 2005	5	Michael Shermer	Founder of The Skeptics Society, author of Why People Believe Weird Things
September 7, 2005	12	Steve Milloy	Founder of junkscience.com
October 6, 2005	15	Chris Mooney	Author of The Republican War on Science
July 5, 2006	50	Gerald Posner	Author of Case Closed
July 12, 2006	51	Neal Adams	A proponent of the hollow and expanding earth hypotheses
October 4, 2006	63	Michael Shermer	Founder of The Skeptics Society, author of Why People Believe Weird Things
December 13, 2006	73	B. Alan Wallace	The president and founder of the Santa Barbara Institute for Consciousness Studies
January 31, 2007	80	Teller	One-half of the illusionist team Penn and Teller
February 7, 2007	81	Adam Savage and Tory Belleci	From the Discovery Channel show MythBusters
February 15, 2007	82	Christopher Hitchens	Journalist and literary critic, author of God is not Great: How Religion Poisons Everything
February 15, 2007	82	Matt Stone	Co-creator of South Park
February 21, 2007	83	Julia Sweeney	Former Saturday Night Live cast member
April 18, 2007	91	Susan Blackmore	PhD in parapsychology, skeptic, and author
July 25, 2007	105	Jimmy Carter	39th President of the United States, Nobel laureate
September 5, 2007	111	Bill Nye	"The Science Guy"
November 14, 2007	121	Paul Kurtz	Committee for Skeptical Inquiry founder and chairman of the Council for Secular Humanism
July 16, 2008	156	Neil deGrasse Tyson	An American astrophysicist and science communicator
August 26, 2008	162	Richard Saunders	An Australian skeptic, podcaster and professional origamist
October 8, 2008	168	PZ Myers	An American biology professor at the University of Minnesota Morris (UMM) and the author of the Pharyngula science blog
December 16, 2008	178	Richard Wiseman	A psychologist and professor of the public understanding of psychology at the University of Hertfordshire
January 15, 2009	182	Michio Kaku	Theoretical physicist
April 22, 2009	196	Seth Shostak	An American astronomer and senior Astronomer at the SETI Institute
May 13, 2009	199	Rusty Schweickart	An American Apollo astronaut
October 28, 2009	219	Mark Edward	Mentalist
March 25, 2010	245	George Hrab	Musician, skeptic podcaster
August 11, 2010	265	Rhys Morgan	Teenage consumer advocate
May 9, 2011	304	Jon Ronson	Author of The Psychopath Test
November 19, 2011	331	Neil deGrasse Tyson	An American astrophysicist and science communicator
December 3, 2011	333	Rhys Morgan	Teenage consumer advocate
September 8, 2012	373	Billy West	Voice actor on Futurama and other shows
September 29, 2012	376	Pamela Gay	Astronomer and podcaster
October 20, 2012	379	Jamy Ian Swiss	Close-up magician
November 17, 2012	383	Bruce Hood	Psychologist and author
December 1, 2012	385	Banachek	Mentalist and director of the JREF Million Dollar Challenge
January 5, 2013	390	Massimo Pigliucci	Philosopher and author
January 26, 2013	393	Zack Kopplin	Educational activist
March 2, 2013	398	Jon Ronson	Journalist and documentary film maker
May 11, 2013	408	Don McLeroy	Creationist and former member of the Texas State Board of Education
June 22, 2013	414	Daniel Loxton	Illustrator and editor of Junior Skeptic magazine
June 13, 2013	417	Paul Offit	Pediatrician and vaccine advocate
August 10, 2013	421	Michael E. Mann	Climatologist
August 24, 2013	423	Sanal Edamaruku	Author and founding president of Rationalist International
August 31, 2013	424	Cara Santa Maria	Science communicator
October 12, 2013	430	Marty Klein	Sex therapist and author
November 9, 2013	434	Chris Mooney and Indre Viskontas	Science writers and Podcasters
November 16, 2013	435	Gerald Posner	Journalist and author
December 7, 2013	438	Susan Gerbic & Tim Farley	Founder of Guerrilla Skepticism on Wikipedia & The creator of WhatsTheHarm.net
January 11, 2014	443	Mark Crislip	Medical doctor and podcaster
January 25, 2014	445	Karen Stollznow	Linguist and podcaster
March 1, 2014	451	Michio Kaku	Physicist and science communicator
March 15, 2014	453	Jennifer Ouellette	Science writer
April 5, 2014	456	James Marsters	Actor and musician
May 3, 2014	460	Elise Andrew	Founder and maintainer of the "I Fucking Love Science" Facebook page
September 27, 2014	481	Daniel Dennett	Philosopher and cognitive scientist
July 21, 2018	680	Bill Nye	"The Science Guy"
December 15, 2018	701	Susan Gerbic	Founder of Guerrilla Skepticism on Wikipedia discussing that project
March 9, 2019	713	Susan Gerbic	Founder of Guerrilla Skepticism on Wikipedia discussing New York Times coverage of psychic sting operation on Thomas John

== Recognition ==
The Skeptics' Guide won the 2009 Podcast Awards in the "Education" category, and the 2010, 2011, 2012, and 2014 Podcast Awards in the "Science" category.

It was also a 2014 "Dose of Rationality" Top 10 Podcast, and a 2010 Physics.org Best Podcast nominee.

== Sponsors and membership ==
On July 30, 2013, Steven Novella announced that the SGU would begin offering membership and airing sponsors. Novella went on to say that the money raised would go into funding skeptical activities, including but not limited to, development of skeptical educational content and web-series such as "Occ The Skeptical Caveman". The addition of sponsors is not permanent, according to Novella, they shall be removed "if 4% of listeners support the SGU through membership at an average of the $8 per month level." Though membership has begun, the SGU continues to publish a free weekly sponsored podcast. Membership entitles one to an ad-free version of The SGU, extra content, and discounts to NECSS (The Northeast Conference on Science and Skepticism). Membership range from $4/month to $200/month.

Additional financial support from listeners is provided through Patreon. The SGU has established several goals after achieving a certain number of financial supporters. A major benchmark was reached in 2018 with 3,000 Patreon supporters that sustained enough predictable income for a full-time employee. Other benchmarks include a 12-hour and 24-hour live show after reaching 4,000 and 5,500 supporters, respectively. These live shows may be located on the most complete and accurate reproduction of the Starship Enterprise Star Trek: The Original Series set, which was built by James Cawley and can be seen on the SGU Patreon page introduction video.

As of early 2026, the show is supported by over 7,700 members. This funding has facilitated large-scale projects, including studio upgrades and live touring events such as the "SGU Extravaganza."

== Books ==
=== The Skeptics' Guide to the Universe (2018) ===
The Skeptics' Guide to the Universe: How to Know What's Really Real in a World Increasingly Full of Fake is a 2018 book written by Steven Novella and co-authored by the other current co-hosts of The Skeptics' Guide to the Universe podcast—Bob Novella, Cara Santa Maria, Jay Novella, and Evan Bernstein. It also contains posthumous material from former co-host Perry DeAngelis. The book is meant to be an all-encompassing guide to skeptical thinking. In an interview with The European Skeptics Podcast, Jay Novella describes their approach to writing the book from the "point of view of an alien species observing the earth from a skeptical perspective using critical thinking," reminiscent of the podcast's namesake The Hitchhiker's Guide to the Galaxy by Douglas Adams.

=== The Skeptics' Guide to the Future (2022) ===
In September 2022, the hosts published their second book, The Skeptics' Guide to the Future: What Yesterday's Science and Science Fiction Tell Us About the World of Tomorrow. The book examines historical predictions of the future that failed, explores the reasons why futurism is often inaccurate, and speculates on potential technologies such as genetic manipulation and quantum computing.

It received a starred review from Publishers Weekly, which described it as "pop science done right" and an "antidote to spreading anti-scientific sentiments." Barnes & Noble named it one of the "Best Science Books of 2022."
