= Orak Island =

Orak Island (Turkish: Orak Adası) may refer to one the three Turkish islands in the Aegean Sea

- Orak Island (Çanakkale), Turkey
- Orak Island (İzmir), Turkey
- Orak Island (Muğla), Turkey
