= Orak =

Orak may refer to:

- A fictional computer in Rogue Planet, a Dan Dare story
- An islet in Kayangel atoll, Palau
- Orak Island (Çanakkale), Turkey
- Orak Island (İzmir), Turkey
- Orak Island (Muğla), Turkey

== See also ==
- Orac (disambiguation)
