= Rachael Dunlop =

Australian sceptic

Rachael Anne Dunlop
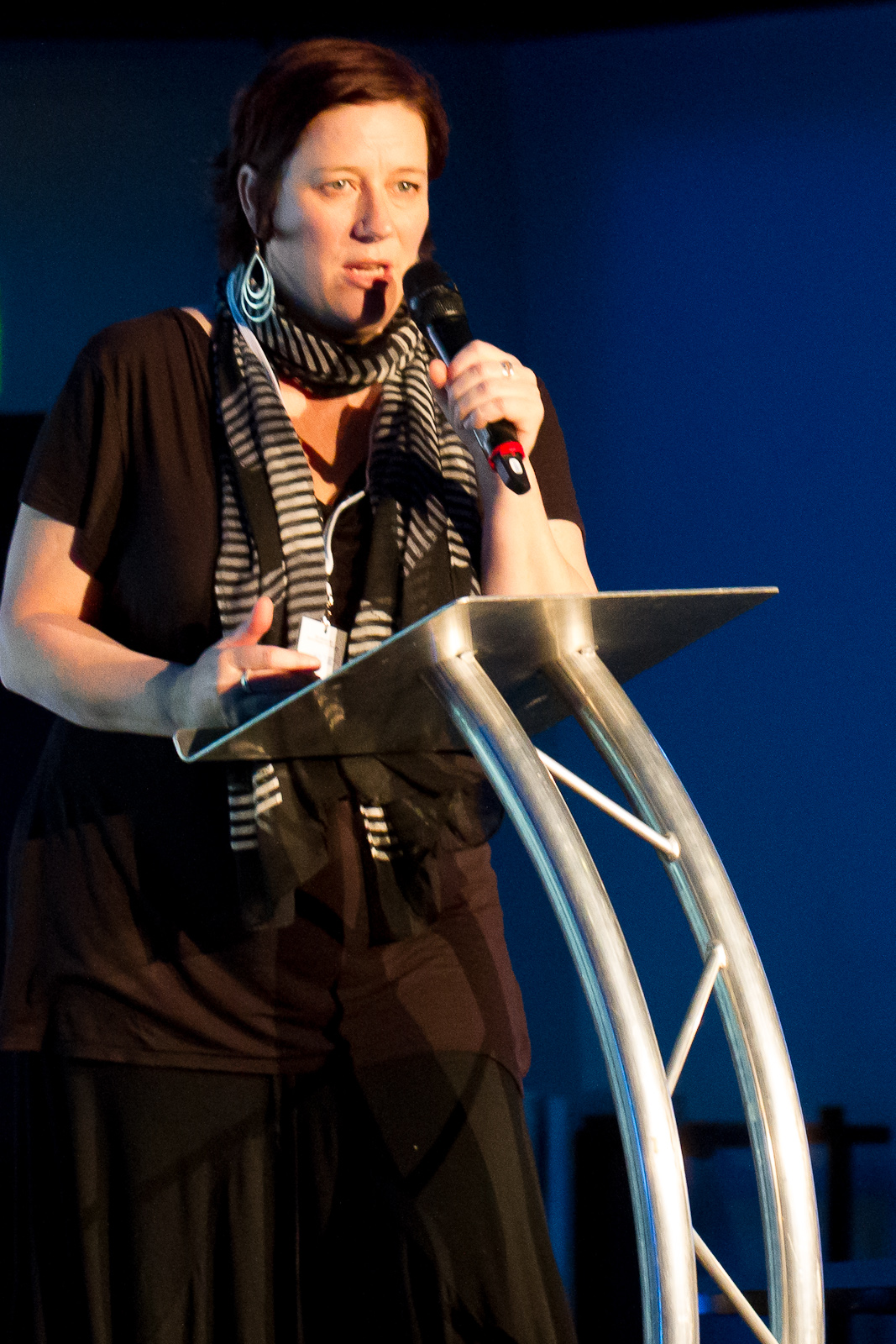
- Rachael Dunlop at QED 2013 in Manchester, UK
- Born: 19 November 1970 (age 55); Sydney, Australia
- Education: University of Adelaide, Sydney Medical School
- Known for: Scientific skepticism
- Awards: Shorty Awards
- Scientific career
- Fields: Heart disease, motor neurone disease
- Workplaces: University of Technology Sydney
- Thesis: Investigation into the mechanisms of intracellular degradation of proteins containing oxidised amino acids (2005)
- Rachael Dunlop Voice recorded in February 2014
- Website: www.scepticsbook.com

Rachael Anne Dunlop (born 19 November 1970), popularly known as Dr. Rachie, is an Australian medical researcher and skeptic. She is a postdoctoral fellow in cell biology at the University of Technology Sydney.

A prominent member of the Australian skeptic movement, she frequently blogs about and speaks out against the anti-vaccine movement in Australia and has a regular segment on The Skeptic Zone podcast. Dunlop won a Shorty Award in 2010 for her Twitter posts about health-related topics.

Dunlop has been interviewed about skepticism, vaccines, and her research on several national radio and television programs, including Big Ideas, The Project, and Lateline.

== Education and career ==
In high school Dunlop studied both art and science, and after graduation got a certificate in fine art from Stanley Street School of Art (majoring in photography and print making), followed by an Advanced Diploma in Graphic Design from the Croydon Park campus of TAFE South Australia. She also completed AWARD (Australasian Writers and Art Directors) School.

She has worked as a photographer and printmaker, a graphic designer, and a copywriter for a large international advertising agency.

Dunlop eventually lost interest in her advertising work and went on to earn a bachelor's degree in cell biology at the University of Adelaide, even though she hadn't taken any biology in high school. She then received an honours degree from the Department of Experimental Pharmacology and Toxicology at Adelaide University and a PhD in cell biology from Sydney Medical School in 2005. Her PhD dissertation examined the mechanisms of impaired degradation of oxidised proteins with a focus on the consequences for heart disease.

She worked as a medical researcher at the Heart Research Institute in Camperdown, New South Wales, and is currently a postdoctoral fellow at the University of Technology Sydney, where she studies ageing disorders and motor neurone disease. She is also on the editorial board for the peer-reviewed journal Focus on Alternative and Complementary Therapies.

In 2013 Dunlop received media attention for publishing a study that demonstrated a link between exposure to cyanobacteria and motor neurone disease, also known as amyotrophic lateral sclerosis (ALS) or Lou Gehrig's disease. She and her colleagues found that the bacteria (commonly known as blue-green algae) produce an amino acid called BMAA that causes cell death and triggers the onset of the fatal disease. The cyanobacteria can be ingested by drinking contaminated water and may even occur on fruits and vegetables washed in this water. Additionally, BMAA may be responsible for the extremely high prevalence of the disease among the indigenous people of Guam, who eat fruit bats that have ingested the seeds of plants growing amongst the cyanobacteria. She suggests that the use of cyanobacteria in fertiliser production may even be linked to a higher incidence of motor neurone disease among certain athletes. Other researchers have begun clinical trials of potential treatments based on this research.

== Skepticism ==
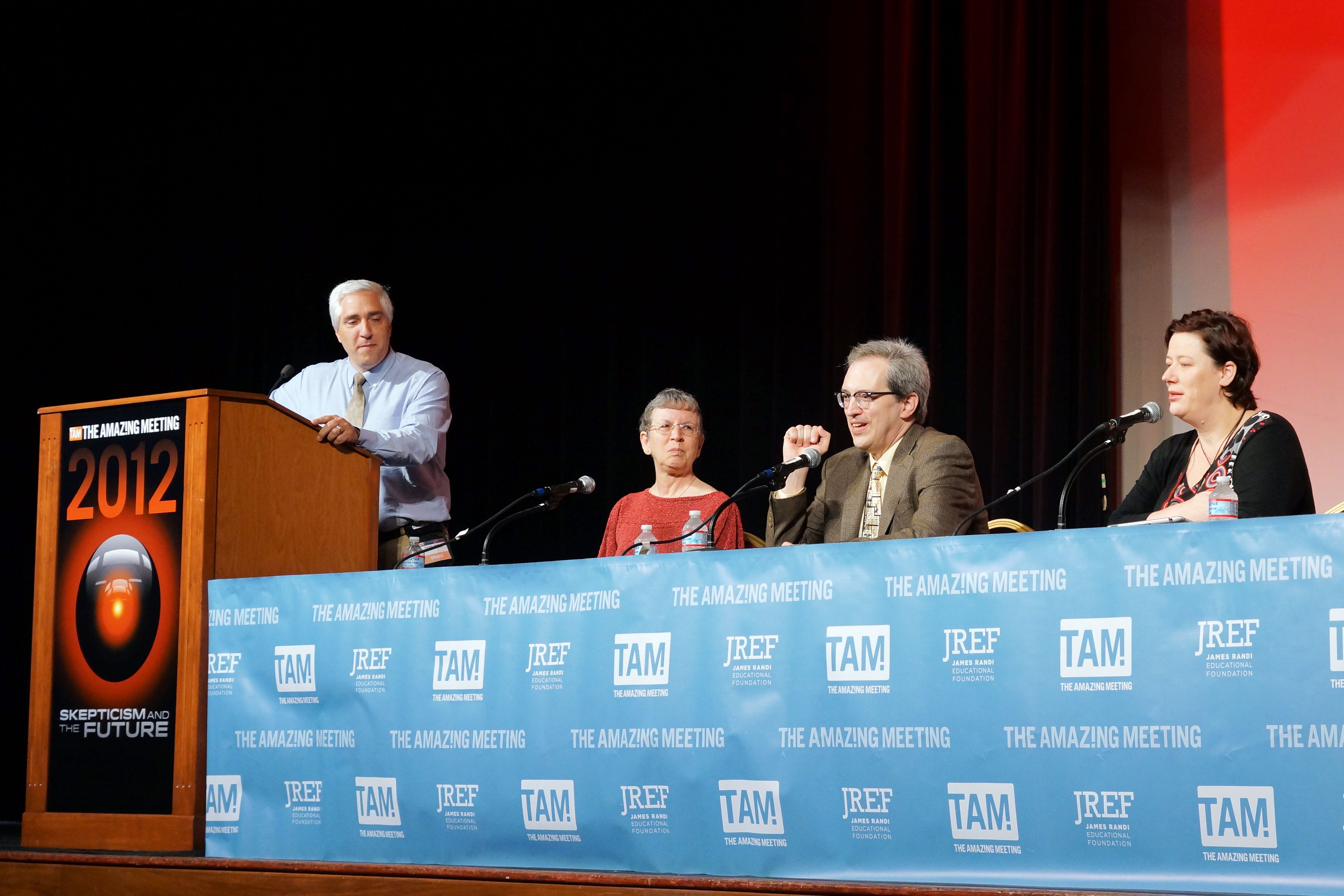
Steven Novella, Harriet Hall, David Gorski, and Rachael Dunlop (right) on a panel at The Amaz!ng Meeting 2012

Rachael Dunlop became involved in the scientific skepticism movement in 2008 after meeting Australian Skeptics president Richard Saunders at a Skeptics in the Pub event. She is currently the vice-president of the New South Wales committee of the Australian Skeptics, and she has a regular segment called "Dr. Rachie Reports" on the organisation's podcast, The Skeptic Zone, where she dissects the claims of alternative medicine practitioners. She also co-organizes the Sydney Skeptics Meetup group and helped organise The Amaz!ng Meeting Australia.

In 2008 Dunlop joined The Mystery Investigators, headed by Australian Skeptics president Richard Saunders. The program teaches students to use science and critical thinking to investigate claims of the paranormal, such as water divining, spoon bending, and firewalking.

Much of Dunlop's advocacy as a skeptic is focused on countering the claims of the anti-vaccination movement, specifically the Australian Vaccination Network (AVN) and its former president Meryl Dorey. In 2010 the AVN was ordered by the Health Care Complaints Commission to post a prominent warning on their website, but the organisation refused to comply and appealed the decision. In response, Dunlop and other skeptics organised a "Google bomb" so that Web searches for the name of the organisation resulted in several links to critical websites on the first page of results. In 2009 the Australian Skeptics presented Dorey and the AVN with their Bent Spoon Award, which is "presented to the perpetrator of the most preposterous piece of paranormal or pseudoscientific piffle". Dorey quickly responded with a media release sarcastically "accepting" the award.

After the highly publicised 2009 death of four-week-old Dana McCaffery from whooping cough—a vaccine-preventable disease—AVN's Dorey claimed in a televised interview that the girl's death was unrelated to the disease. This inspired Dunlop and other skeptics to create a "Stop the AVN" Facebook group to advocate against the Australian anti-vaccination movement.

Dunlop has a blog, The Sceptics' Book of Pooh-Pooh, where she writes about the Australian anti-vaccination movement and other science- and health-related topics. She has also contributed articles to the Science-Based Medicine blog about the Australian Vaccination Network, among other topics. She occasionally writes articles on alternative medicine for The Conversation. She was invited to speak on two panels at The Amaz!ng Meeting 2012: "The Truth About Alternative Medicine" and "Dr. Google."

Dunlop argued in an editorial in The Guardian that media reporting of vaccine-related topics gives too much weight to voices from the anti-vaccine movement since they represent an insignificant minority compared to doctors and scientists who recommend vaccination.

Dunlop won a 2010 Shorty Award in the Health category for her Twitter posts on medical issues.

== Media ==
On 9 March 2010, Dunlop was interviewed by Richard Fidler on the ABC Local Radio program "Conversations." She discussed her work on cyanobacteria and motor neurone disease, her pro-vaccination advocacy, and her activities with Australian Skeptics.

On 28 April 2011, she was featured on the ABC Radio National program Big Ideas for a talk she gave at the Festival of Commercial Creativity. In the talk she discussed the dangers of using the Google search engine to self-diagnose medical conditions as well as her efforts to Google bomb the Australian Vaccination Network.

The Network Ten television program The Project featured an interview with Dunlop in a segment about conspiracy theories on 23 January 2012.

The Special Broadcasting Service and The Conversation website produced a video in May 2013 in which Dunlop dispels six "vaccination myths."

In November 2013, the Australian Vaccination Network was ordered by the New South Wales Administrative Decisions Tribunal to change their name so that consumers are aware of the anti-vaccination nature of the group. Dunlop was interviewed shortly afterwards on the Australian TV show Lateline, where she praised the Tribunal's decision. According to Lateline, former AVN president "Meryl Dorey claimed she was a victim of hate groups and vested interests" in response to the ruling.
