= ORAC =

ORAC or Orac may refer to:

- Oxygen radical absorbance capacity, a scalar value derived in the laboratory for comparing the antioxidant content of different foods or nutritional supplements
- Office of the Registrar of Aboriginal Corporations, former name of the Australian government agency now called Office of the Registrar of Indigenous Corporations (ORIC)
- Orac (Blake's 7), a computer in the science fiction television series Blake's 7
- Orac (MD program), a classical molecular dynamics program for solvated biomolecules
- Orac, Leova, a commune in Moldova
- Orac, an early poker-playing computer program developed by Mike Caro
- ORAC, Wilhelm Reich's abbreviation for his orgone accumulator

People

- Orac, pseudonym of David Gorski, cancer surgeon and blogger critical of alternative medicine
- Costel Orac (born 1959), Romanian footballer
- Daniel Orac (born 1985), Romanian footballer

== See also ==
- Orak (disambiguation)
