= The Amazing Meeting =

Annual conference for skeptics, 2003–2015

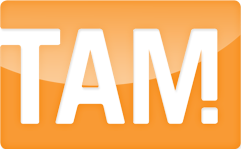
- Status: Inactive
- Genre: Science and skepticism
- Locations: Las Vegas, Nevada, U.S.
- Country: United States
- Inaugurated: 2003
- Most recent: 2015
- Attendance: 1,650 in 2011
- Organizer: James Randi Educational Foundation
- Website: AmazingMeeting.com

The Amazing Meeting (TAM), stylized as The Amaz!ng Meeting, was an annual conference that focused on science, skepticism, and critical thinking; it was held for twelve years. The conference started in 2003 and was sponsored by the James Randi Educational Foundation (JREF). Perennial speakers included Penn & Teller, Phil Plait, Michael Shermer and James "The Amazing" Randi. Speakers at the four-day conference were selected from a variety of disciplines including scientific educators, magicians, and community activists. Outside the plenary sessions the conference included workshops, additional panel discussions, music and magic performances and live taping of podcasts including The Skeptics' Guide to the Universe. The final Amazing Meeting was held in July 2015.

== History and organization ==
TAM was first held in 2003, attracting around 150 attendees. When the CSICOP conferences entered a seven-year hiatus in 2005, TAM quickly filled the gap and, with more than 1,000 attendees, developed to become the largest U.S. skeptical conference.

The Skeptics Society and the Committee for Skeptical Inquiry were co-sponsors of the event, providing both financial and promotional support.

People attended the conference for a variety of reasons. The Daily Beast reported that some saw themselves "as waging a broad, multifront battle to drag American culture, inch by inch, away from the nonscientific and the nonlogical". While the organizer of TAM London, Tracy King, said "People come to TAM because they want to learn and hear from leading speakers on subjects which interest them, but they want to have a good time doing it. Our mix of academics, comedians and writers ensures an incredible event where the public can meet like-minded people without feeling like being into science or geek stuff makes them a minority." Magicians were also given a central role at the conference.

The magazine The Skeptic from the Australian Skeptics gave a detailed account of all lectures from the 2010 OZ event.

Randi retired from active participation in the JREF in early 2015; a final TAM was organized in his honour in July 2015. After this, the Committee for Skeptical Inquiry chose Las Vegas as the location for CSICon 2016 to fill the void.

At The Amazing Meeting in 2011 (TAM 9) the Independent Investigations Group (IIG) organised a tribute to James Randi. The group gathered together with other attendees, put on fake white beards, and posed for a large group photo with Randi. At the CSICon in 2017, in absence of Randi, the IIG organised another group photo with leftover beards from the 2011 photo. After Randi was sent the photo, he replied, "I'm always very touched by any such expression. This is certainly no exception. You have my sincere gratitude. I suspect, however that a couple of those beards were fake. But I'm in a forgiving mood at the moment. I'm frankly very touched. I'll see you at the next CSICon. Thank you all."

== Paranormal Challenge ==
Beginning in 2009, the Amazing Meeting also hosted a public test of The One Million Dollar Paranormal Challenge for the performance of any paranormal, occult or supernatural event, under proper observing conditions. At The Amazing Meeting 7, it was announced that the $1 Million Challenge prize would not expire in 2010 as previously announced.

Claimant Connie Sonne in 2009 failed to find target cards in sealed envelopes using a dowsing pendulum. Mentalist Mark Edward was the only person to interview her after her test; he wrote that the room was rapt in close attention, "It was an amazing testament to just how single-minded a conference room full of skeptical non-believers could be. I dare say that even a few of the thousand assembled might have been in some way mentally rooting for Connie to win or score some significant record for her trouble. She didn't." She stated to Edward that it was not time for her "powers to be revealed" and blamed no-one for her failures, only citing that she was involved in future world-changing events.

In 2013 a man from Algeria was the Million Dollar challenger. He claimed to be able to remote view objects that were held in a sealed room. He was unable to see the objects and thus failed the challenge.

Applicant Fei Wang appeared before the skeptic audience July 2014 with the claim that he could send energy through his hand using a type of therapeutic touch. The organizers set up a double blind test involving a volunteer selected by Wang to place their hand in a box while wearing noise canceling headphones and a blindfold. Wang or the control person (Jamy Ian Swiss) depending on the roll of a die would insert their hand also in the box (not touching the volunteer) for several seconds. Swiss was selected to be the control because Wang felt that Swiss does not have the ability that is being tested. After either Wang or the Control (Swiss) had placed their hand in the box, the volunteer would state which energy was felt. Wang had to get 8 out of 9 correct in order to pass to the final Million Dollar challenge. After the volunteer was unable to feel the energy that Wang said he was sending through his hand on the first two tries, the test was concluded as it was no longer possible for Wang to win the challenge even if he was chosen correct on the remaining tries.

Tech journalist Lee Hutchinson approached the JREF after writing an article for Ars Technica about directional Ethernet cables that claim to "keep your audio signal completely free of electromagnetic interference". The MDC set up a controlled double-blind demonstration with volunteers listening to two identical recordings with a randomly selected Ethernet cable, a normal one or the cable claiming to improve the listening experience. After six volunteers, the demonstration was called off, as they were unable to select the "enhanced" cable over the common cable.

The tests included:

Year	Challenger	Ability	Test	Results	Notes
2009	Connie Sonne	Dowsing (pendulum)	Identify playing cards in sealed envelope	Failed	
2010	Anita Ikonen	Medical dowsing	Determine by observation which of five subjects was missing a kidney	Failed	Billed as "demonstration" not "test"
2011	No challenger available				
2012	Andrew Needles	Performance-enhancing bracelet	Distinguish participants wearing real product significant number of times	Failed	Claimant abandoned test in progress
2013	Brahim Addoun	Remote viewing	Remotely identify 3 of 20 objects	Failed	
2014	Fei Wang	Can send energy through his hand that can be felt by another person	Electricity to the hand felt correctly eight out of nine times	Failed	
2015	No claimant - "Demonstration test"	Ethernet cables that are claimed to be "directional"	Volunteers were played sound twice and were asked to determine which cable had the highest sound quality	Failed	

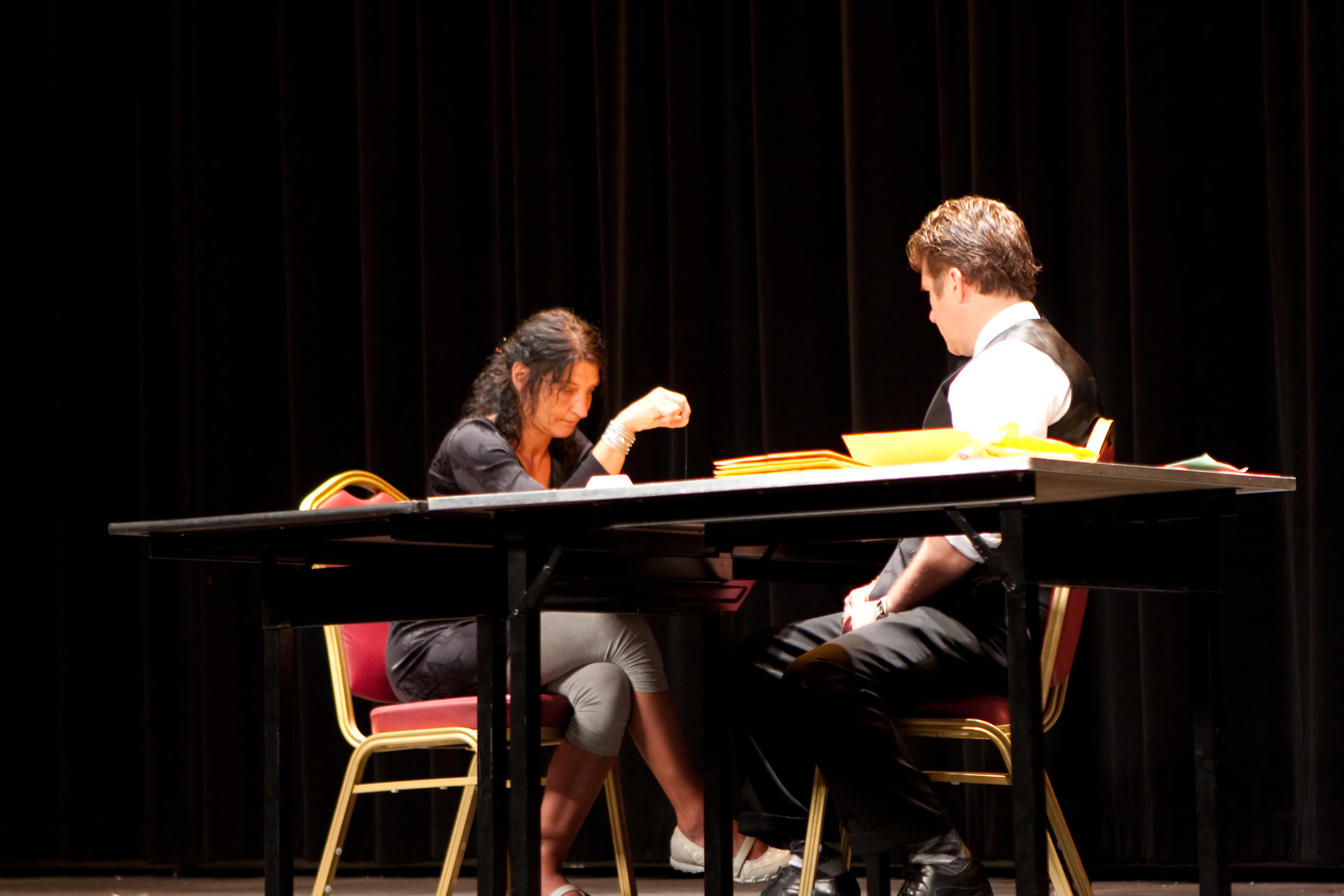
Connie Sonne & Banachek at TAM 2009

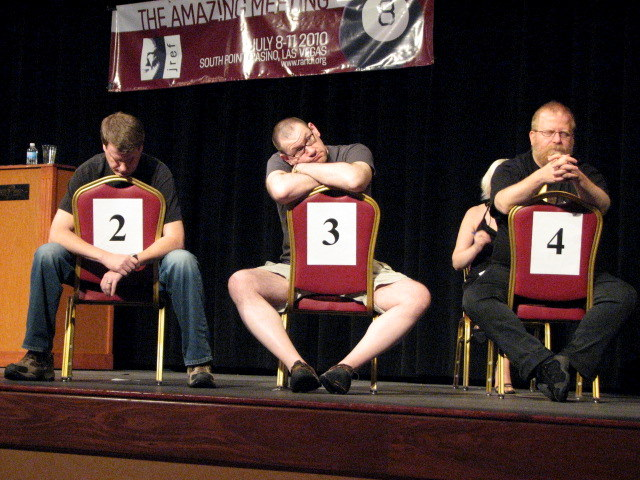
Hal Bidlack, Derek Colanduno and others are "viewed" by paranormal applicant for a missing kidney.

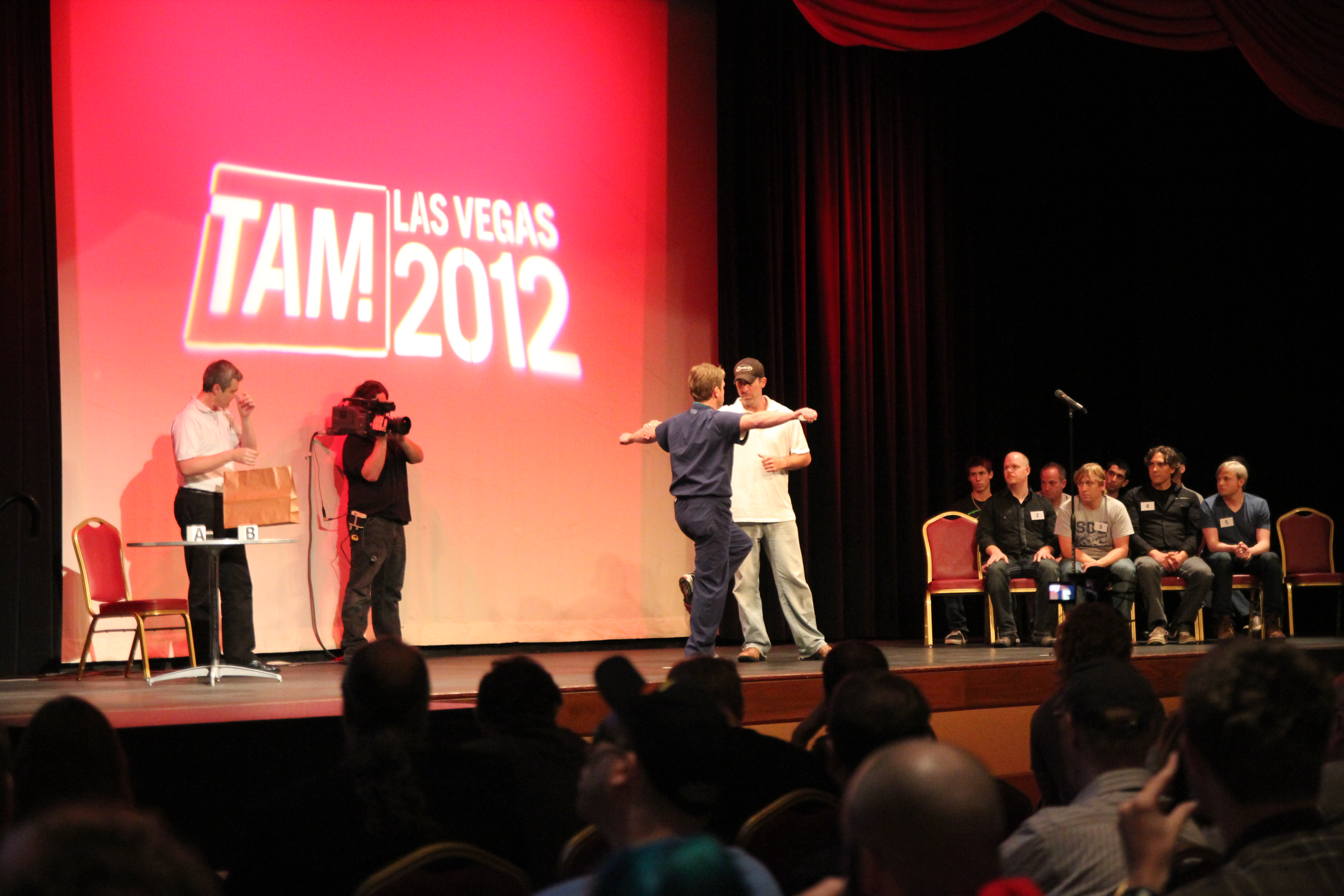
Performance-enhancing bracelet at TAM 2012

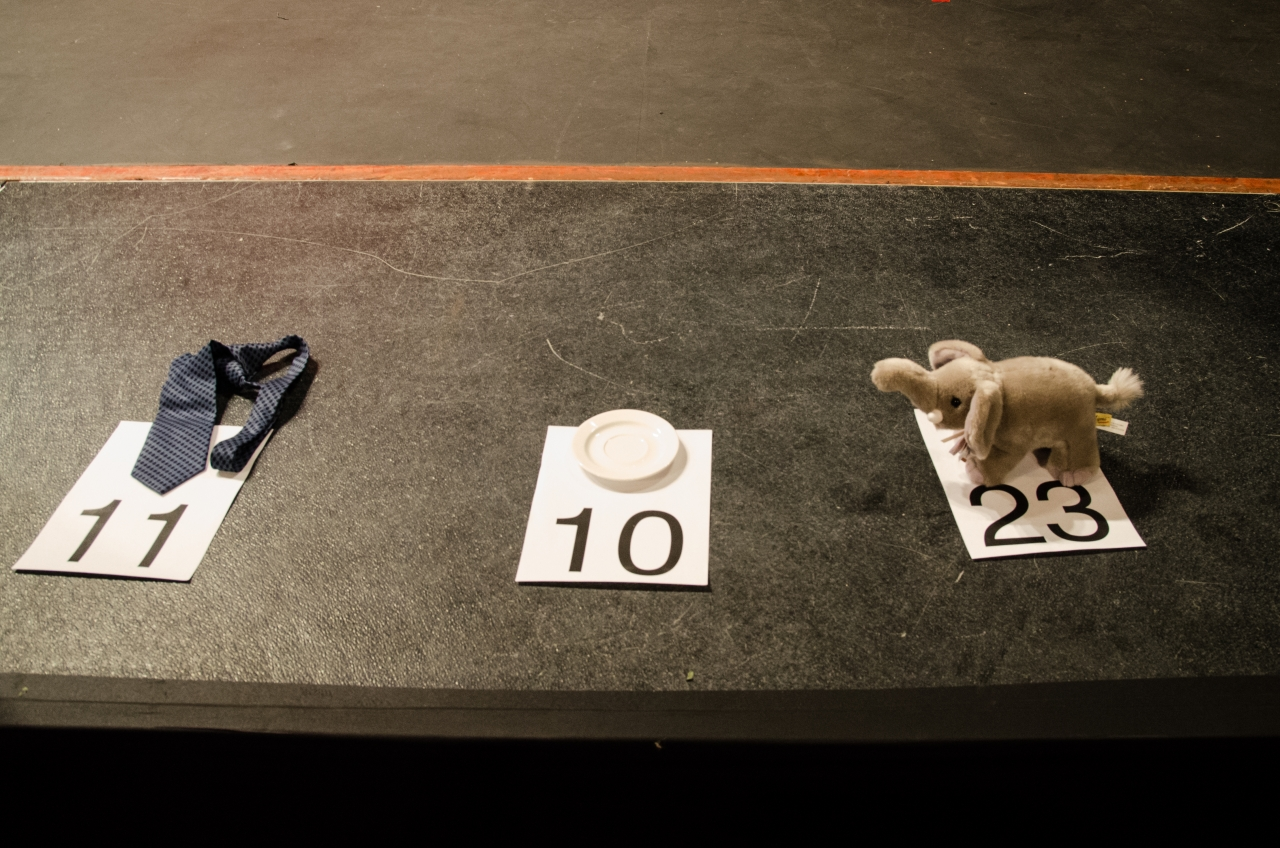
The 3 remote viewing objects from TAM 2013

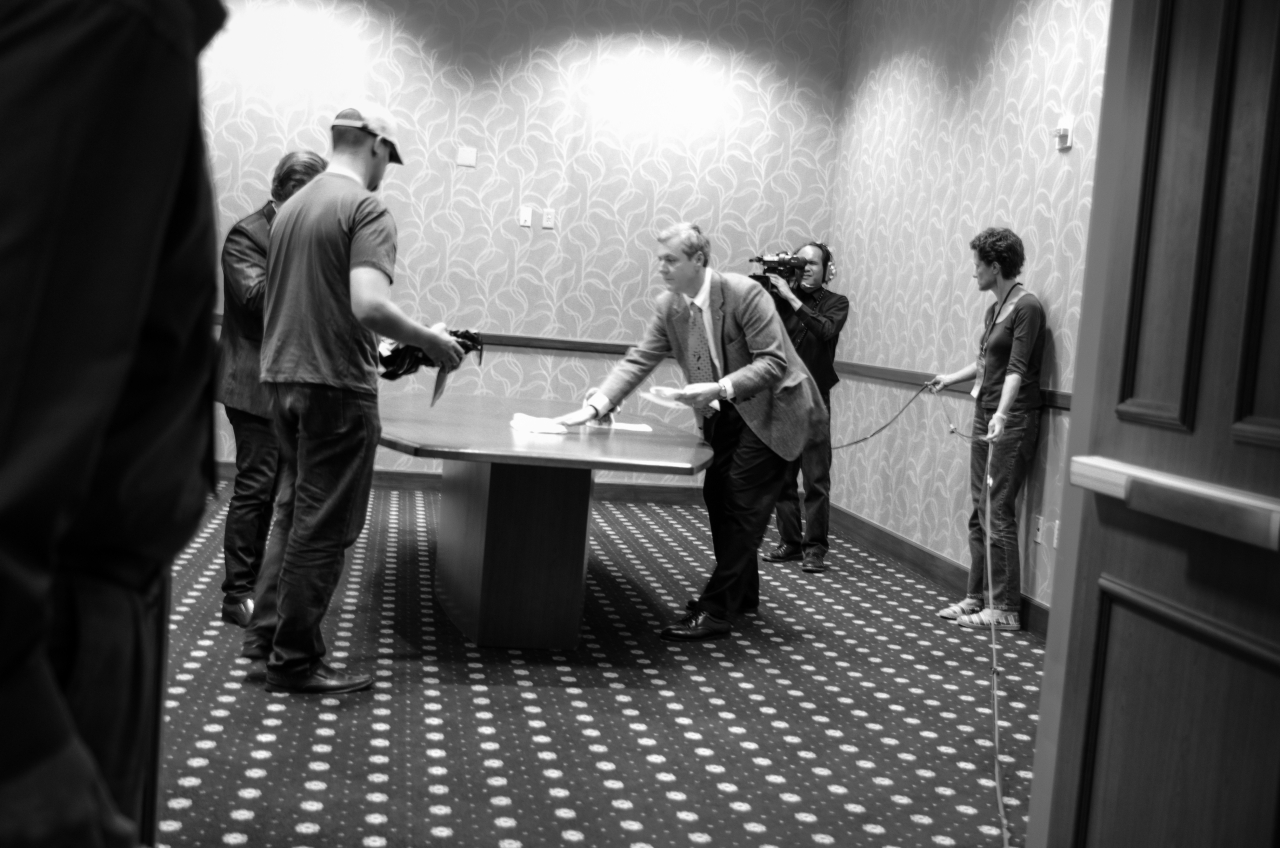
Richard Saunders in remote viewing room at TAM 2013

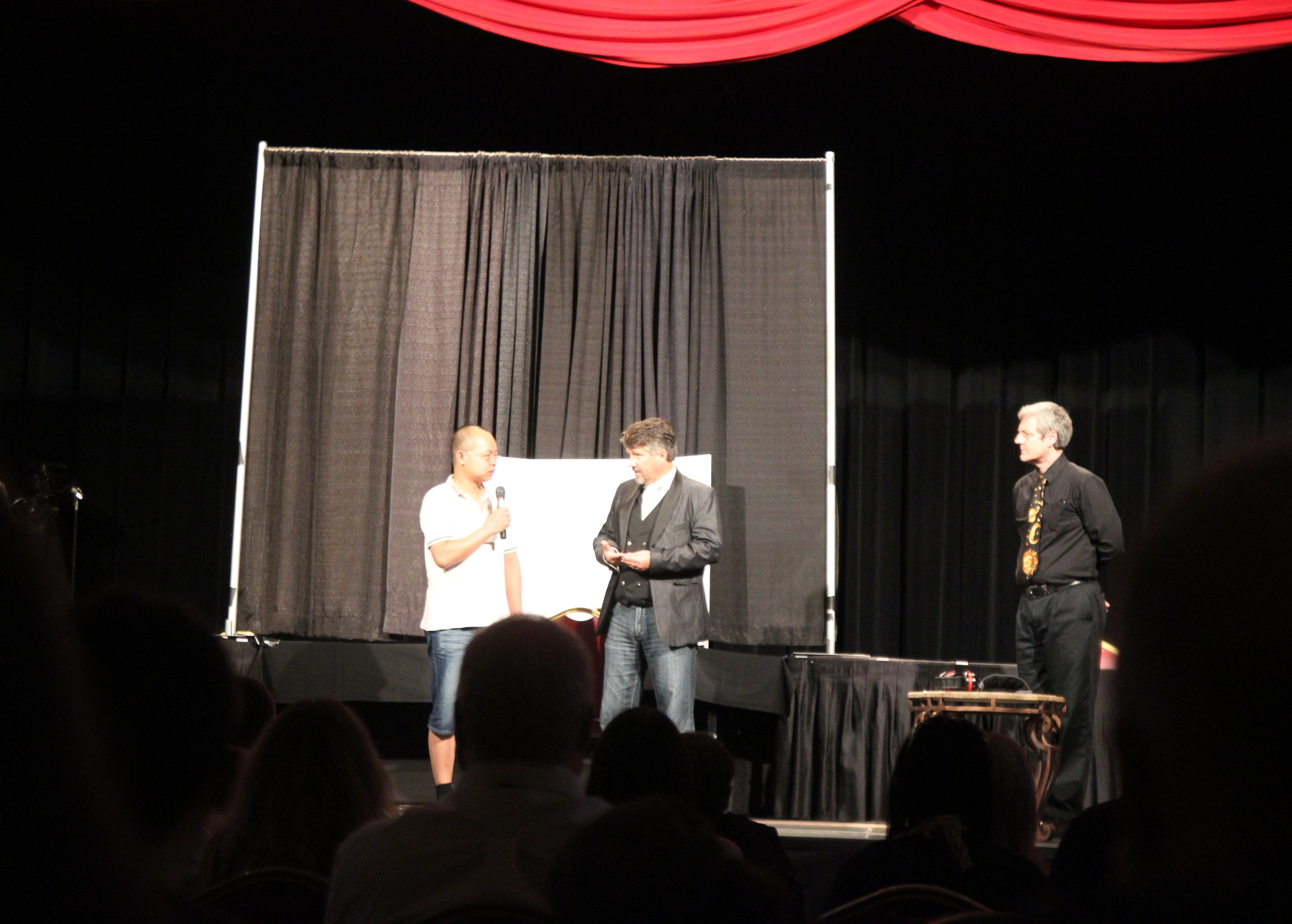
Fei Wang is applicant, Banachek and Richard Saunders are assisting TAM 2014

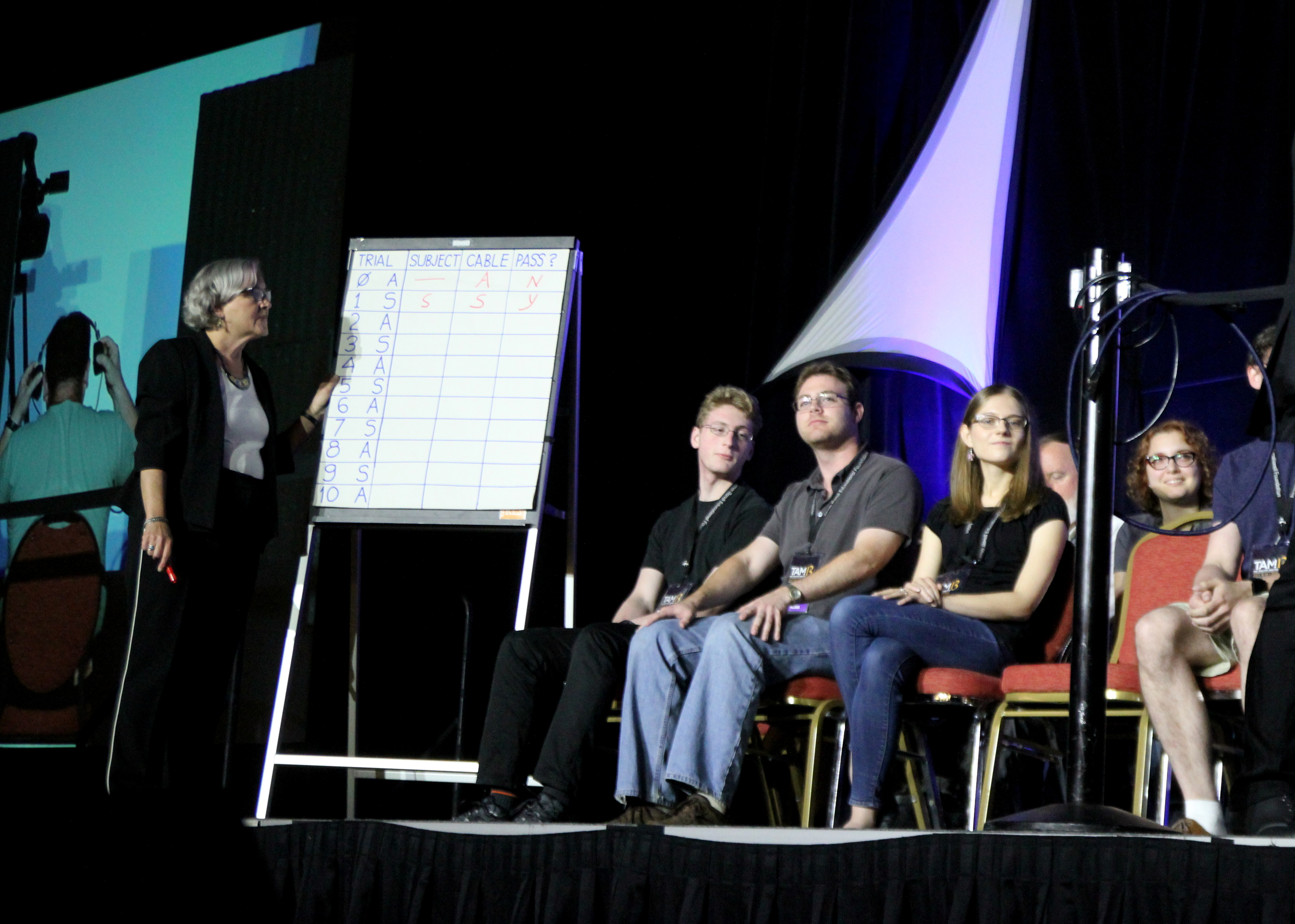
Demonstration test of Ethernet cables TAM13 - Grace Denman and volunteers - 2015

== Special awards ==
The James Randi Education Foundation presented special awards at the Amazing Meeting to people who they label champions of skepticism. Robert S. Lancaster received the 2009 Citizen Skeptic award for his work on the website Stop Sylvia which critically examines the claims of self-proclaimed psychic Sylvia Browne.

At that year's TAM London the award for Outstanding Contribution to Skepticism went to Simon Singh in recognition for his successful appeal against a libel charge by the British Chiropractic Association.

In 2010 at TAM London then 15-year-old Rhys Morgan received a special grassroots skepticism award from Randi.

Reed Esau received the James Randi Award for Skepticism in the Public Interest at TAM 2012 for his work inventing SkeptiCamp.

At TAM 2013, the award winner was Susan Gerbic for her work with crowd-sourced activism, specifically her work as the leader of the Guerrilla Skepticism on Wikipedia (GSoW) project.

The award reads:

With gratitude for your steadfast advocacy for skepticism on the World Wide Web and at the grass roots

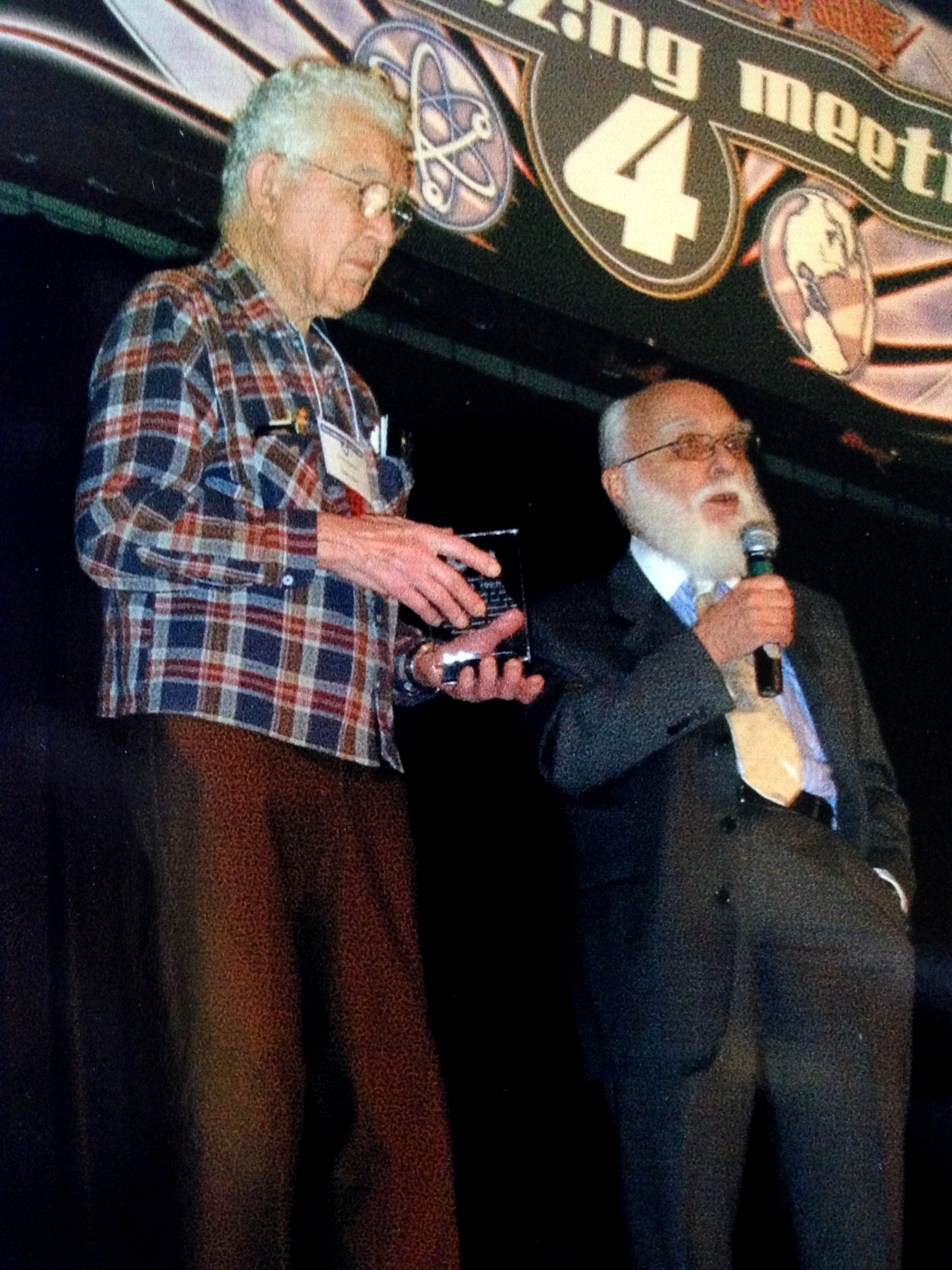
Magician Jerry Andrus and James Randi TAM4 2006

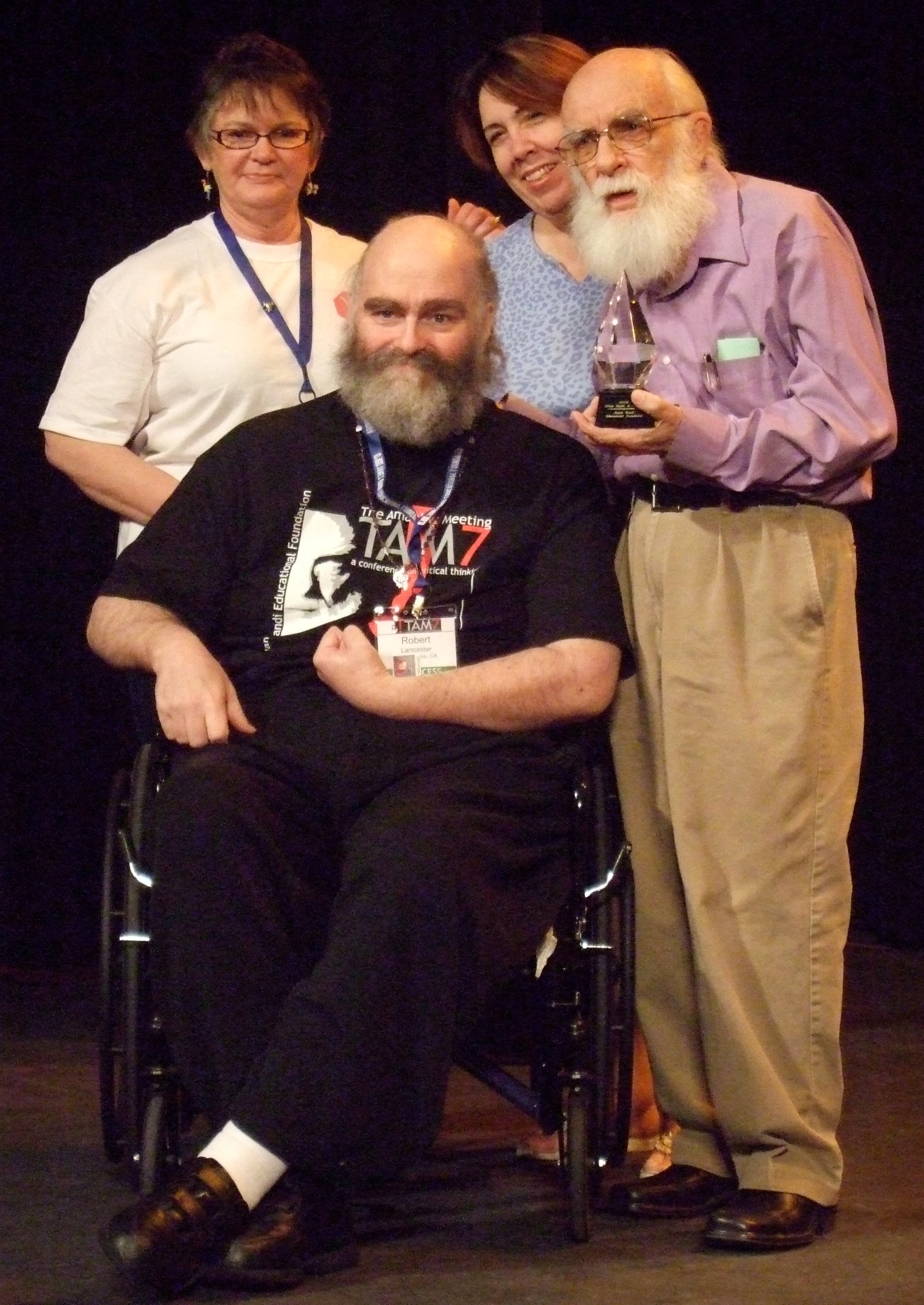
Robert S. Lancaster with family and James Randi receiving the Citizen Skeptic Award, July 11, 2009

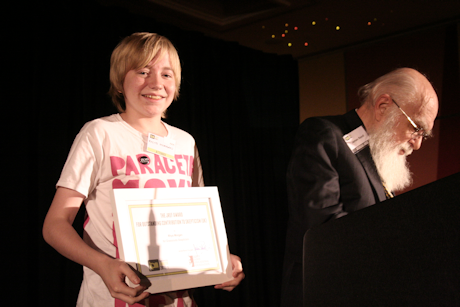
Rhys Morgan receiving the James Randi Award for Grassroots Activism TAM London, October 16, 2010

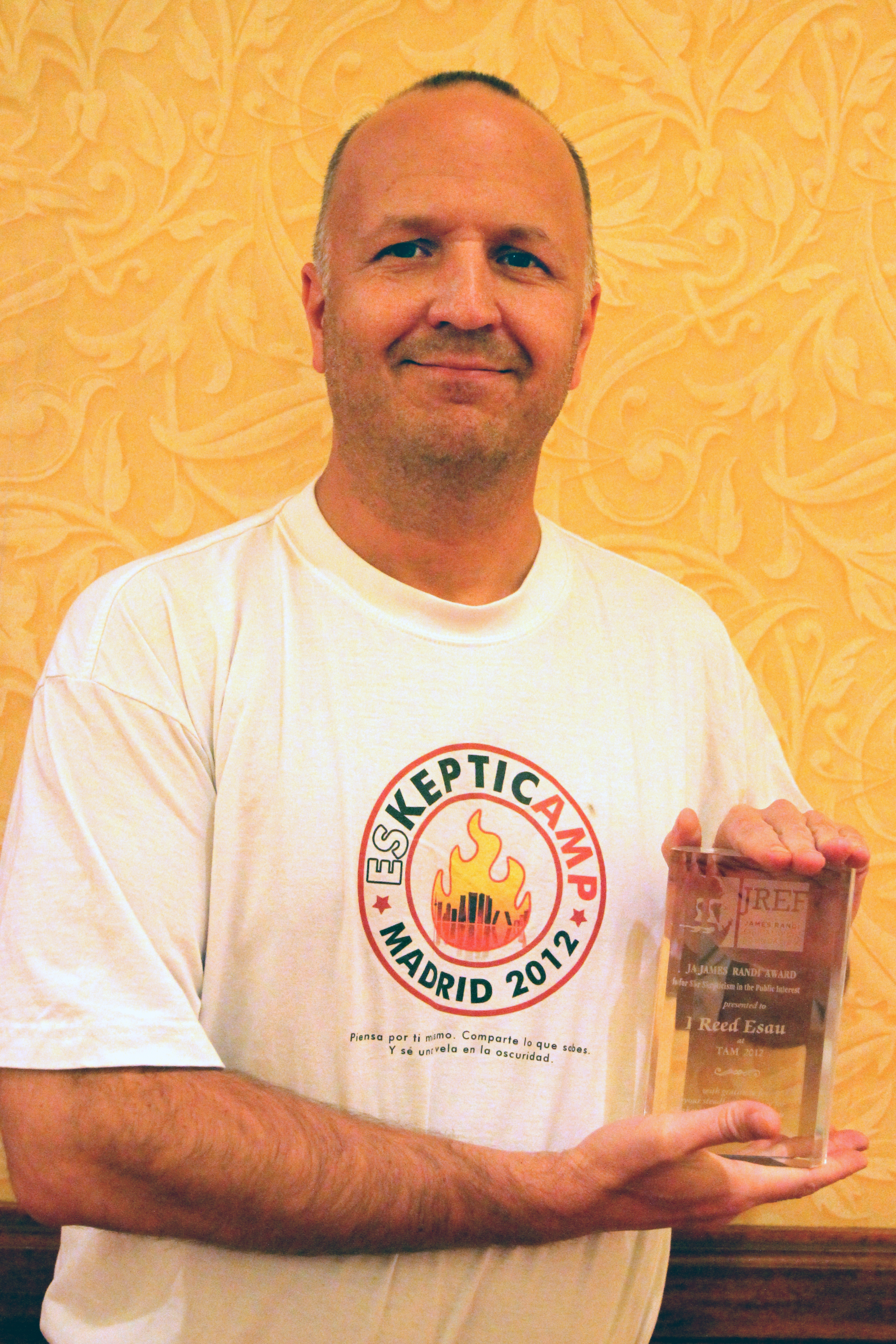
Reed Esau, Founder of SkeptiCamp, receiving James Randi Award for Skepticism in the Public Interest, at TAM 2012

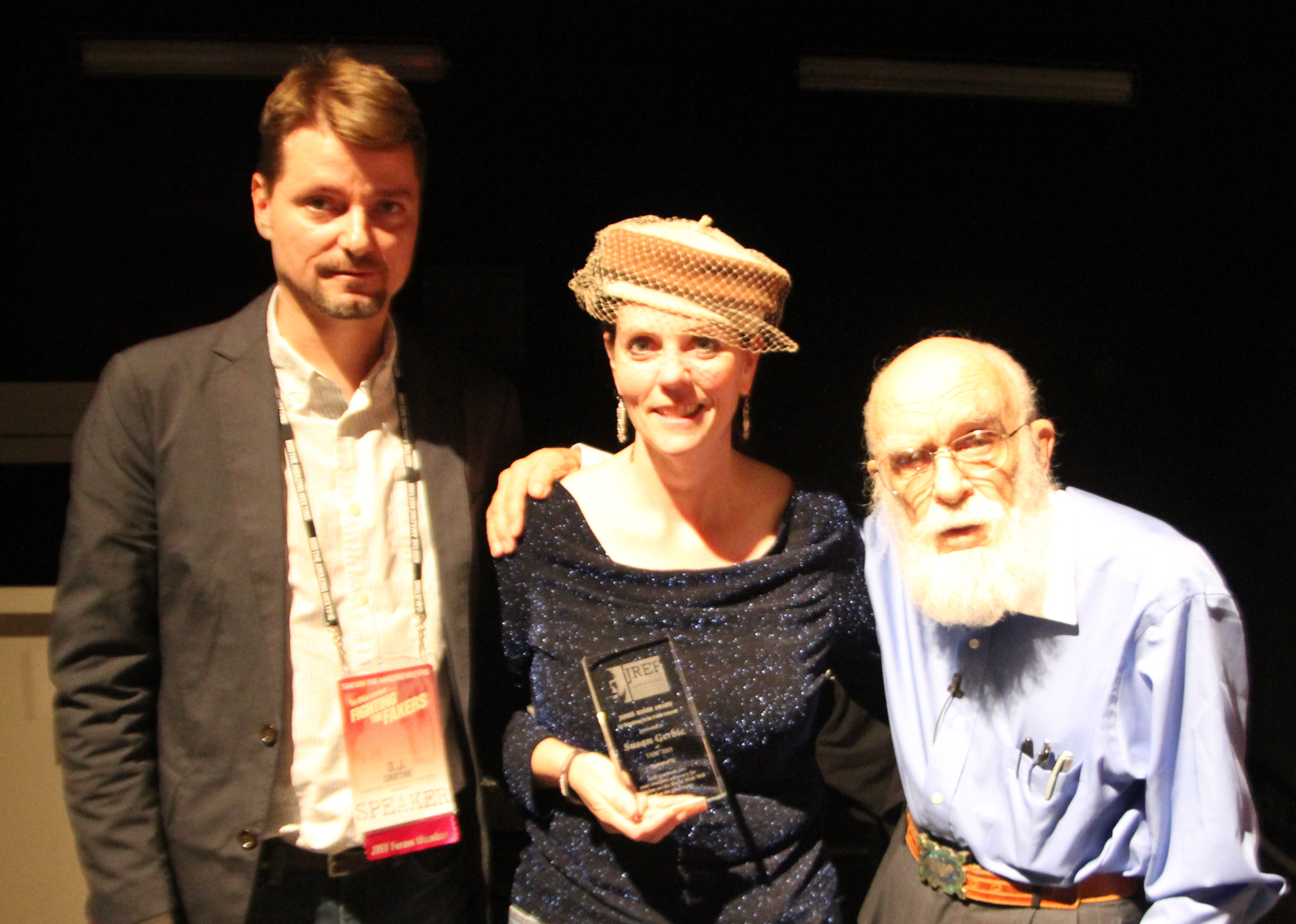
D.J. Grothe, Susan Gerbic, James Randi - Gerbic is presented with the James Randi award for Skepticism in the Public Interest

== Locations and dates ==
In addition to the Las Vegas-based conferences the JREF also sponsored international TAM conferences, with the first TAM London taking place in 2009 and TAM Australia in 2010, co-sponsored by Australian Skeptics, in 2010. A related series of events titled The Amazing Adventure has been held featuring trips to the Bermuda Triangle (2007), an Alaskan cruise (2007), the Galapagos Islands (2008), Mexico (2009), and the Caribbean (2010).

Dates	Location	Name	Speakers	Attendance and notes
January 31 - February 2, 2003	Fort Lauderdale, FL	The Amaz!ing Meeting	James Randi, Jose Alvarez, Jerry Andrus, Marvin Minsky, John Brown, Hal Bidlack, Jack Horkheimer, Phil Plait, James Underdown, Eric Krieg, Alan Koslow, Lisa Goodlin, Andrew Mayne, Dan Garvin, Jack LaTona, Chip Denman, Jamy Ian Swiss, Ray Hall, Michael Shermer, Grace Denman, Maira Benjamin, Charles Wynn, Jeff Corey, Greg Winslow and Bob Carroll	150
January 15–18, 2004	Tuscany Casino in Paradise, NV	The Amazing Meeting 2	James Randi, Banachek, Lance Burton, Jamy Ian Swiss, Julia Sweeney, Ian Rowland, Stephen Barrett, Eugenie Scott, Bob Park, Hervey C. Peoples, Teller, Michael Shermer, Dean Cameron, Penn Jillette, Andrew Mayne, Phil Plait, Hal Bidlack, Peter Bowditch, Ray Beiersdorfer, Rick Maue, David Ewalt, Matt Morgan, Victor Isaac and Ray Hall	250
January 13–16, 2005	Stardust Resort & Casino, Paradise, NV	TAM 3 From Eve to Newton The Apple of Knowledge	Teller, Richard Wiseman, Joe Nickell, Jamy Ian Swiss, Michael Shermer, Hal Bidlack, Banachek, Rick Maue, Penn Jillette, Jack LaTona, Ray Hall, Curt Burgess, Liam McDaid, Dean Cameron, Richard Dawkins, James Randi, Andrew Mayne, Jerry Andrus, David Schlosser, Seth Asser, Christopher Hitchens, Julia Sweeney, Phil Plait, Margaret Downey	500
January 26–29, 2006	Stardust Resort & Casino, Paradise, NV	TAM 4 Science in Politics and the Politics of Science	Ben Radford, Murray Gell-Mann, Mac King, Daniel Dennett, Nadine Strossen, Carolyn Porco, Christopher Hitchens, Teller, Richard Wiseman, Stanley Krippner, Kari Byron, Daniel Samber, Robert Lancaster, Dave Thomas, David Richards, Ray Beiersdorfer, Michael Shermer, Phil Plait, Adam Savage, James Randi, Julia Sweeney, Jamy Ian Swiss, Jamie Hyneman, Hal Bidlack, Ed Lu, Karen Russell, Ellen Johnson, Paul Provenza, Todd Robbins, Lawrence O'Donnell (cancelled)	800
January 18–21, 2007	Riviera Casino, Winchester, NV	TAM 5 Skepticism and the Media	Ben Radford, Richard Wiseman, Teller, Ginger Switzer, Christopher Hitchens, Michael Shermer, Todd Robbins, Lee Graham, John Rennie, Rebecca Watson, Banachek, Adam Savage, James Randi, Julia Sweeney, Phil Plait, Jill Sobule, Jamy Ian Swiss, Hal Bidlack, Harriet Hall, Trey Parker, Matt Stone, Diane Swanson, Nick Gillespie, Neil Gershenfeld, Peter Sagal, and Scott Dikkers	800
January 25–27, 2008	Plantation Hotel & Conference Center, Plantation, FL	TAM 5.5 Skepticism and Activism	Brian Dunning, Jeff Wagg, Mark Roberts, Phil Plait, Alison Smith, James Randi, Michael Stackpole, Bart Farkas, Martin Rundkvist, Robert Lancaster, Rebecca Watson, and Kelly Murphy Jolkowski	
June 19–22, 2008	The Flamingo Paradise, NV	TAM 6 Skeptic - Modern Skepticism in the Internet Age	(Keynote) Neil DeGrasse Tyson, PZ Myers, Richard Saunders, Matthew Chapman, Arthur Benjamin, Steven Novella, Ben Goldacre, Tim Farley Ben Radford, Jeff Wagg, Teller, Richard Wiseman, Phil Plait, Michael Shermer, Adam Savage, George Hrab, Alison Smith, Greydon Square, Banachek, Hal Bidlack, James Randi, Lee Graham, Penn Jillette and Sharon Begley	900
July 9–12, 2009	Southpoint Casino, Enterprise, NV	TAM 7	(Keynote) Bill Prady,D. J. Grothe, Jennifer Ouellette, Joseph A. Albietz III, Stephen Bauer, Chip Denman, Harriet Hall, Ray Hall, George Hrab, Ray Hyman, Alison Smith, David Gorski, Teller, Brian Dunning, Tim Farley, Christian Walters, Phil Plait, Jamy Ian Swiss, Rebecca Watson, Steven Novella, Adam Savage, Banachek, Michael Shermer, Derek Bartholomaus, Johnny Thompson, Michael Goudeau, Mac King, Penn Jillette, Victor Isaac and Fintan Steele	1100+
Oct 3–4, 2009	Mermaid Conference Centre, Blackfriars, London	TAM London	James Randi (by Skype), Adam Savage, Jon Ronson, Brian Cox, Simon Singh, Ben Goldacre, Richard Wiseman, Robin Ince, Glen Hill, Tim Minchin, Ariane Sherine, Tim Farley, Phil Plait, George Hrab, Andy Lewis, Martin Robbins, Neil Denny, Rebecca Watson, Chris Cox	500 Tickets sold out within 24 hours
July 8–11, 2010	Southpoint Casino, Enterprise, NV	TAM 8	(Keynote) Richard Dawkins The Skeptics' Guide to the Universe, Roy Zimmerman, Simon Singh, Massimo Pigliucci, Carol Tavris, David Javerbaum, Ginger Campbell, Mike "Jonesy" Jones, Jennifer Michael Hecht, Kendrick Frazier and Sean Faircloth	1300
October 16–17, 2010	Hilton London Metropole, London	TAM London 2010	Richard Dawkins, Alan Moore, Andy Nyman, Adam Rutherford, Richard Wiseman, Susan Blackmore, Cory Doctorow, Marcus Chown, Melinda Gebbie, Tim Minchin and (by video) Stephen Fry	
November 26–28, 2010	Sydney Masonic Centre, Sydney, Australia	TAM OZ	Simon Singh, James Randi, Paul Willis, Brian Dunning, Krissy Wilson, Kylie Sturgess, Pamela Gay, SGU team, George Hrab, Era Segev, Richard Saunders, Karl Kruszelnicki, John Smyrk, Jules Morrow, Dick Smith, Steve Canenne, Simon Taylor, Rob Morrison, Eugenie Scott, Fred Watson and Rachael Dunlop	600+
July 14–17, 2011	Southpoint Casino, Enterprise, NV	TAM 9 From Outer Space	(Keynote) Neil DeGrasse Tyson, Bill Nye, Pamela Gay, Lawrence Krauss, Richard Dawkins, Elizabeth Loftus, Ben Radford and David Gorski	1650
July 12–15, 2012	Southpoint Casino, Enterprise, NV	TAM 2012 Skepticism and the Future	Deirdre Barrett, SGU's Evan Bernstein, Bob Novella and Jay Novella; Eugenie Scott, Robert Blaskiewicz, Bryan & Baxter, Kelly Carlin, Sean Carroll, Hai-Ting Chinn, Miranda Celeste Hale, Richard Dawkins Foundation Elisabeth Cornwell, Christopher DiCarlo, Rachael Dunlop, Stuart Firestein, Julia Galef, Sharon Hill, Bruce Hood, Leo Igwe, Lyz Liddell, Stephen Macknik, Susana Martinez-Conde, Sara Mayhew, Carrie Poppy, Amy Davis Roth, Eve Siebert, Karen Stollznow, Brian Thompson, and Michael Vassar	
July 11–14, 2013	Southpoint Casino, Enterprise, NV	TAM 2013 Fighting the Fakers	(Keynote) Susan Jacoby, Dan Ariely, Banachek, Joshie Berger, Evan Bernstein, Russell Blackford, Susan Blackmore, Bob Blaskiewicz, Peter Boghossian, Bryan & Baxter, Edward Clint, Mark Crislip, Elisabeth Cornwell, Jerry Coyne, Chip Denman, Barbara Drescher, Sanal Edamaruku, Mark Edward, Tim Farley, Faye Flam, Susan Gerbic, David Gorski, Shane Greenup, D. J. Grothe, Susan Haack, Miranda Celeste Hale, Harriet Hall, Kyle Hill, Sharon Hill, Ray Hyman, Leo Igwe, David Jones, Marty Klein, Reed Kuhn, Caleb Lack, John W. Loftus, Daniel Loxton, Michael E. Mann, Max Maven, Sara Mayhew, Maria Myrback, Bob Novella, Jay Novella, Steve Novella, Jennifer Ouellette, Penn & Teller, Massimo Pigliucci, Massimo Polidoro, Don Prothero, Paul Provenza, John Rennie, Stuart J. Robbins, Todd Robbins, Edwina Rogers, Jacques Rousseau, Cara Santa Maria, Richard Saunders, Joe Schwarcz, Robert Sheaffer, Nakul Shenoy, Michael Shermer, Eve Siebert, Karen Stollznow, Jamy Ian Swiss, Brian Thompson, and Brent Weedman	1000+
July 10–13, 2014	Southpoint Casino, Enterprise, NV	Skepticism and the Brain	(keynote) Michael Shermer, Bob Blaskiewicz, Robert Kuizban, Robert Stern, Jay Novella, Jon Armstrong, Sarah Lowe, Kernan Coleman, Krill Alferov, Krystyn Lambert, Kyle Saunders, Ani Aharonian, Peter Boghossian, Banachek, Barbara Drescher, Beth Ann Erickson, Bob Novella, Chip Denman, Chris Guest, Christina Shellska, Donald Prothero, Ed Clint, Eddie Tabash, Steven Novella, Steve Cuno, Sheldon Helms, Jacques Rousseau, James Underdown, Evan Bernstein, Eugine Burger, Paul Provenza, Penn Jillette, Scott Lilienfield, Stuart Robbins, Robert Kurzban, Karl Kruszelnicki, D. J. Grothe, George Hrab, Carol Tavris, Karen Stollznow, Eugenie Scott, Sally Satel, Elizabeth Loftus, Julia Galef, Ray Hall, Patricia Churchland, Ginger Campbell, Mariette DiChristina, (keynote) Daniel Dennett, James Randi, Massimo Polidoro, Sally Satel, Wendy Hughes, (keynote) Bill Nye, Richard Saunders, Daniel Loxton, Sharon Hill, David Gorski, Jon Bronson, Vandy Beth Glenn, Sara Mayhew, Michael Carbunaro, Miranda Celeste Hale, Michelle Knaier, Mike Jones, Eve Siebert, Jamy Ian Swiss, Harriet Hall, Heather Henderson, Susan Gerbic	
July 16–19, 2015	Tropicana Casino, Las Vegas, NV	TAM13 A Celebration of a Reasoned Life	George Hrab, James Alcock, Helen Arney, Jim Baggott, Deborah Berebichez, Evan Bernstein, Dean Cameron, Timothy Caulfield, Robin Elisabeth Cornwell, Yvette d'Entremont, Brian Deer, Chip Denman, Derek Colanduno, Grace Denman, Dean Edell, Tim Farley, Jim Gardner, Harriet Hall, Jamy Ian Swiss, Sharon Hill, Bruce Hood, Ray Hyman, Robert Kenner, Steven Mould, Jay Novella, Bob Novella, Robert Sheaffer, Steven Novella, Matt Parker, John Allen Paulos, Massimo Pigliucci, Massimo Polidoro, Natalia Reagan, Dana S. Richards, Todd Robbins, Edwina Rogers, Anna R. Rönnlund, Ola Rosling, Hans Rosling, Eugenie Scott, Sherry Seethaler, Simon Singh, Taner Edis, Julia Galef, Susan Gerbic, Ray Hall, Jim Lippard, Michael Shermer, James McGaha, Colm Mulcahy, Richard Saunders, Jay Diamond, Robert Knaier, L. Kirk Hagen, Stephen Hupp, Kathleen Dyer, Christine Shellska	
