= Robert Lancaster =

Robert Lancaster may refer to:

- Robert S. Lancaster (1958–2019), American computer programmer and skeptic
- Bobbi Lancaster (born 1950), family physician, champion golfer, author, human rights advocate, and motivational speaker
