= Sara Mayhew =

Canadian writer and graphic artist

Sara E. Mayhew
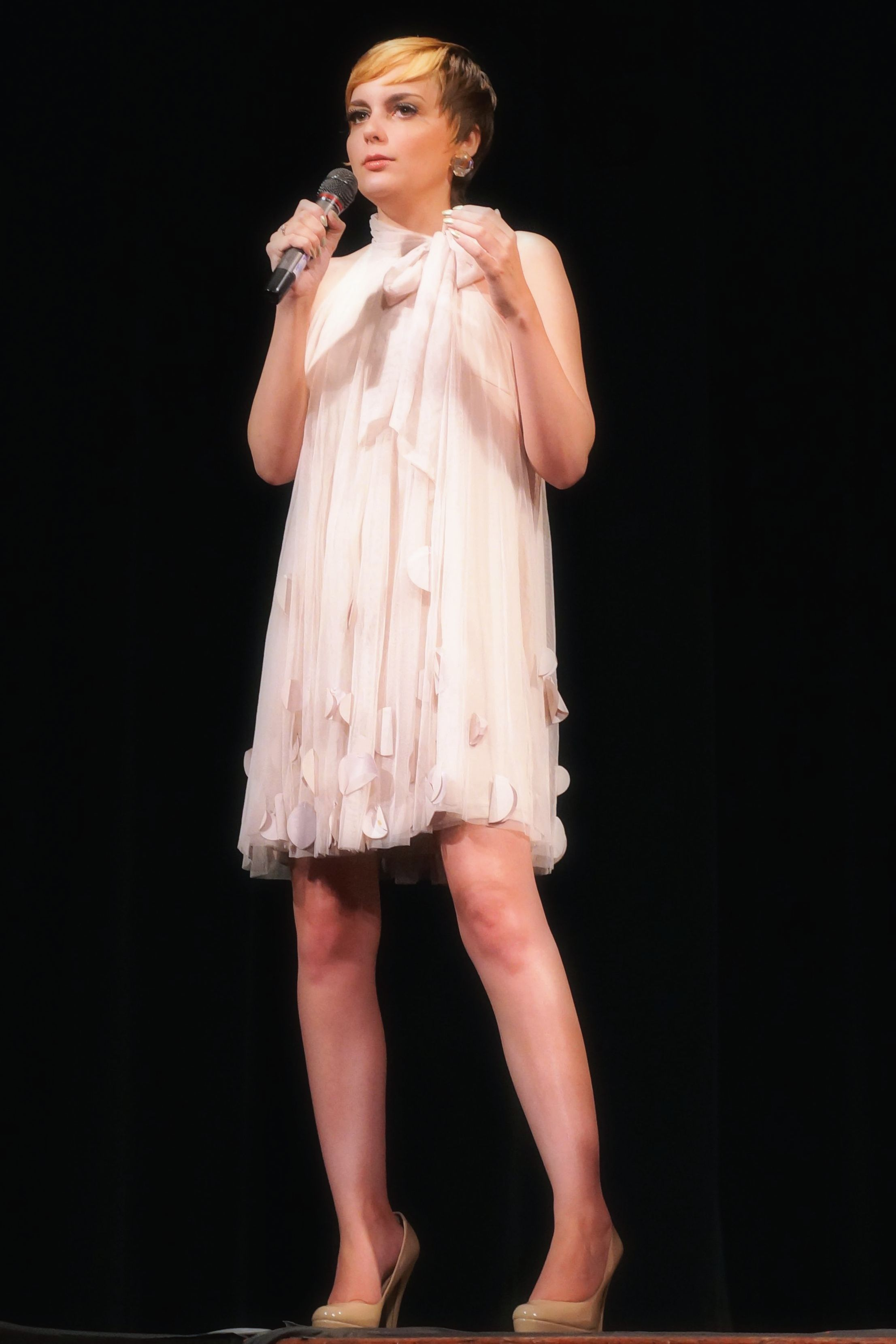
- Sara Mayhew speaking at TAM 2012 in Las Vegas, Nevada – July 2012.
- Born: 16 July 1984 (age 41); Kirkland Lake, Ontario
- Education: Kirkland Lake Collegiate And Vocational Institute, Canadore College
- Known for: Manga artist, writer, illustrator
- Notable work: Creator of Secrets of Sorcerers, Love Pet, and Legend of the Ztarr
- Awards: International Anime and Manga Festival (IMAF) 2004 award "Best Comic for Teens". Recipient of an Ontario Arts Council 2007 and 2011 Northern Arts grant.

Sara Mayhew (born 16 July 1984 in Kirkland Lake, Ontario) is a writer and graphic artist who works in English-language manga. Mayhew studied graphic design at Canadore College in North Bay, Ontario from 2002 to 2005. The recipient of a TED Fellowship, Mayhew spoke at the TED Fellows stage and was featured at an independent TEDx event in Sudbury, Ontario.

== Career ==
Secrets of Sorcerers, Mayhew's first published work, was a webcomic. In 2005, she redrew it for print publication. The Ontario Arts Council awarded Mayhew a Northern Arts grant to finance Secrets of Sorcerers Vol. 2. The work also received an award from the International Manga and Anime Festival, a discontinued convention once held at County Hall in the UK, London by the now defunct County Hall Animation Studio.

In 2006, Mayhew illustrated the children's book The First Emperor by Vicki Low, about Prince Fu Su son of Emperor Zheng, and self-published the short webcomic Love Pet.

In 2008 Mayhew began work on the Legend of the Ztarr, which she self-published in serial form in 2011 with the aid of a grant from the Ontario Arts Council. In 2013, Mayhew launched a crowdfunding campaign to extend the series, but as of 2022, the project was not completed and the crowdfund was not fulfilled.

In 2016 Mayhew illustrated the sketch and reference guide IDRAW MANGA.

== Skepticism ==
Mayhew wrote in skeptical periodicals and spoke on podcasts and at conventions about how she used her art to reflect her skeptical viewpoint.

== Awards ==
- 2011: Northern Arts Grant Recipient, Ontario Arts Council (for Legend of the Ztarr)
- 2007: Northern Arts Grant Recipient, Ontario Arts Council (for Secrets of Sorcerers)
- 2005: Best Teens Comic Strip – International Manga & Anime Festival (for Secrets of Sorcerers)

== Books ==
- Mayhew, Sara (2011). Legend of the Ztarr Ch. 2: The Sword of Ztarr. Amazon Digital Services. ASIN B0056KOSWK.
- Mayhew, Sara (2011). Legend of the Ztarr Ch. 1: The Offworlders. Amazon Digital Services. ASIN B004URRZN4.
- Mayhew, Sara (2006). The First Emperor (Steck-Vaughn Timeline). Steck Vaughn. ISBN 978-1419031953.
- Mayhew, Sara (2006). "Love Pet". Ztarr Manga Studio.
- Mayhew, Sara (2005). Secrets of Sorcerers. Ztarr Manga Studio. ISBN 978-0973884104.
