= The Montel Williams Show =

American tabloid talk show (1991–2008)

- Genre: Tabloid talk show
- Presented by: Montel Williams
- Country of origin: United States
- Original language: English
- No. of seasons: 17
- No. of episodes: 4,325

Production
- Executive producer: Montel Williams
- Camera setup: Multi-camera setup
- Running time: 60 minutes
- Production companies: Mountain Movers Productions (1996–2008) (seasons 6–17); United Television Productions (1991–2006) (seasons 1–15); Out of My Way Productions (1991–1996) (seasons 1–5); Montel B. Williams Inc. (1992–1995) (seasons 2–4); The Fields Organization (1992–1995) (seasons 2–4); Katz/Rush Entertainment (1992–1995) (seasons 2–4); Chris-Craft Television Productions; Viacom Enterprises (1991–1994) (seasons 1–3); Paramount Domestic Television (1994–2006) (seasons 4–15); CBS Paramount Domestic Television (2006–2007) (seasons 15–17); CBS Television Distribution (2007–2008) (season 17)

Original release
- Network: Syndication
- Release: July 8, 1991 – May 16, 2008

The Montel Williams Show (Note: The show's title is commonly shortened to Montel.) is an American daytime talk show that was hosted by Montel Williams. The show ran in syndication for seventeen seasons from July 8, 1991, to May 16, 2008, in which it broadcast 4,325 episodes.

== History ==
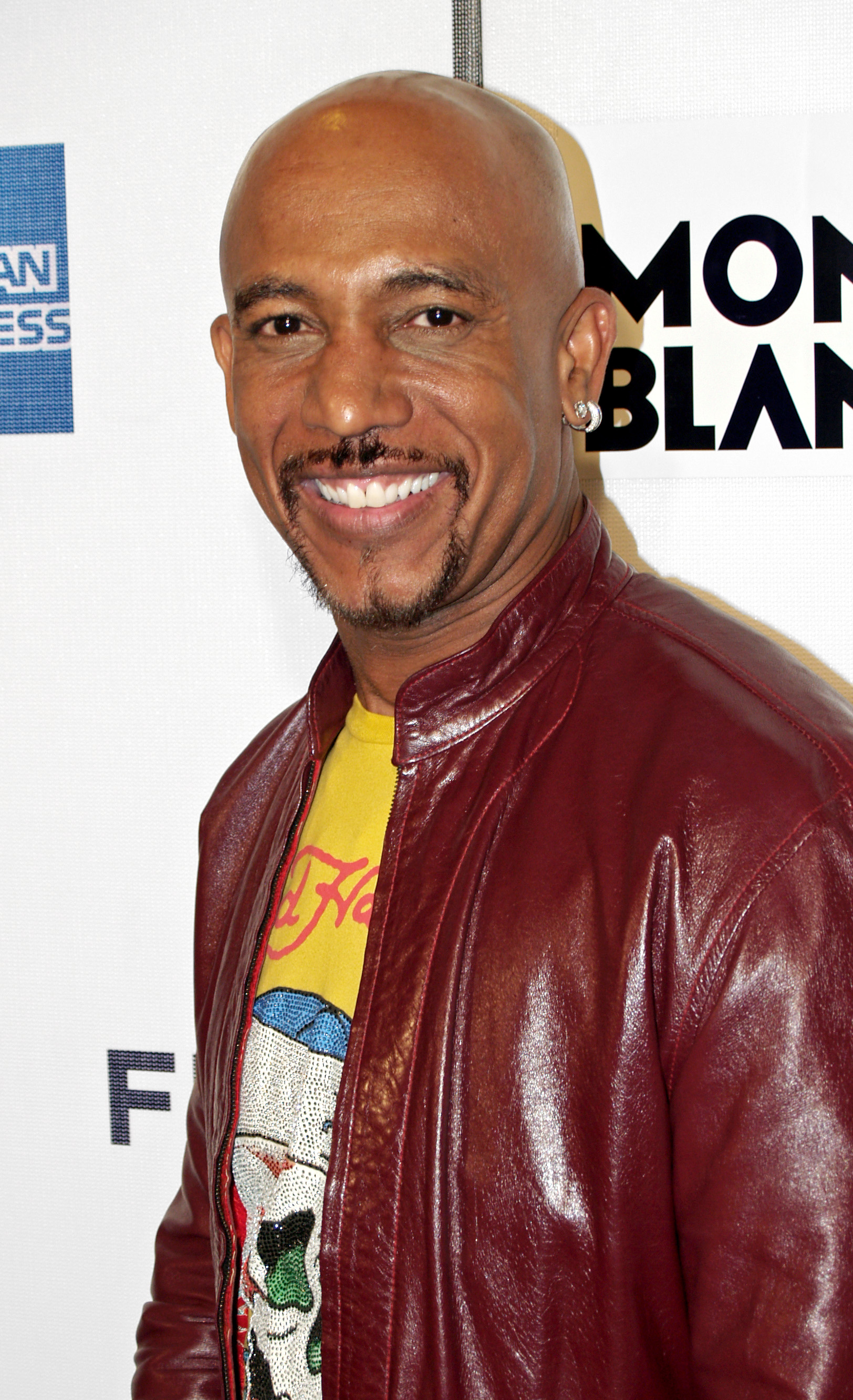

The series premiered July 8, 1991, with a thirteen-week trial run in select American markets. Based on its initial performance, the program entered national syndication beginning with its 14th broadcast week. In its early years, Montel was similar to most tabloid talk shows especially The Jerry Springer Show. As time went on, however, the genre became less popular, and toward the end of the show's run, Montel usually focused on inspirational stories and less controversial subjects. Common themes seen on Montel include finding lost loves, reuniting mothers who gave their children up for adoption, or stories of strong women who faced certain danger (such as rape or attempted murder) and fought their way out. Multiple sclerosis was also a frequent topic, as Williams suffers from the disease.

Most Wednesdays (and sometimes on Fridays as well during the summer), self-proclaimed psychic Sylvia Browne was Montel's guest, and performed psychic readings of guests as well as discussing her ideas about spirituality and the afterlife. Her predictions have been the target for much criticism, and her psychic abilities explained as cold reading by critics such as Robert S. Lancaster. She refused to partake in the One Million Dollar Paranormal Challenge from James Randi, a prominent skeptic.

During its final week on the air, Montel's television talk show aired a series of clip shows known as "Finale Week" looking back on the show's past 17 seasons, including past guests and Browne's past appearances on the show.

=== Production and distribution ===
The series was produced by Mountain Movers for its entire run, with Out of My Way Productions co-producing on its first four seasons and then Letnom Productions for the following two seasons. The first three seasons were distributed by Viacom Enterprises. After Viacom's purchase of Paramount Pictures in March 1994, Viacom Enterprises was merged into Paramount Television's distribution arm, Paramount Domestic Television. PDT began distributing the show in fall 1994, and became CBS Paramount Domestic Television after the Viacom/CBS Corporation split in 2006. Its distributor changed names once again in 2007, as CPDT was merged with King World Productions to form the current distributor, CBS Television Distribution.

Montel originated from Television City in Hollywood, California, for its first season. For season two, the show moved to Unitel Video's studio space on West 53rd Street in New York City, where it remained for the rest of its run.

On January 30, 2008, the end of production of new episodes of The Montel Williams Show at the end of the 2007–2008 television season was announced.

== Reception ==
=== Critical response ===
New York listed it as one of the worst television shows of 1995.

=== Awards and nominations ===
Awards and nominations
Award	Year (Note: Indicates the year of ceremony)	Category	Nominee(s)	Result	Ref.
Prism Awards	2004	TV Talk Show Series Episode	"Children of Meth Moms"	Nominated	
GLAAD Media Awards	2006	Outstanding Talk Show Episode	"Twins: Identical but Different"	Nominated	

== Cancellation and further developments ==
It was reported in Variety that CBS TV Distribution terminated the show when key Fox-owned stations chose not to renew it for the 2008–2009 season. The final episode aired in most markets on May 16, 2008, with some markets airing it at a later date (one week later).

In June 2008, Ofcom of the UK ruled that ITV2 (which aired the show during its run) "breached standards with a repeat of the Montel Williams Show in which a 'desperate' couple were told by self-professed psychic Sylvia Browne that their missing son, Shawn Hornbeck was dead - even though he turned up alive the previous year." The ruling concerned "breaching rule 2.1 of the Broadcasting Code, which relates to protecting viewers against offensive material."
