= David Gorski =

American surgical oncologist

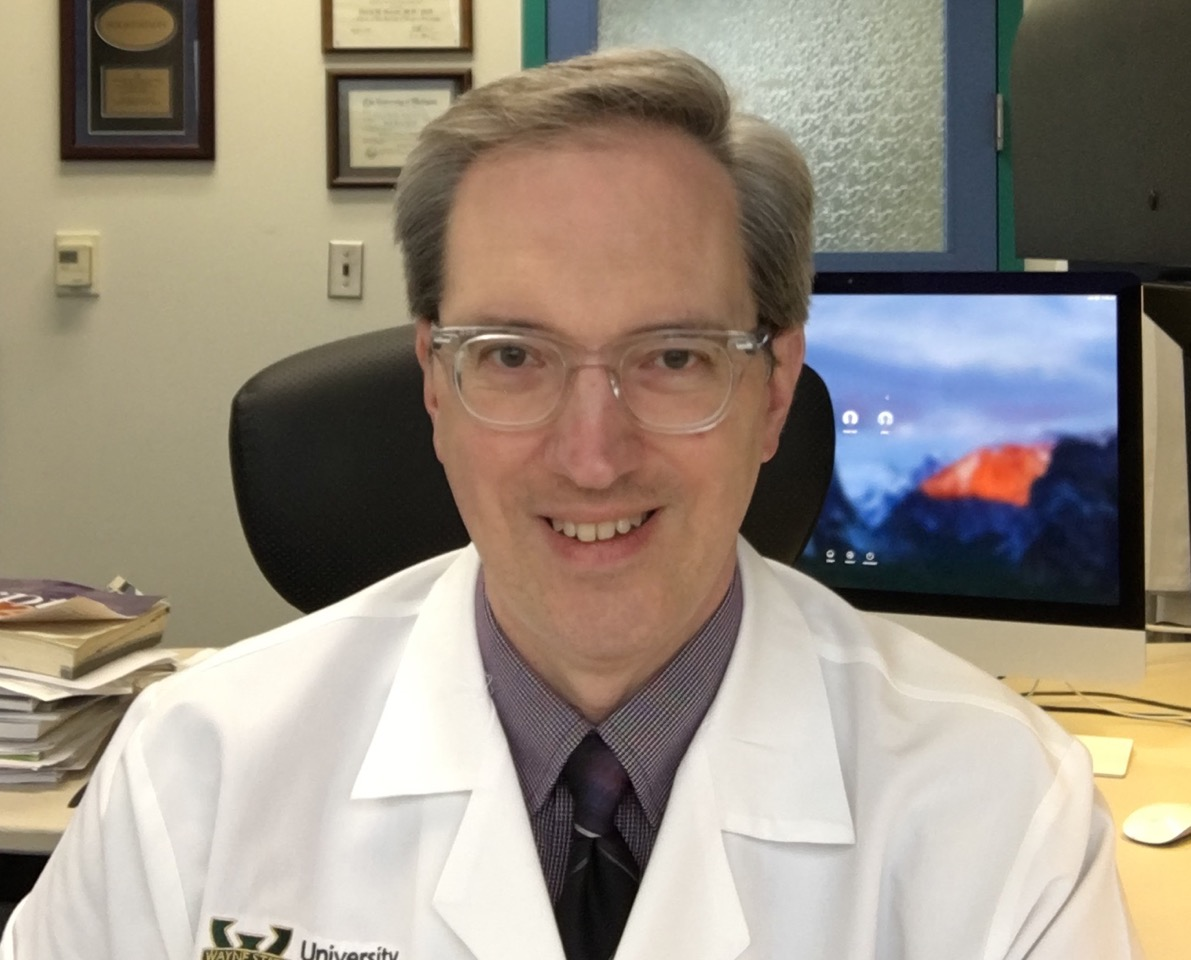
- Gorski in 2016
- Born: David Henry Gorski
- Education: University of Michigan (MD); Case Western Reserve University (PhD)
- Scientific career
- Fields: Surgical oncology
- Workplaces: Wayne State University School of Medicine; Karmanos Cancer Institute
- Doctoral advisor: Kenneth Walsh

David Henry Gorski is an American surgical oncologist and professor of surgery at Wayne State University School of Medicine. He specializes in breast cancer surgery at the Karmanos Cancer Institute. Gorski is an outspoken skeptic and critic of alternative medicine and the anti-vaccination movement. He writes as Orac at Respectful Insolence and as himself at Science-Based Medicine, where he is the managing editor.

== Early life and education ==
Gorski attended a Roman Catholic high school. He went on to study medicine at the University of Michigan, earning an MD in 1988. He entered a residency in general surgery in 1989 at the University Hospitals of Cleveland. Gorski completed a PhD in cellular physiology at Case Western Reserve University in 1994. His dissertation was entitled "Homeobox Gene Expression and Regulation in Vascular Myocytes". Gorski continued his residency (1993–96) and completed a surgical oncology research fellowship (1996–99) at The University of Chicago.

Prior to 2005, he was active on the early internet message boards of Usenet participating in flame wars.

== Career ==
In the mid 2000s, Gorski taught surgery as an associate professor at the Rutgers Cancer Institute of New Jersey and the Robert Wood Johnson Medical School, at Rutgers University.

In 2007 he received the Advanced Clinical Research Award in Breast Cancer from the American Society of Clinical Oncology. He was awarded research grants by The Breast Cancer Research Foundation in 2008, 2009, and 2010.

In 2008, Gorski joined the Wayne State University School of Medicine and became affiliated with the Karmanos Cancer Institute. He is a professor of surgery and oncology at the Wayne State University School of Medicine, whose laboratory conducts research on transcriptional regulation of vascular endothelial cell phenotype, as well as the role of metabotropic glutamate receptors in breast cancer. In 2009, he was appointed the cancer liaison physician for the American College of Surgeons Committee on Cancer.

He became the co-director of the Michigan Breast Oncology Quality Initiative in 2013.

Gorski is listed as a founder of the Institute for Science in Medicine and as a member of the American Society of Clinical Oncology.

=== Research ===
Gorski's 1999 article "Blockade of the vascular endothelial growth factor stress response increases the antitumor effects of ionizing radiation", characterizing the effects of angiogenesis inhibitors on the effectiveness of anti-tumor therapies, has been cited over 900 times according to PubMed. This research has been used in anti-tumor therapeutic research, including an observation that angiogenesis inhibitors enhanced the therapeutic effects of ionizing radiation "by preventing repair of radiation damage to endothelial cells", and in determining the potential of combinational therapies to allow reduction of the dosages in toxic conventional treatments while sustaining tumor regression when combined with specific antibodies and radiation therapy.

Gorski's work with Helena Mauceri and others, published in Nature in 1998 as "Combined effects of angiostatin and ionizing radiation in antitumour therapy" studied the "combined effects of angiostatin" (a protein occurring in several animal species) "and ionizing radiation in anti-tumor therapy" led to investigation into the selective destruction of tumor cells, which according to a 1999 study by Gregg L. Semenza (citing Mauceri and others), "are more hypoxic than normal cells", allowing for "tumor cells to be killed without major systemic side effects".

In 2008, Gorski and Yun Chen published an article titled "Regulation of angiogenesis through a microRNA (miR-130a) that down-regulates antiangiogenic homeobox genes GAX and HOXA5" that investigated the use of microRNA to regulate angiogenesis.

== Skepticism of alternative medicine ==
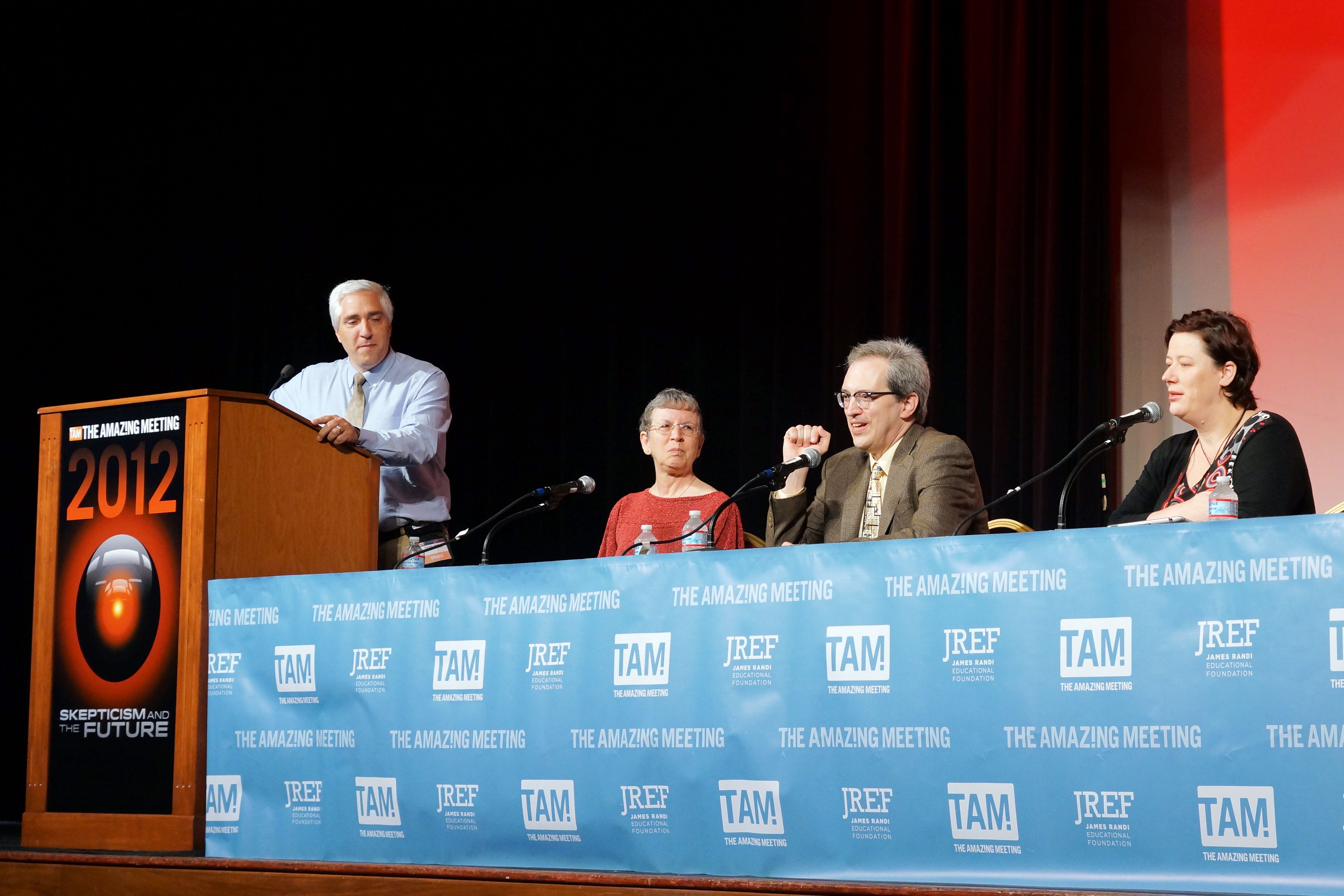
Skeptics Steven Novella, Harriet Hall, David Gorski, and Rachael Dunlop on a panel at The Amaz!ng Meeting 2012

Gorski is a vocal skeptic of alternative medicine and has criticized pseudoscience.

He has criticized the prevalence of pseudoscience in the medical field including the use of alternative therapies, acupuncture, detoxification, and the use of dietary treatment to manage autism.

=== Blogs ===
Gorski is a prolific blogger. In 2004, he began writing a blog entitled Respectful Insolence at Blogspot under the pen name Orac. Respectful Insolence was then moved to the ScienceBlogs website. Alissa Quart, writing for Columbia Journalism Review in 2010, described Orac as a "self-appointed autism expert" known for attacking the "vaccines-cause-autism set" and who had recently celebrated when an opponent lost their medical license. In 2015, writing for Slate, Jacob Brogan said Orac was a "doctor who blogs about skepticism and medicine".

In 2008 Gorski started blogging at Science-Based Medicine under his real name while continuing to blog as Orac at Respectful Insolence. He was later doxed as Orac. As the managing editor at Science-Based Medicine, Gorski has posted on issues of medicine and pseudoscience, including the anti-vaccination movement, alternative therapies, and cancer research and treatment. In 2010, Gorski recounted how members of the anti-vaccine blog Age of Autism wrote to the board of directors at Wayne State University and asked that he be prevented from blogging.

Writing for The Atlantic in 2011, David H. Freedman described Gorski as one of the more "prickly anti-alternative-medicine warriors" and said he was "among a small, loud band of alt-med critics".

Gorski contributed to the James Randi Education Foundation's series of EBooks: Science Based Medicine Guides. He is a fellow of the Committee for Skeptical Inquiry. He was a speaker at The Amaz!ng Meeting in 2009, 2010, 2012 and 2013 and has been a participant on several panels on alternative medicine. He called attention to a 2005 paper by John Ioannidis on problems with published research.

Gorski has advocated for open research data of clinical trial results and for using only evidence-based medicine to treat disease. He has been critical of Senator Tom Harkin's support of the National Center for Complementary and Alternative Medicine (NCCAM), which became the National Center for Complementary and Integrative Health. He has criticized the National Institutes of Health (NIH) and NCCAM for funding and publishing research on unproven therapies not supported by science-based evidence, and has commented on medical ethics and methods of alternative medicine.

Gorski has criticized popularization of pseudoscience by the media and celebrities such as Oprah Winfrey, Bill Maher, Ann Coulter, and The Huffington Post. In June 2013, he expressed support for healthcare professionals speaking out against poor medical practices and the sale of unproven treatments. Gorski was interviewed by WPRR in 2012. He criticized the American Medical Student Association for their co-sponsorship of an Integrative Medicine Day.

In September 2014, Gorski and fellow skeptic Steven Novella published an article in Trends in Molecular Medicine denouncing the study of integrative medicine as harmful to science. The following month Gorski also published an article critical of integrative oncology in Nature Reviews Cancer. Several months later, six of his colleagues responded to the editor to express concerns with his view on integrative oncology, arguing that, in their opinion, his "article selectively focuses on practices with the weakest mechanistic evidence base", such as homeopathy and reiki.

== Personal life ==
Gorski is married. Gorski describes himself as an aspiring ally of marginalized communities, and has in recent years begun to identify as a center-left Democrat with progressive views on social justice issues.

== Publications ==
- Speyer, Cecilia L.; Nassar, Mahdy A.; Hachem, Ali H.; Bukhsh, Miriam A.; Jafry, Waris S.; Khansa, Rafa M.; Gorski, David H. (4 May 2016). "Riluzole mediates anti-tumor properties in breast cancer cells independent of metabotropic glutamate receptor-1". Breast Cancer Research and Treatment. 157 (2): 217–228. doi:10.1007/s10549-016-3816-x. PMID 27146584. S2CID 23986691.
- Welch HG, Gorski DH, Albertsen PC (2015). "Trends in Metastatic Breast and Prostate Cancer—Lessons in Cancer Dynamics". N Engl J Med. 373 (18): 1685–1687. doi:10.1056/NEJMp1510443. PMID 26510017.
- Gorski D. H. (2014). "Integrative oncology: really the best of both worlds?". Nat Rev Cancer. 14 (10): 692–700. doi:10.1038/nrc3822. PMID 25230880. S2CID 33539406.
- 2018 Pseudoscience: The Conspiracy Against Science "Integrative' Medicine: Integrating Quackery with Science-Based Medicine" :MIT Press: edited by Allison B. Kaufman, James C. Kaufman: ISBN 978-0262037426
