= Robert S. Lancaster =

American computer programmer and skeptical activist (1958–2019)

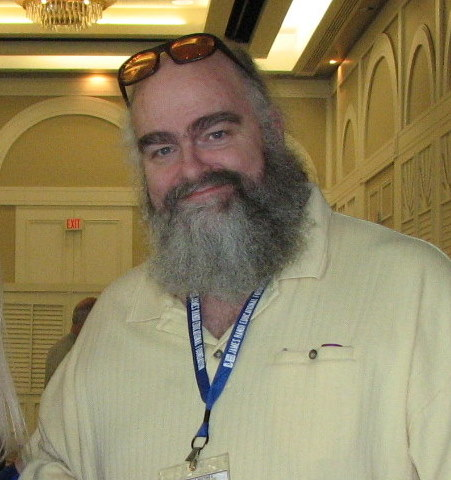
- Lancaster on July 9, 2008, at TAM 6
- Born: 11 February 1958; Monterey Park, California
- Died: 9 September 2019 (aged 61)
- Occupation: Computer programmer
- Known for: Stop Kaz, Stop Sylvia Browne
- Spouse: Susan Lancaster
- Website: www.stopsylvia.com

Robert Starrett Lancaster (February 11, 1958 – September 9, 2019) was an American computer programmer and skeptical activist who created the websites Stop Kaz and Stop Sylvia Browne.

== Software career ==
Lancaster's first web presence was The Bob Lancaster Gallery of Unusual Playing Cards, a site devoted to displaying some of his large collection of decks of playing cards. The site existed from 1996 until 2008 when AOL shut down member websites. Lancaster also created several shareware DOS computer games known collectively as The MicroLink Games.

== Skeptical activism ==
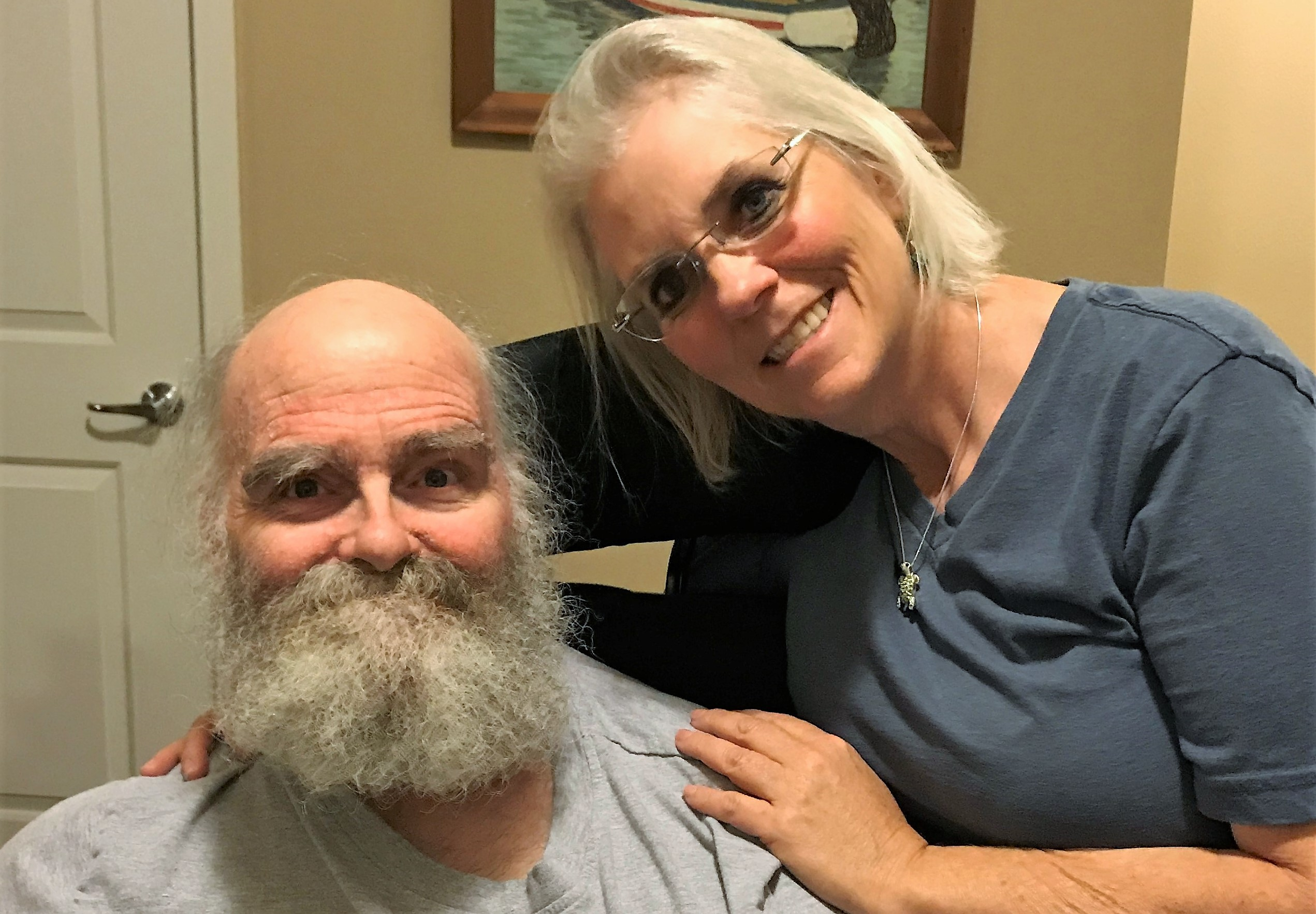
Lancaster with Susan Gerbic in 2017.

Lancaster's first skeptical web site, Stop Kaz, went online in September 2004. It is devoted to critical examination of the public statements of Kaz Demille-Jacobsen. She claimed to be a survivor of the September 11 attacks and gave speeches on that topic. "Everything that she claimed seemed to be a lie", Lancaster found. He documented his efforts to create the site in a paper presented at TAM 4 in 2006.

Lancaster opened Stop Sylvia Browne, a web site devoted to critically examining the claims of self-proclaimed psychic Sylvia Browne, in November 2006. He said he did so because, "I found her work with missing children to be incredibly offensive." Lancaster has subsequently been interviewed as an expert on Browne's missteps in the Shawn Hornbeck case on CNN and elsewhere. The site has also documented other failings of Browne, including the Holly Krewson missing person case. In a 2002 episode of The Montel Williams Show, Browne said Krewson was at that time working as a stripper in Los Angeles; however, in 2006, her dental records were matched to a body that had been found in 1996. In 2013, Browne again came under criticism for her false prediction about Amanda Berry.

Lancaster presented at skeptic conferences including The Amazing Meeting (TAM) in 2006, 2007, 2008 and 2009. He has been interviewed on The Paul Harris Show, Penn Radio, The Skeptics' Guide to the Universe, Beyond Reality Radio and The Paracast.

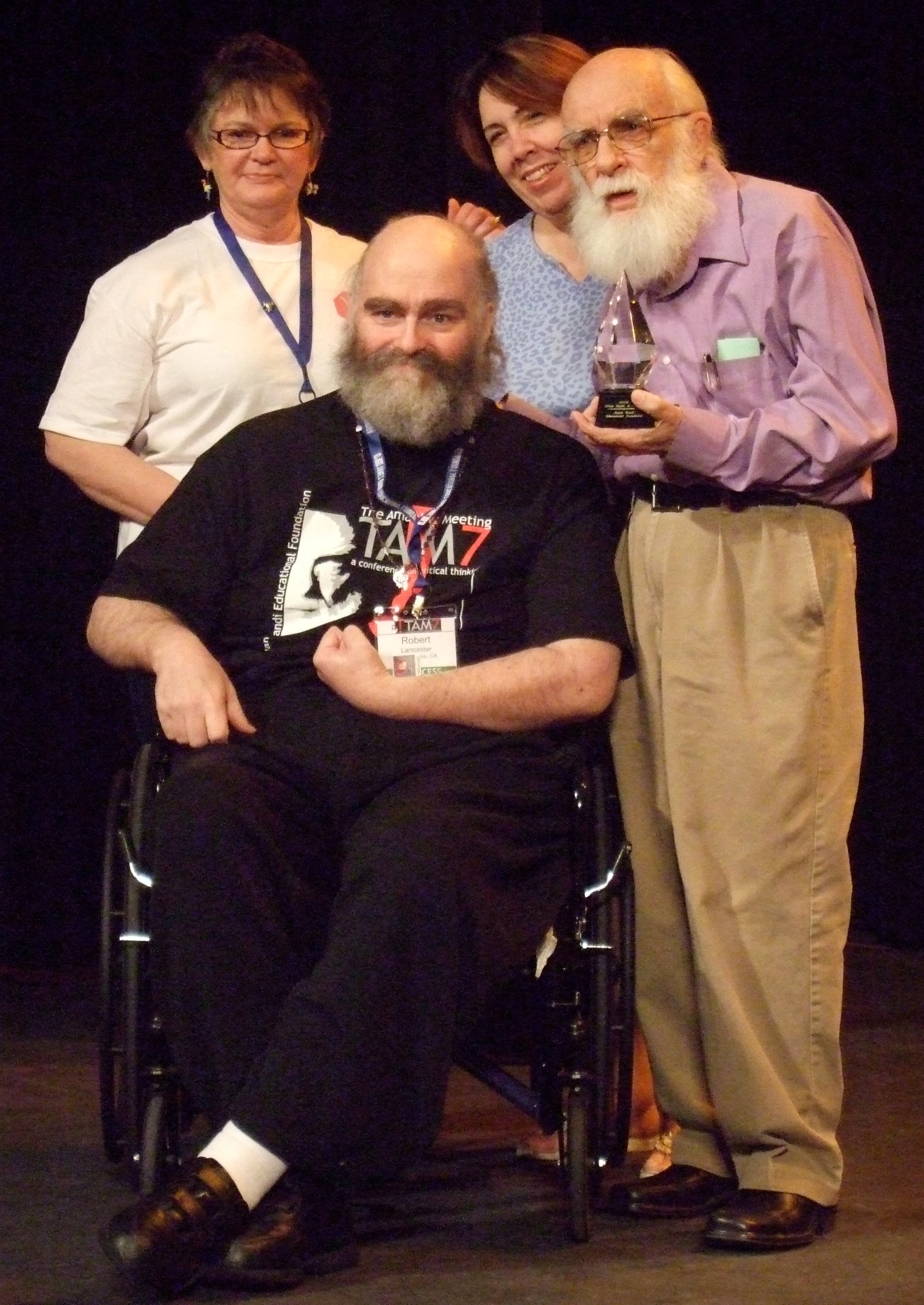
Lancaster with James Randi receiving the Citizen Skeptic Award, July 11, 2009.

In October 2008, during Lancaster's recovery from a stroke he suffered several months prior, the domain registration for StopSylvia.com lapsed and was purchased by Boris Kreiman, who replaced the site with one advertising psychic services. When challenged by supporters of Lancaster, Kreiman offered to sell the domain back for $20,000 and put it up for auction. Lancaster's wife decided not to negotiate with Kreiman, and instead moved the site to an existing alternate domain, StopSylviaBrowne.com.

On July 11, 2009, Lancaster received the Citizen Skeptic Award from the James Randi Educational Foundation at TAM 7 in Las Vegas, Nevada for his work as a skeptical activist. He had recovered sufficiently from his stroke to receive the award in person.

In September 2010 Lancaster was interviewed in STOCKYARD Magazine. "People want answers", Lancaster said. "Answers to questions which, often, nobody else has been able to answer for them. Answers which law enforcement officials, medical providers, and loved ones cannot provide."

In March 2011 Lancaster began hosting the Internet radio show Resident Skeptic on the Para-X Paranormal radio network, in which he gives the skeptical point of view on various paranormal topics. Three months later Lancaster stepped down from hosting Resident Skeptic due to medical issues.

== Health issues ==
On August 4, 2008, Lancaster suffered a stroke, and was hospitalized for some time after. He spent much of the next year in recovery, which his wife, Susan Lancaster, documented via online posts.

On June 5, 2011 Lancaster suffered a minor heart attack in his home in Salem, Oregon. The attack, and his subsequent three-day hospitalization, were documented by Lancaster and his wife in a thread titled "RSL in hospital . . . again" on the James Randi Educational Foundation forum.

Lancaster died September 9, 2019.
