= Jamy Ian Swiss =

American magician (born 1952)

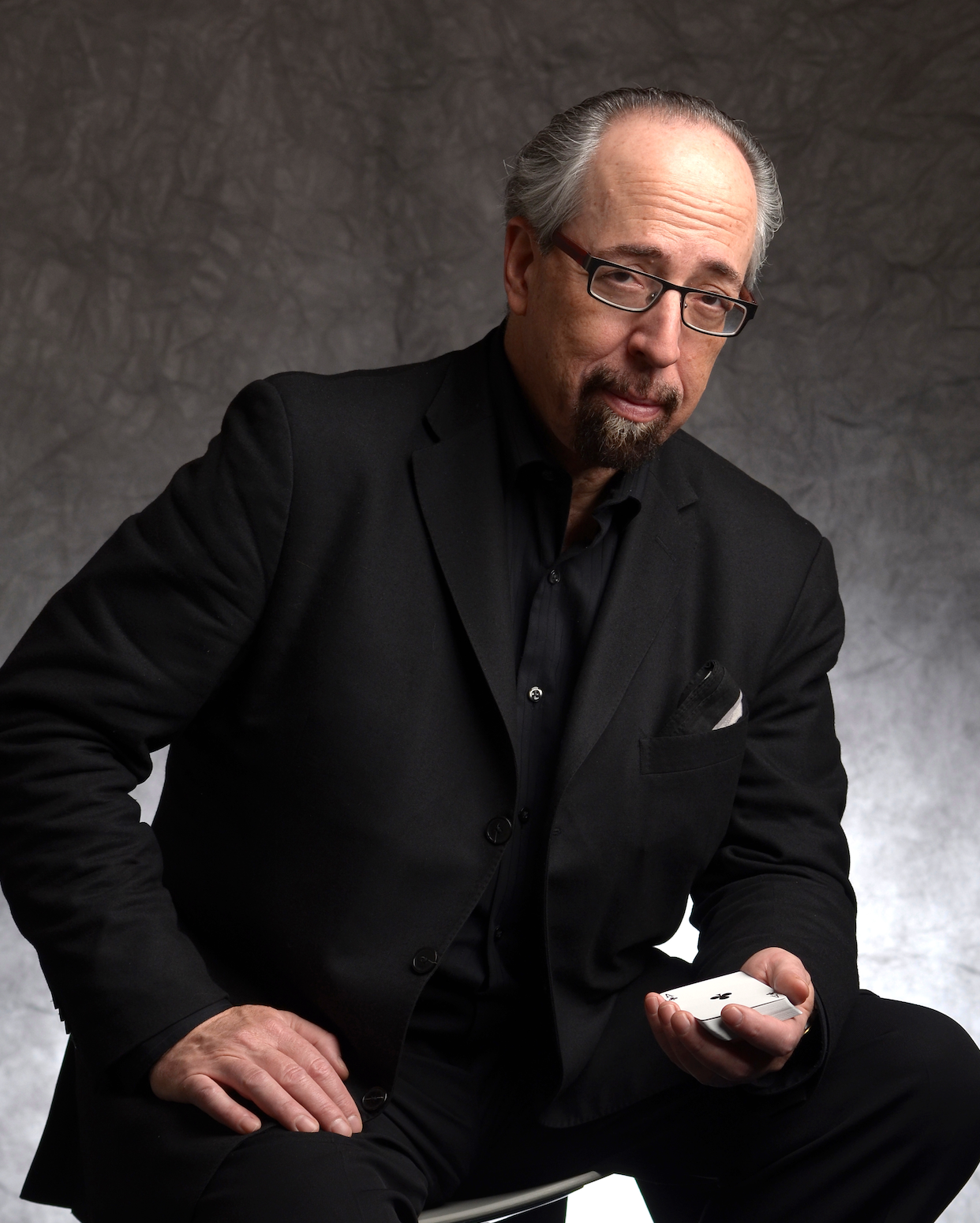
- Occupation: Magician
- Website: www.jamyianswiss.com

Jamy Ian Swiss (born November 30, 1952, in Brooklyn, New York) is an American magician, author, speaker, historian of magic, essayist, book reviewer, and scientific skeptic. He is known for sleight-of-hand with playing cards.

== Magic ==
Swiss is a sleight-of-hand performer who specializes in close-up card magic, stage magic, and mentalism. He first got into magic at age 7.

He has spoken and performed across the United States, including for companies such as Adobe, and Evernote and for the Smithsonian Institution, as well as at The Magic Castle. He has spoken at The New Yorker Festival. He is a frequent guest speaker at the EG creativity and innovation conference.

His show of intimate sleight-of-hand magic, Magic: Close-up in Concert, ran for six months at the Rainbow Room in New York City. It was remounted in San Diego in 2017.

Swiss is a co-founder and currently a co-producer and performer for Monday Night Magic, New York City's longest running Off-Broadway show.

In 2000, Swiss presented a one-man show The Honest Liar as part of the New York International Fringe Festival. It was produced by Premiere Productions.

== Writing ==
Jamy Ian Swiss is the author of the essay collections Shattering Illusions, Devious Standards and Preserving Mystery, all three of which have been reissued in a combined trilogy boxed set.

He is the author of the book "Conjurer's Conundrum" which deals with the intersection of magic and skepticism.

He is also a co-author of the companion volume to the PBS documentary The Art of Magic, and the "Explaining Magic" chapter of Visual Explanations by Edward Tufte.

Additionally, he has contributed to, or consulted on, the following books, among others:

1. Pogue, David; Magic for Dummies
2. Penn & Teller's How to Play with Your Food
3. Gaiman, Neil; American Gods
4. Macknick, Stephen & Martinez-Conde, Susana; Sleights of Mind: What the Neuroscience of Magic Reveals about Our Everyday Deceptions
5. Palmer, Amanda (11 November 2014). The Art of Asking: How I Learned to Stop Worrying and Let People Help. New York: Grand Central Publishing. ISBN 978-1455581085.
6. Lovick, John; Switch: Unfolding the $100 Bill Change
7. McCabe, Pete; Scripting Magic
8. Riser, Harry; Secrets of an Escomateur

Swiss co-wrote (and wrote the foreword to) the two-volume book set entitled The Magic of Johnny Thompson, which details the secrets of seventy-eight of famed magician Johnny Thompson's most celebrated magic routines.

He has written for Skeptic magazine, wrote for Genii, the Conjurors’ Magazine from April 1993 to January 2013, and contributed a regular column of essays for the quarterly magic journal Antimony.

He wrote a regular column of magic book reviews entitled The Lyon's Den as well as a 71-part series called Take Two, which pays tribute to important figures and additional subjects in the history of magic, including commentary on curated video selections.

== Teaching magic and consulting ==
He has lectured to magicians in 13 countries. He also created and produces Card Clinic, an "intensive seminar on sleight-of-hand magic with playing cards."

He is regarded as a mentor, instructor, and consultant to magicians and has been called the "must-read, must-fear Michiko Kakutani of magic publishing".

== Scientific skepticism ==
A longtime scientific skeptic, Jamy Ian Swiss has spoken widely to skeptic groups and conferences around the United States.

He has been featured in on-stage events about skepticism and magic with Penn and Teller, Ray Hyman, and others.

Swiss is a co-founder of the New York City Skeptics and the National Capital Area Skeptics and as a skeptic of the paranormal, he has been a longtime critic of "unethical mentalists" and "psychic con artists" who use "supernatural deceit" for personal gain.

He was a Senior Fellow of the James Randi Educational Foundation (JREF) where he also served as a member of the Million Dollar Challenge committee (by which the foundation offered a million dollar prize for anyone able to duplicate a paranormal feat under mutually agreed upon test conditions).

He is an expert on psychic charlatans, and on the intersection of science, magic, and skepticism.

== Media appearances ==
=== Print ===
Swiss has been featured in The New Yorker, and in Vanity Fair, Los Angeles Times , The Washington Post, and New York Press.

=== TV and radio ===
He was a comedy writer and chief magic consultant for Penn & Teller on their television program, Sin City Spectacular, and he was associate producer for 24 episodes. He also served as head writer and associate director for The Virtual Magician starring Marco Tempest, which aired in 45 countries.

Swiss was featured on NPR discussing the art of teaching and preserving magic.

He has created, produced and performed in the Discovery Channel documentary, Cracking the Con Games. He was featured in the TV show Brain Games (National Geographic) "tricking a group of gamblers."

He has also appeared in television programs including 48 Hours, the PBS series NOVA, the PBS documentary The Art of MagicThe Today Show, and The Late Late Show with Craig Ferguson.

=== Movies and documentaries ===
Swiss was the magic designer for the feature film The Fantasticks among others.

He appeared as a commentator in the documentary Merchants of Doubt, drawing a parallel between his 'honest' lying and the deceitful lying in politics and business. He also appeared as a commentator in the feature-length documentary "An Honest Liar" about fellow magician and skeptic James Randi.
