= Richard Saunders (skeptic) =

Australian-born sceptic and podcaster

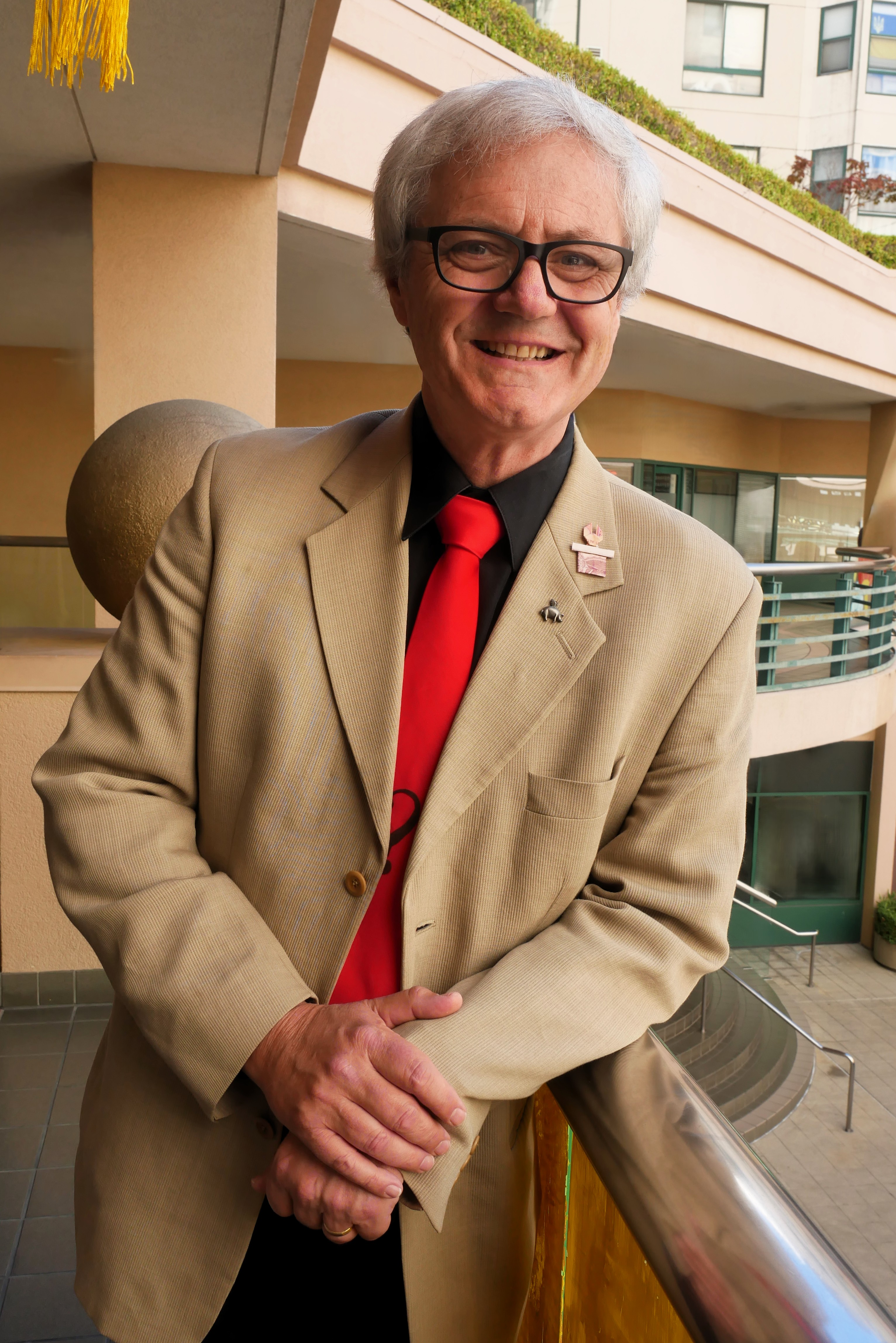
- At New Zealand Skeptics conference in 2016
- Born: Kurri Kurri, New South Wales, Australia
- Known for: Scepticism advocacy
- Website: skepticzone.tv; mysteryinvestigators.com

Richard Saunders Voice
recorded in March 2014

Richard Saunders is an Australian scientific skeptic and podcaster. In 2001, he was awarded a life membership by Australian Skeptics and has twice served as their president. He has presented on skepticism, represented the Australian Skeptics on television and radio shows, and is the co-host of The Skeptic Zone podcast.

== Early life ==
Saunders was born in Kurri Kurri, New South Wales, Australia. His father, R. H. Saunders, a reverend, was posted in Tribune, Saskatchewan, where he lived in 1968 and 1969.

== Professional career ==
=== Web design ===
After graduating from high school, Saunders joined educational publisher Ashton Scholastic and sold educational software for Apple II and Commodore 64 home computers. He also worked as a web designer for The Advance Bank of Australia and Commonwealth Bank.

=== Acting ===
Saunders appeared in the background of Superman Returns and Home and Away.

In 2013, he was invited to be a member of the "World Competition Jury" at Academia Film Olomouc's 48th International Festival of Science Documentary Films or AFO48 in the Czech Republic. He also gave a lecture on the claims of water divining as part of the "Pseudoscience" block and a lecture and workshops on origami as part of the "Beauty of Numbers" block.

=== Professional sceptic ===
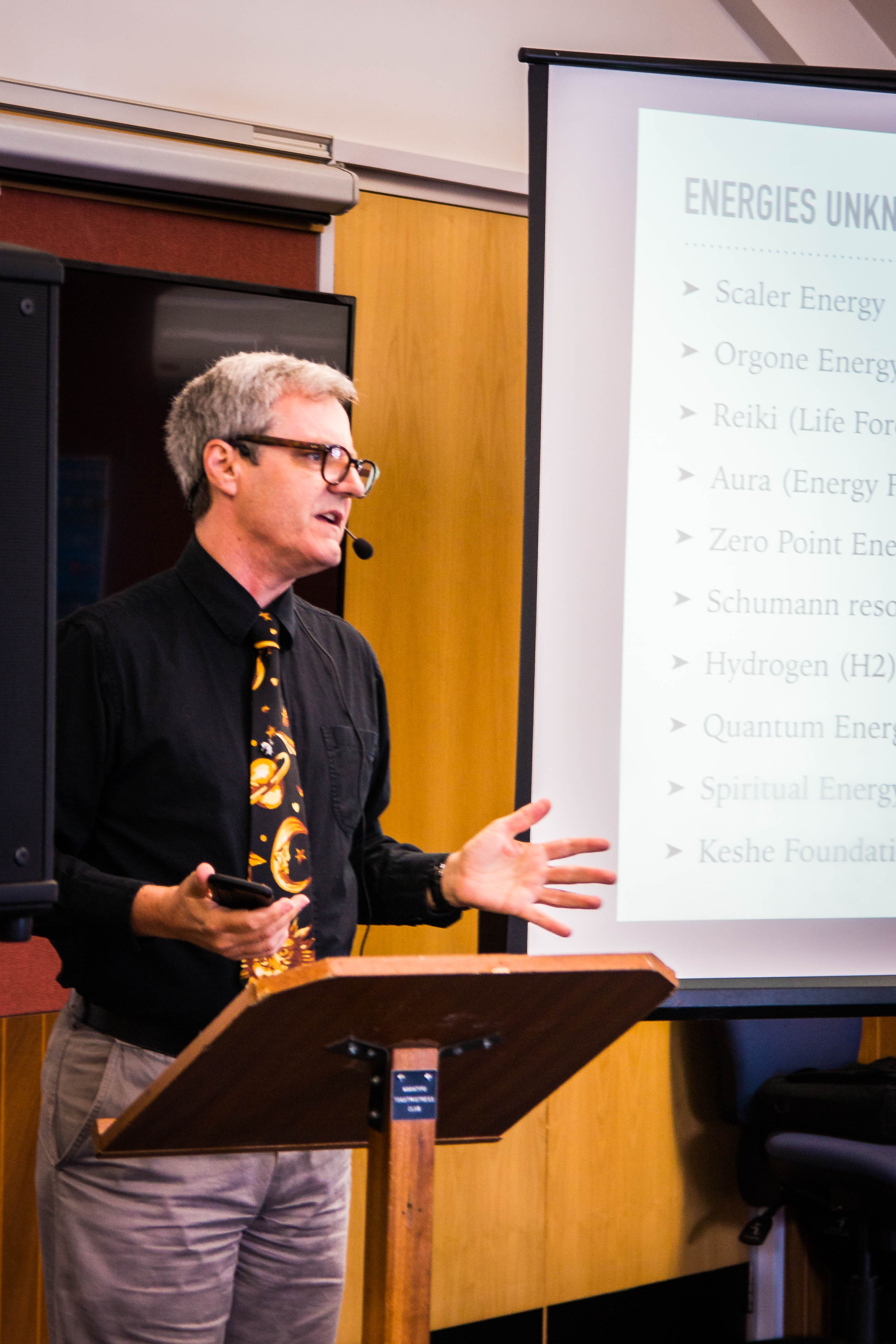
Saunders speaking to the New Zealand Skeptics 2016

As a teenager, he became a scientific skeptic after watching television documentaries on the subject. In 2001, he became a member of the Australian Skeptics committee, later becoming president and vice president of the organisation. He was later awarded a life membership in the organisation and as of 2023 was their Chief Investigator. In 2013, he described himself as an "old school skeptic" interested in the paranormal and consumer protection, but uninvolved in religious debates.

He initiated The Skeptic Tank radio show on Net.FM with Stefan Sojka, produced The Australian Skeptics collection on "Theories of Everything" for TVS local Sydney TV, and created several of the Australians Skeptics convention DVDs. He was the acting artistic director and layout manager for The Skeptic Magazine from Australian Skeptics until Tim Mendham was appointed the new editor in June 2009.

In 2003, Saunders co-founded Mystery Investigators with Alynda Brown and Ian Bryce. The program teaches students to use science and critical thinking to investigate claims of the paranormal, such as water divining, spoon bending, and firewalking.

In December 2009, Saunders conducted an informal double-blind test of the popular Power Balance hologram bracelet on the Australian television program Today Tonight. The results of the test showed evidence that the holograms' effect wasn't different than a placebo. Saunders had previously demonstrated how someone could put together a convincing demonstration to deceive people about the effect of the product. In 2011, Power Balance had to recognize the marketing claims made about the product were not supported by science and paid a large settlement in response to a lawsuit He also penned a letter to Australian pharmacies in March 2009 asking them to take products not backed by medicine off the shelves, such as homeopathic preparations and magnetic pain relief devices.

In 2010 he helped organise the first The Amaz!ng Meeting Australia in Sydney. The meeting featured presentations by several high-profile members of the skeptical community, including James Randi, Brian Dunning, and Eugenie Scott.

==== Public and media appearances ====
Saunders is frequently interviewed by the media as an expert on consumer protection and the paranormal, notably the Australian Broadcasting Corporation and international media.

In 2007 he did a recurring segment for the Mike Williams Saturday Night Live radio program called Myths and Mysteries. In 2011 and 2012 he was a regular on The Dirty Disbelievers, a radio program on the Australian Broadcasting Corporation radio network.

In July and August 2008 (series #1) and in 2011 (series #2), Saunders appeared as the resident sceptic judge on The One, an Australian reality television program on the Seven Network that tested the powers of several alleged psychics.

Saunders produced the Vaccination Chronicles in 2014. The film is a 30-minute documentary collects first-hand anecdotes about the horrors faced by parents of recent generations, whose children died from diseases which are now preventable with vaccines.

==== Podcasting ====
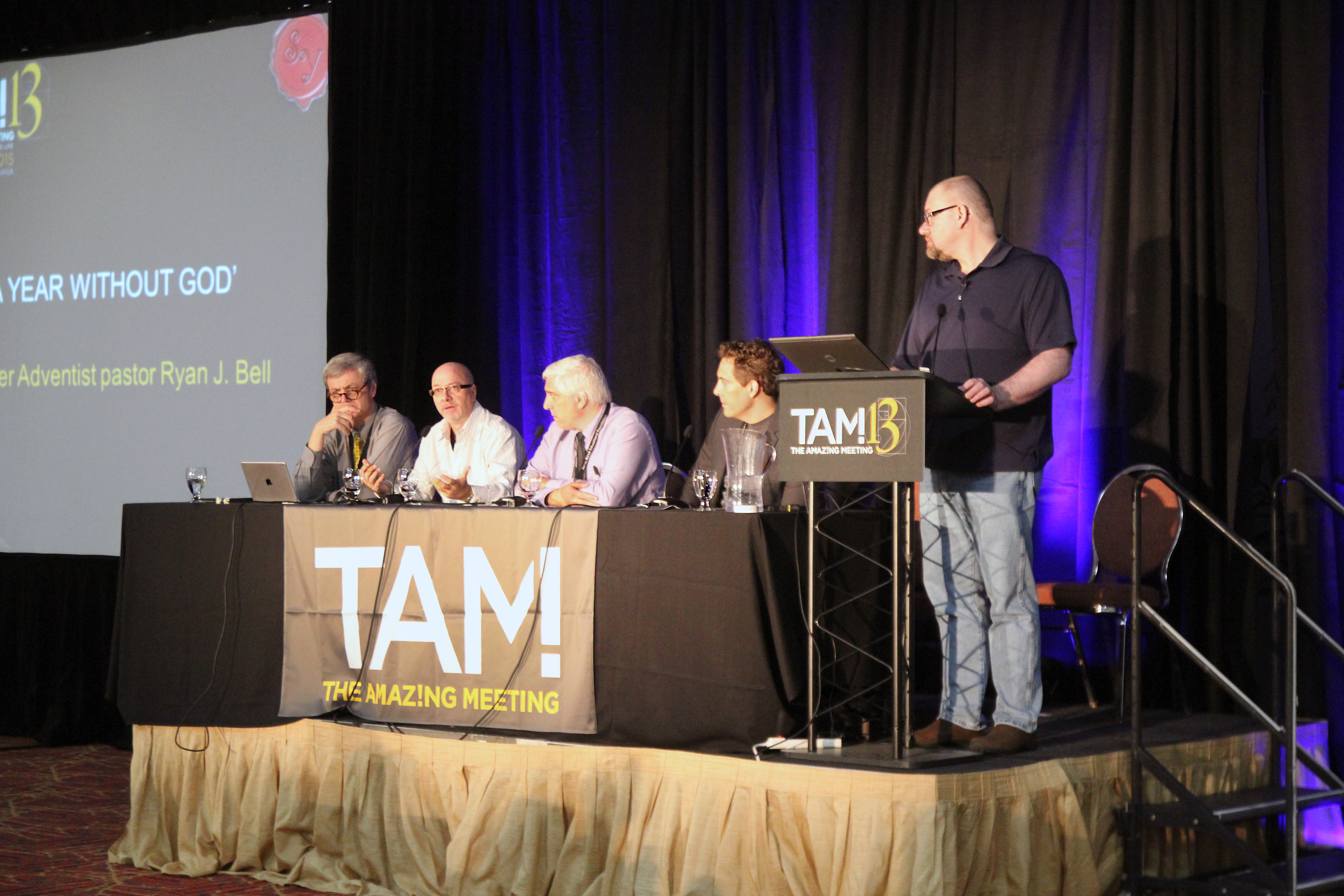
Saunders (left) in 2015, on the Podcaster Panel at TAM13

Saunders was producer and host of The Tank Vodcast (a.k.a. The Skeptic Tank). In 2008 this podcast became The Skeptic Zone podcast, which released its 500th episode on 19 May 2018. It is produced weekly and is billed as "The Podcast from Australia for Science and Reason". Saunders has produced every episode of The Skeptic Zone podcast.

Saunders has also appeared as a guest on many other podcasts and vodcasts including The Skeptics' Guide to the Universe, Skepticality, Dragon*Pod, The Reason Driven Podcast, The Amateur Scientist Podcast, Bad Psychics TV, and Meet The Skeptics!.

==== Great Australian Psychic Prediction Project ====
In 2020 Saunders assembled an international team of skeptics to help him complete a project he had been working on since at least 2018, dubbed the "Great Australian Psychic Prediction Project". As of 2021, the project found psychic predictions to have an 11% success rate, out of 3224 predictions, with approximately 650 yet to be evaluated. In addition to Saunders, the team includes Adrienne Hill, Michelle Bijkersma, Rob Palmer, Leonard Tramiel, Paula Lauterbach, Louis Hillman, Wendy Hughes, Angie Mattke, Kelly Burke and Susan Gerbic.

The project's goal is to collect and determine the accuracy of every psychic prediction published in Australia since 2000. Predictions primarily concern Australia, and the topics include politics, scandals, celebrities, natural disasters, real estate trends, sports, and weather patterns. A minority of predictions concern events outside of Australia. Saunders said that the project "has the opportunity to show us that there are indeed some people who can peer into the future". However, reporting on the interim results for one category, horse racing, Saunders reported that "the overall results are not great for those who claim to see into the future and from what we have gathered so far, I wouldn’t be placing any bets based on their mystical advice."

== Awards and honours ==
- 2001 Made "Life Member" of Australian Skeptics
- 2011 Made CSI Fellow (Committee for Skeptical Inquiry)
- 2024 Awarded the Lifetime Achievement Award by Australian Skeptics

== List of publications ==
- Saunders, Richard; Morris, Campbell; Mackness, Brian (1988). Aussiegami : paperfolding Down Under – just for fun. Melbourne: Lothian Publishing.
- Saunders, Richard; Mackness, Brian (1989). Prehistoric Aussiegami : paperfolding Down Under dinosaurs ... for fun. Melbourne: Lothian Publishing.
- Saunders, Richard; Mackness, Brian (1990). Horrorgami: Spooky Paperfolding Just for Fun. Port Melbourne, Victoria, Australia: Lothian Publishing Co. ISBN 0-85091-380-2.
- Mackness, Brian; Saunders, Richard; Saunders, Geoff (1990). Food Tricks. Crows Nest, NSW, Australia: Barnacle Publishing. ISBN 1-86338-013-2.
- Mackness, Brian; Saunders, Richard; Saunders, Geoff (1990). Paper Tricks. Crows Nest, NSW, Australia: Barnacle Publishing. ISBN 1-86338-009-4.
- Saunders, Richard; Mackness, Brian (1990). Boats. Crows Nest, NSW, Australia: Barnacle Publishing. ISBN 1-86338-002-7.
- Saunders, Richard; Mackness, Brian (1990). Decorations. Crows Nest, NSW, Australia: Barnacle Publishing. ISBN 1-86338-008-6.
- Saunders, Richard; Mackness, Brian (1990). Games. Crows Nest, NSW, Australia: Barnacle Publishing. ISBN 1-86338-001-9.
- Saunders, Richard; Mackness, Brian (1990). Hats. Crows Nest, NSW, Australia: Barnacle Publishing. ISBN 1-86338-006-X.
- Saunders, Richard; Mackness, Brian (1990). Masks. Crows Nest, NSW, Australia: Barnacle Publishing. ISBN 1-86338-005-1.
- Saunders, Richard; Mackness, Brian (1990). Planes. Crows Nest, NSW, Australia: Barnacle Publishing. ISBN 1-86338-007-8.
- Saunders, Richard; Mackness, Brian (1990). Toys. Crows Nest, NSW, Australia: Barnacle Publishing. ISBN 1-86338-003-5.
- Saunders, Richard; Roche, Brad (1992). The Eyespy Book of Boredom Busters. Sydney, Australia: Ashton Scholastic. ISBN 0-86896-882-X.
- Saunders, Richard; Davis, Michael (1992). The Eyespy Book of Dinosaur Data. Sydney, Australia: Ashton Scholastic. ISBN 0-86896-887-0.
- Saunders, Richard; Davis, Michael (1992). The Eyespy Book of Aussie Action. Sydney, Australia: Ashton Scholastic. ISBN 0-86896-884-6.
- Saunders, Richard; Somers, Greg (1992). The Eyespy Book of Magic Tricks. Sydney, Australia: Ashton Scholastic. ISBN 0-86896-886-2.
- Saunders, Richard; Davis, Michael (1992). Lucky's Favourite Jokes. Sydney, Australia: Ashton Scholastic. ISBN 0-86896-897-8.
- Saunders, Richard; Spoor, Mike (1992). The Eyespy Book of Animal Disguises. Sydney, Australia: Ashton Scholastic. ISBN 0-86896-881-1.
- Saunders, Richard; Martin, John (1992). The Eyespy Book of Christmas Gifts to Make. Sydney, Australia: Ashton Scholastic. ISBN 0-86896-888-9.
- Saunders, Richard (1992). Animals. Roseville, NSW, Australia: Lineup. ISBN 0-646-09445-9.
- Saunders, Richard (1992). Decorations for All Occasions. Roseville, NSW, Australia: Lineup. ISBN 0-646-09446-7.
- Saunders, Geoff; Saunders, Richard (1992). Surfing. Roseville, NSW, Australia: Lineup. ISBN 0-646-10193-5.
- Saunders, Geoff; Saunders, Richard; Gamble, Kim (1992). Tennis. Roseville, NSW, Australia: Lineup. ISBN 0-646-10192-7.
- Alabaster, Jo; Saunders, Richard; Bowditch, Peter; Mendham, Tim (December 2014). "Is anyone there?" (PDF). The Skeptic. 34 (4). Australian Skeptics: 10–14. Review of the Australian Paranormal & Spiritual Expo, Oct 2014.
- Bowditch, Peter; Saunders, Richard; Mendham, Tim (December 2014). "Fair's fare : purchasing the paranormal" (PDF). The Skeptic. 34 (4). Australian Skeptics: 15–16. Review of the Australian Paranormal & Spiritual Expo, Oct 2014.
