= Orak Island (Çanakkale) =

Island in Turkey

Native name: Orak Adası
- Location within Turkey

Geography
- Coordinates: 39°55′07″N 26°04′25″E

Administration
- Turkey
- İl (province): Çanakkale Province
- İlçe: Ezine

Orak Island, known in Greek as Drepano (Δρέπανο), is an uninhabited Aegean island in Turkey. Its ancient name was Drepano. It is a part of Tavşan Islands. The island is at 39°55′07″N 26°04′25″E. Administratively it is in Ezine ilçe (district) of Çanakkale Province. Its distance to the Anatolian coast is 6.5 kilometres (4.0 mi), to Bozcaada is 9.2 kilometres (5.7 mi) and to Çanakkale is 38 kilometres (24 mi).
