= Orak Island (Muğla) =

Island in Turkey

Native name: Orak Adası
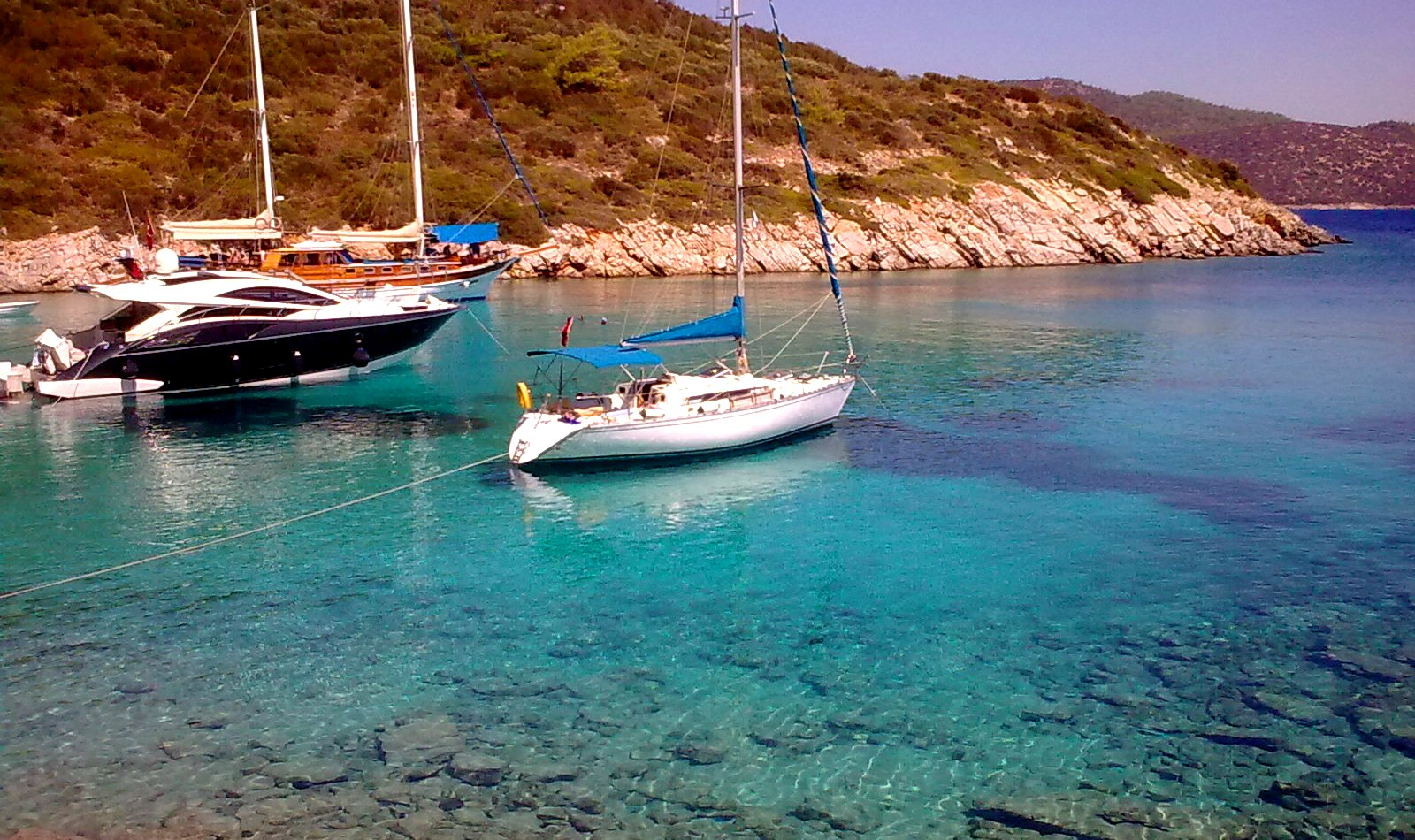

- Location within Turkey

Geography
- Coordinates: 36°58′22″N 27°35′54″E

Administration
- Turkey
- İl (province): Muğla Province
- İlçe: Bodrum

Orak Island is an Aegean island in Turkey.

The island is in Gökova Gulf at 36°58′22″N 27°35′54″E.The longer dimension of the island (north to east direction) is 1,800 metres (5,900 ft). There is a light house on the island. It is a part of Bodrum ilçe (district) of Muğla Province. There are olive grooves on the uninhabited island. The cape at the south coast is known as an ideal place for underwater sports.
