= Northeast Conference on Science and Skepticism =

Annual conference in New York City

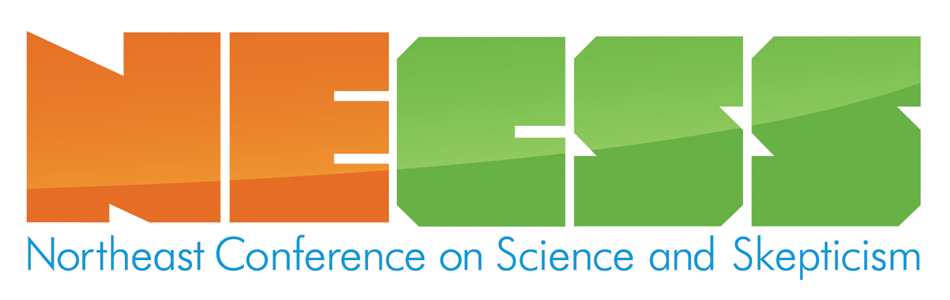
- Status: Inactive
- Genre: Science and skepticism
- Location: New York City
- Country: United States
- Inaugurated: 2009
- Attendance: ~500
- Organizer: New York City Skeptics, New England Skeptical Society & Society for Science-Based Medicine
- Website: NECSS.org

The Northeast Conference on Science and Skepticism (NECSS, pronounced as "nexus") was a four-day conference focusing on science and skepticism founded in 2009 and held annually in New York City until 2022. NECSS is jointly run by the New York City Skeptics (NYCS) and the New England Skeptical Society (NESS). The Society for Science-Based Medicine joined as a full sponsor of the conference in 2015. As of 2016, attendance was estimated at approximately 500 people.

== Beginnings ==
The New York City Skeptics wanted to have a skeptical conference and invited magician James Randi to speak at their one-year anniversary. After the lecture attracted over 400 attendees, the group determined that there would be enough interest to hold a scientific skepticism conference in the area. The NYCS and NESS organizations discussed combining to form NECSS. The conference started in 2009 as a one-day event, with popular science writer Carl Zimmer as the keynote speaker. The conference expanded to include Skeptics in the Pub events, fundraising dinners, separately ticketed workshops and live-podcast recordings.

According to Steven Novella and Evan Bernstein, the NESS was asked to speak for the New York City Skeptics, September 12, 2009. The resulting lecture was a tribute to colleague Perry DeAngelis (died 2007), held near the August anniversary of his birth and death. NECSS organizers moved the conference to April and the SGU cast continued the tradition of celebrating DeAngelis's life each year at NECSS.

New York City Skeptic's co-founder Jamy Ian Swiss wrote that the conference was created to address a need for a regional skeptic conference in the Northeast. The first evening in 2009 sold out with 400 attendees, with Swiss stating that organizers turned people away.

We have always conceived of NECSS as a broad-based conference with room for everyone who is interested in skepticism, science and critical thought. And I think our content has reflected that. We have had content that is... science, "bigfoot skepticism", religion, women's issues... We have had a broad range of topics addressed and we are going to try to keep doing that. It's in our conference's name, 'science and skepticism'. So it is something we are very much aware of, it is a skeptics' conference, but it is very much also a science conference.

— Michael Feldman

According to co-organizer Michael Feldman, the conference regularly attracts about 400 attendees. They want to continue to grow, but not to sacrifice quality with the conference experience. Feldman stated that about half of the conference attendees are from the tri-state area, (New York, New Jersey and Connecticut) and the remaining 40–50% come from farther afield. The 2016 conference attracted people from ten countries and thirty states.

The 2015 conference organizing committee was made up of Steven Novella, Jay Novella, Michael Feldman, Jamy Ian Swiss, Benny Pollak, Spiro Condos, Mark Crislip, Heather Berlin, Deborah Berebichez and Brian Wecht. Others that have become involved in the conference are Massimo Pigliucci and Julia Galef.

== Highlights ==
Emcee musician George Hrab outdrew the science-based medicine seminar in April 2015 with almost 500 attendees. His "hybrid musical act/quiz show, A Skeptical Extravaganza of Special Significance" pitted the SGU team and Bill Nye against each other with mock debates over "the Millennium Falcon vs the starship Enterprise ... and the American system of units ... [vs] the metric system. Hrab also managed to add in "rounds of Pictionary about Area 51 and water fluoridation."

"Stimulus/Response" conceived by George Hrab and Brian Wecht was a three-act performance held on Friday night, and was separately ticketed from the conference. It was a night of discussion, performances and an improv comedy group. This group roasted Jay Novella in 2013, brother Steve wrote "it was hilarious" so in 2014 Jay made sure that Steve was next.

Bad Astronomer Phil Plait and musician George Hrab performed a song Hrab wrote called Death From the Skies based on Plaits book by the same name. This performance has Harb playing guitar and signing "This is the way the world will end" with Plait speaking statistics about the likelihood of various astronomical deaths, such as meteors, super-novas and solar flairs.

Doubtful News creator Sharon Hill compared the 2009 conference to the 2011 one. She felt that things were improving, great speakers and wonderful meeting new people. She bemoans that it would cost less for the attendees if held outside New York City, but understands that for many people, this is a more convenient location. She also wishes that there were more quiet areas to allow for more socializing with old and new friends. In 2009 when Hill was attending the very first NECSS she mentions that the theme of the conference was very relative to her own current college degree work in Science & the Public. She says "the overarching theme was science portrayed to the public – how the media delivers a message, how even scientists screw up and take missteps, how we can get better."

Magician and author Richard Wiseman performing at the 2009 conference explained in answer to a question by an attendee, people believe in the paranormal for many reasons, they might need to believe and it's possible that they have had "personal experiences" that convinced them. '"It is not clear to me that by robbing people of their beliefs, we always make the world a better place."'

According to James Randi, "I recently appeared at the annual NECSS – Northeast Conference on Science and Skepticism – in New York (think of it as a superb mini-version of our annual The Amaz!ng Meeting in Las Vegas), and was asked to speak on the faith-healing racket. As I walked on stage, I switched from my original intention, and decided to handle a specific example of the subject that I find very difficult to address, an example of the faith-healers' perfidy and cruelty that I'd previously only mentioned in the introduction to The Faith Healers."

When interviewed about the New York City Skeptics, Julia Galef responded, "I think a lot of people felt the same way as you did, Karl – there seemed to be a lot of pent-up demand for an organization devoted specifically to science and reason, not just secularism. In terms of our success, I have to give a lot of credit to our president, Michael Feldman. He's a fantastic organizer, and the kind of person who really makes sure things get done. We've also got a dedicated team of volunteers, the Gotham Skeptic blog, and of course our annual Northeast Conference on Science and Skepticism (NECSS), which sold out two years in a row and drew people from all over the U.S. and several other countries."

The special "Evening with James Randi" event at the ninth annual NECSS in 2017 was open to the public and is estimated to have drawn a crowd of over 600. Randi performed an escape and took an "overdose" of a Homeopathic remedy to demonstrate that it had no actual effect. The focus of his talk was on educating the younger generation. The first day of the 2017 conference had to be relocated at the last minute due to an earlier fire at the Fashion Institute of Technology. Cohost of Star Talk podcast, Leighann Lord emceed.

2018 was the tenth year. The keynote speaker was Jennifer Ouellette. Katie Mack and Raychelle Burks were part of a NECSS 2018 speakers explored the topic of sexual misconduct in the skeptics community in a panel named "SciComm Meets 'Me Too'". There was a full day of Science-Based Medicine. Talks included David Gorski on the hype of stem cell treatments, Harriet Hall on the dangers of cancer vaccine "manufactroversies", Clay Jones and Grant Ritchey on quack Tourette syndrome remedies, and Michael Marshall discussing his strategies with the Good Thinking Society that helped (almost completely) eliminate public medical funding for homeopathy in the United Kingdom. "With a blending of new paths, old traditions, and new traditions, NECSS has taken its first steps in blazing a different trail in the future of skepticism".

The eleventh NECSS in 2019 featured keynote speaker Carl Zimmer with a talk called "Heredity: Its Powers, Perversions, and Potential", in which he spoke about the potential consequences of home genetic tests without guidance from medical professionals. Brian Wecht, Jay Novella, and Steven Novella explored how skeptical and scientific characters are portrayed in media in an interactive workshop called "How Science and Skepticism are Portrayed in Pop Culture". Other workshops include "Psychology of Magic" with mentalist Eric Walton and "Shaping Your Child's Behavior with Science" with Jocelyn Novella and Liz Gaston. Cara Santa Maria and Mary Roach sat down for a conversation about Roach's body of work, including her books Stiff, Spook, and Packing for Mars. Some of the talks dealt with social issues such as racial bias and atheism in the black community. Odaelys Walwyn's talk explored the lack of STEM career accessibility to the black community and Debbie Goddard spoke about reaching out to those in the black community who may be questioning their faith. The "Skeptical Extravaganza of Special Significance" was also a feature of NECSS 2019.

=== Dawkins controversy ===
In early 2016, the NECSS dis-invited the prominent evolutionary biologist Richard Dawkins from speaking due to a tweet Dawkins had made in the weeks prior which drew parallels between extremist Islamists and extremist feminists. Many free speech advocates such as Sam Harris criticised the NECSS decision, labelling them "fools". In a press release, the NECSS defended the decision, stating "We believe strongly in freedom of speech and freedom to express unpopular, and even offensive, views. However, unnecessarily divisive, counterproductive, and even hateful speech runs contrary to our mission and the environment we wish to foster at NECSS."

After much criticism, the NECSS apologized to Dawkins, admitted their dis-invitation was "not professional" and re-invited him, stating, "There is room for a range of reasonable opinions on these issues and our conversation will reflect that diversity." Dawkins was unable to accept the re-invitation, as he had suffered a stroke in the interim. At NECSS 2016 a panel was designed to address what had happened with Dawkins. This panel was moderated by Jennifer Lopez from the Center for the Advancement of Science in Space. Also on the panel were Heather Berlin, Will Creele, Julia Galef, John McWhorter and Yvette d'Entremont. The panel was titled "Free Speech, Social Justice, and Political Correctness." According to journalist Russ Dobler, the panel came to "common ground" by agreeing that unless the person you are talking to is "completely unreasonable, we should seek out and talk to the people we disagree with most."

== Summary of past conferences ==
Dates	Speakers	Location	Notes
September 12, 2009	Richard Wiseman, George Hrab, James Randi (recorded message), Jamy Ian Swiss, Carl Zimmer, John Rennie, Rachel Dunlop, Paul Offit, Howard Schneider, Michael De Dora, Massimo Pigliucci, Kaja Perina, John Snyder	Held at the French Institute, Manhattan Campus, New York	Keynote: Carl Zimmer – All Aboard the Science-Media Express!
April 17, 2010	David Gorski, Jamy Ian Swiss, PZ Meyers, George Hrab, John Rennie, James Randi, D.J. Grothe, Julia Galef, Kimball Atwood, Steve Mirsky, John Snyder	Held at the French Institute, New York	Keynote: DJ Grothe – Skepticism is a Humanism
April 9–10, 2011	Brian Dunning, Jamy Ian Swiss, Jacob Appel, Susan Jacoby, Phil Plait, John Allen Paulos, Brooke Allen, Hai-Ting Chinn, Todd Robbins, Dan Gardner, Jennifer Michael Hecht, Steve Mirsky, Michael De Dora, Massimo Pigliucci, Julia Galef, Carl Zimmer, John Rennie, Eliezer Yudkowsky, Sadie Crabtree, Kendrick Frazier, Eugenie Scott	Baruch College (CUNY), New York	Keynote: Phil Plait The Final Epsilon
April 21–22, 2012	James Randi, Hai-Ting Chinn, George Hrab, Seth Shostak, J. Scott Armstrong, John Bohannon, Jamy Ian Swiss, PZ Meyers, Joe Nickell, Ethan Brown, Deborah Berebichez, David Kyle Johnson, Massimo Pigliucci, Michael Rogers, Meghan Groome, Marc Barnhill, Deborah Feldman, Kevin Slavin, Julia Galef	Held at the French Institute, Manhattan Campus, New York	Keynote: James Randi – Surviving the Quacks!
April 5–7, 2013	Leonard Mlodinow, Bob Blaskiewicz, Sharon Hill, Hai-Ting Chinn, Mariette DiChristina, Karen Strachan, Brian Wecht, Simon Singh, Natalie Molina Niño, Cat Bohannon, Michael Shermer, Massimo Pigliucci, Jamy Ian Swiss, Deborah Berebichez, Julia Galef, Syd LeRoy, Jim Holt, George Hrab	Held at the Fashion Institute of Technology, New York	Keynote: Leonard Mlodinow – Subliminal: How Your Unconscious Mind Influences Your Behavior
April 11–13, 2014	Lawrence Krauss, Massimo Pigliucci, Jamy Ian Swiss, Deborah Berebichez, Julia Galef, George Hrab, Paul Offit, Cady Coleman, Elise Andrew, Sally Satel, Alison Gopnik, Angie McAllister, Heather Berlin, Jeanne Garbarino, Oliver Medvedik, Brian Wecht, Hai-ting Chinn	Held at the Fashion Institute of Technology, Manhattan Campus, New York	Keynote: Lawrence Krauss – The Secret Life of Physicists
April 9–12, 2015	Massimo Pigliucci, John Rennie, Jamy Ian Swiss, Deborah Berebichez, Julia Galef, George Hrab, Heather Berlin, Brian Wecht, David Gorski, Jann Bellamy, Mark Crislip, Harriet Hall, W. Ann Reynolds, Marty Klein, Mark Siddall, Jeanne Garbarino, Simona Giunta, Latasha Wright, Stephen Hall, Rachel Meyer, Yelena Bernardskaya, Allan Adams, Laura Helmuth, Linda Curtis-Bey, Marc Randazza, Maria Konnikova, Mark Weckel, Sabriya Stukes, Simona Giunta and Steven S. Hall	Fashion Institute of Technology New York	Keynote: Bill Nye
May 12–15, 2016	Julia Galef, George Hrab, Michael E. Mann, Harriet Hall, Baba Brinkman, Jamy Ian Swiss, Brian Wecht, Bill Nye, John McWhorter, Jennifer Lopez, Heather Berlin, Will Creeley, Yvette d'Entremont, John Horgan, Jay Novella, Neer Asherie, Deborah Berebichez, Shari Berkowitz, Hai-Ting Chinn, Jann Bellamy, Scott Gavura, Saul Hymes, Evan Bernstein, John Snyder, Cara Santa Maria, Grant Ritchey, Clay Jones, Steven Novella, Steve Lundquist, Hussein Jirdeh, Maria Konnikova, Jacob Appel	Fashion Institute of Technology New York	Keynote: Richard Wiseman
June 29 – July 2, 2017	James Randi, Leighann Lord, Gavin Schmidt, Britt Marie Hermes, Summer Ash, Richard Sanders, Julia Galef, Cara Santa Maria, Massimo Pigliucci, Nina Burleigh, Steve Novella, Helaine Olen, Jay Novella, Jennifer Lopez, George Hrab, Brian Wecht, John Rennie, David Gorski, Harriet Hall, Clay Jones, Brooke Binkowski, Robyn Stein DeLuca, Spiro Condos, Yelena Bernadskaya, Steve Lundquist, Evan Bernstein, Bob Novella, Niki Athanasiadou	Fashion Institute of Technology New York	Keynote: Michael J. Massimino
July 12–15, 2018	Leighann Lord, Steven Novella, Clay Jones, Grand Ritchey, Harriet Hall, David Gorski, Michael Marshall, Emma Jones, Jay Novella, Natalia Reagan, Mike Miscione, Judith Danovitch, Amanda Marcotte, Shaughnessy Naughton, Brian Wecht, Raychelle Burkes, Kyle Marian, Heather Berlin, Valerie Horsley, Elaine DiMasi, Hai Ting, Matt Schickele, Olivia Koski, Cara Santa Maria, Evan Burnstein, Bill Nye, Katie Mack, Jennifer Ouellette	Fashion Institute of Technology New York	Keynote: Jennifer Ouellette
July 11–15, 2019	Eric Walton, Andrea Jones-Rooy, Steven Novella, George Hrab, Jay Novella, Brian Wecht, Spiro Condos, Liz Gaston, Jocelyn Novella, Bob Novella, Evan Bernstein, Cara Santa Maria, David Gorski, Odaelys Walwyn, Clay Jones, Paul Offit, Debbie Goddard, Mary Roach, Randi Hutter Epstein, Russ Dobler, Yelena Bernadskaya, Nathan Lents, Aaron Rabinowitz, Neville Sanjana, Matthew Liao, Brant Macduff	Fashion Institute of Technology New York	Keynote: Carl Zimmer
July 31 – August 1, 2020	Ann Druyan, Scott E. Page, Siouxsie Wiles, Richard Wiseman, Bill Nye, David Hu, Leighann Lord, Andrea Jones-Rooy, Steven Novella, Shane Campbell-Staton, Cara Santa Maria, George Hrab, Jay Novella, Brian Wecht, Birds over Arkansas, Bob Novella, Slau, Joey Fabian, Scott Haskitt, Jocelyn Novella, Janice Kessler, Ernestine Briggs-King, Milton Mermikides	Digital live stream	1,500 registered
2021	TBD	Atlantic City	
August 5 – 6, 2022	David Copperfield, Bill Nye, Adam Berinsky, Richard Wiseman, Jennifer Pan, Christie Aschwanden, Andrea Jones-Rooy, Ilyse Hogue, Steven Novella, Kasha Patel		

== Gallery ==
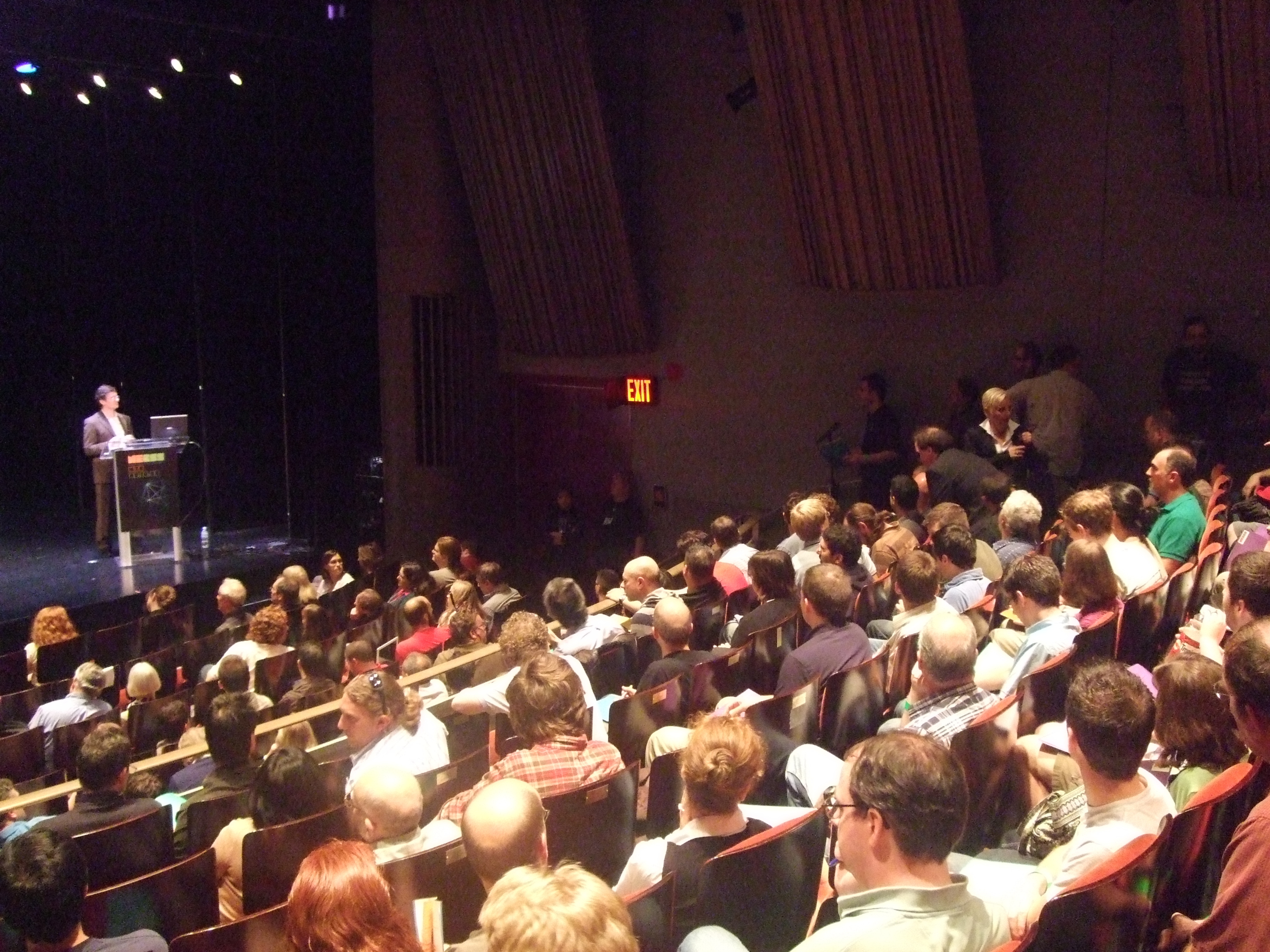
Questions from audience 2009

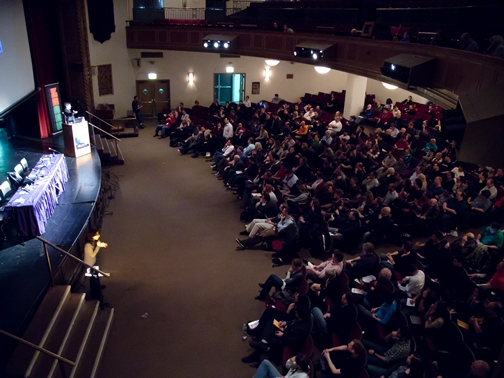
Audience From 2011 at Baruch College (CUNY)

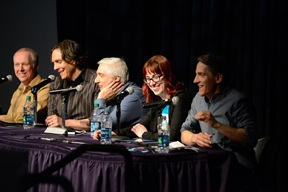
SGU Panel – 2013

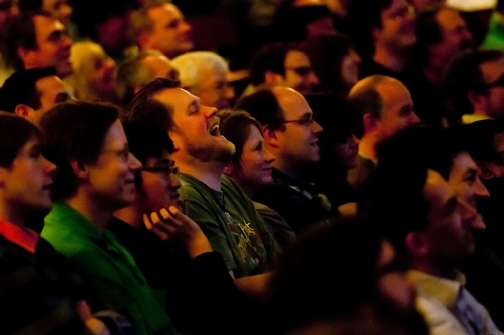
Audience From 2011 at Baruch College (CUNY)

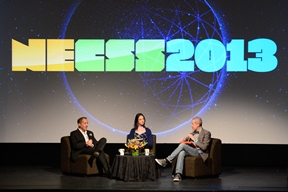
Rationally Speaking Podcast live recording with Michael Shermer, Julia Galef and Massimo Pigliucci – 2013

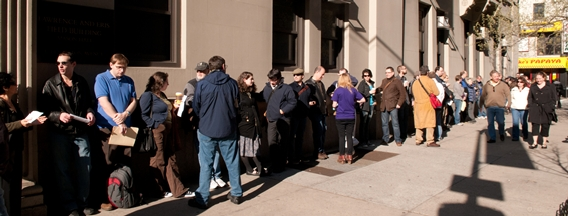
Lining up outside the venue – 2011

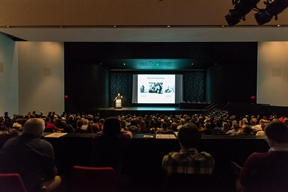
Audience view of stage – 2013

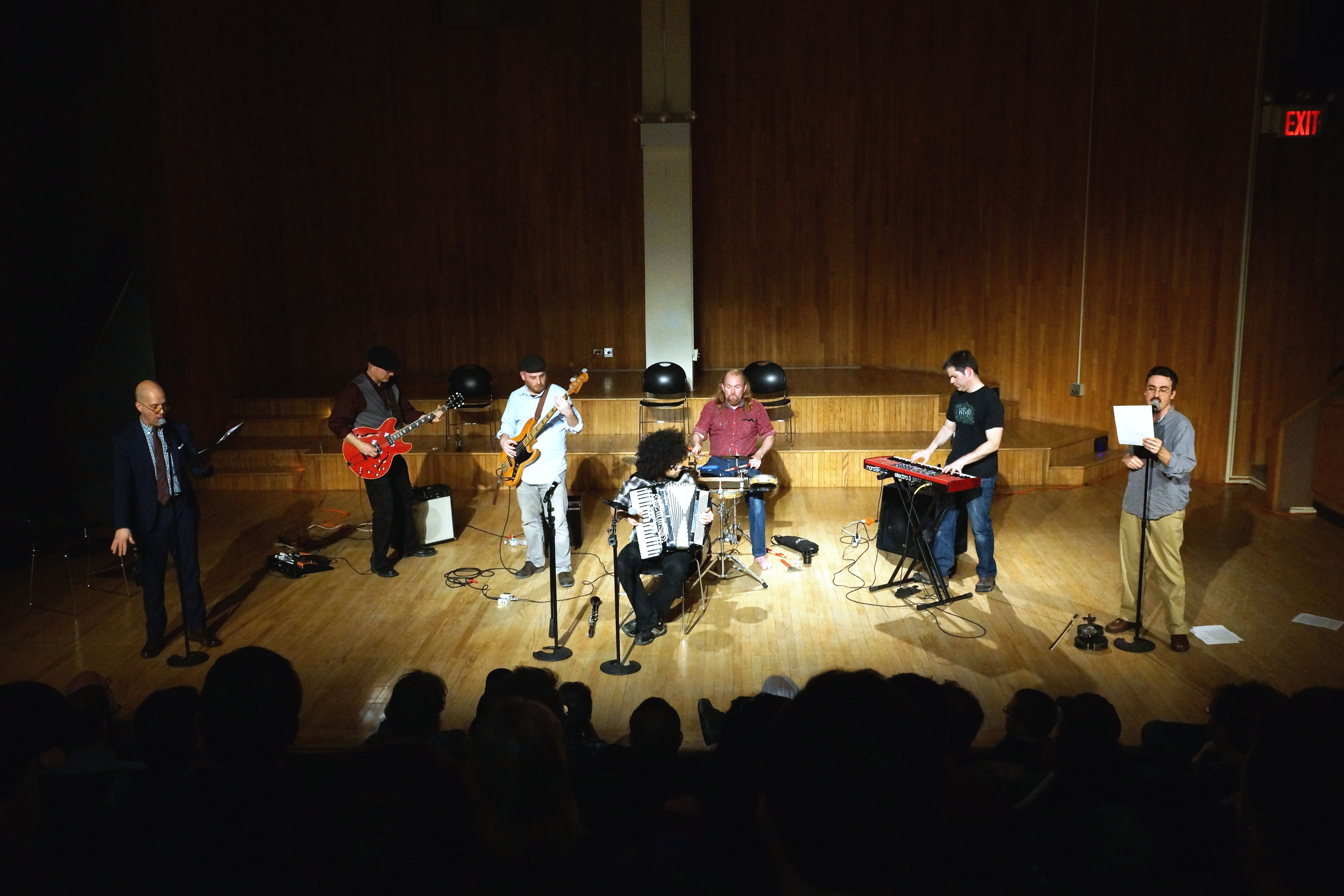
Stimulus Response – 2014

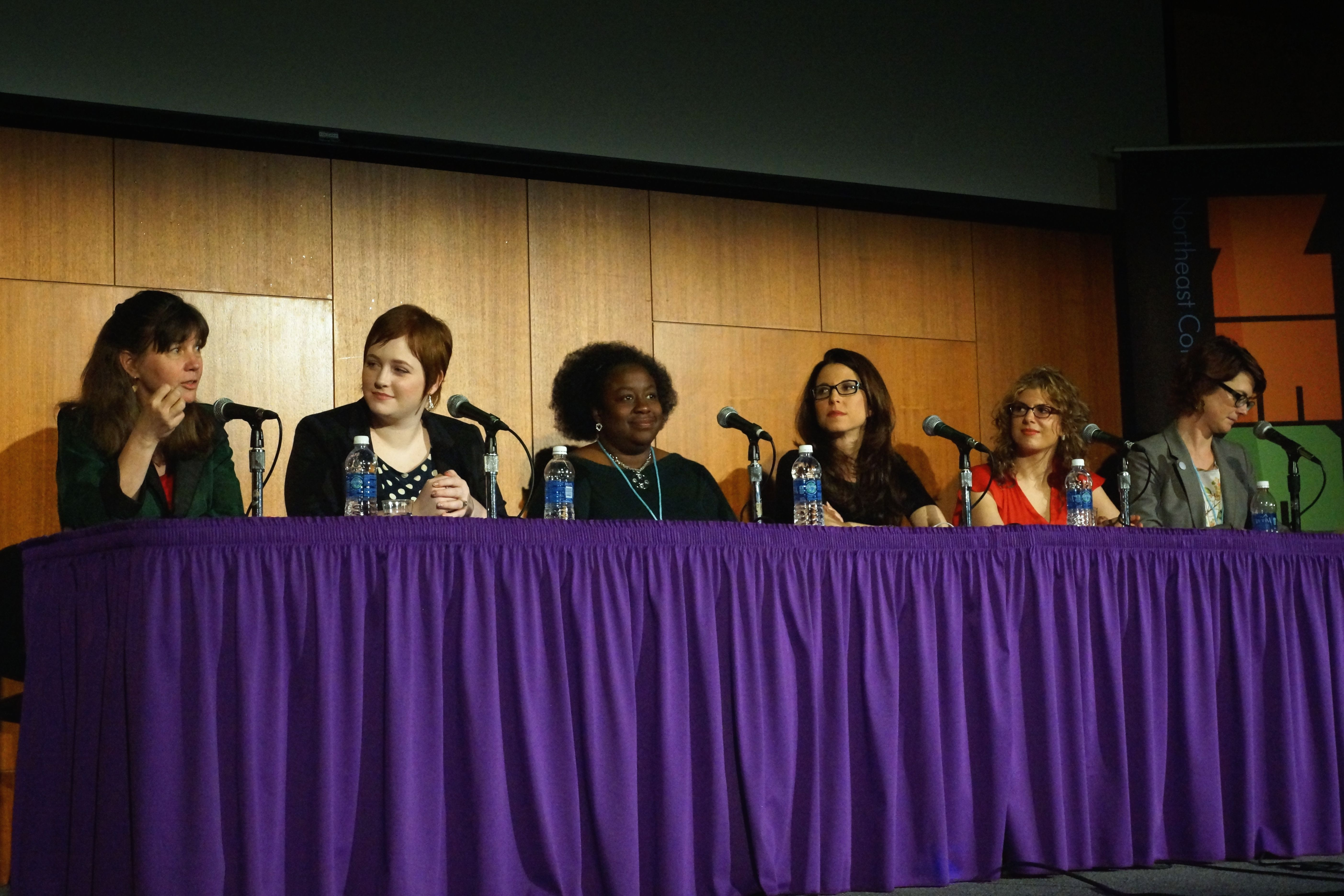
The Si02 Panel with Jeanne Garbarino, Cady Coleman, Elise Andrew, Latasha Wright, Heather Berlin, Deborah Berebichez – 2014

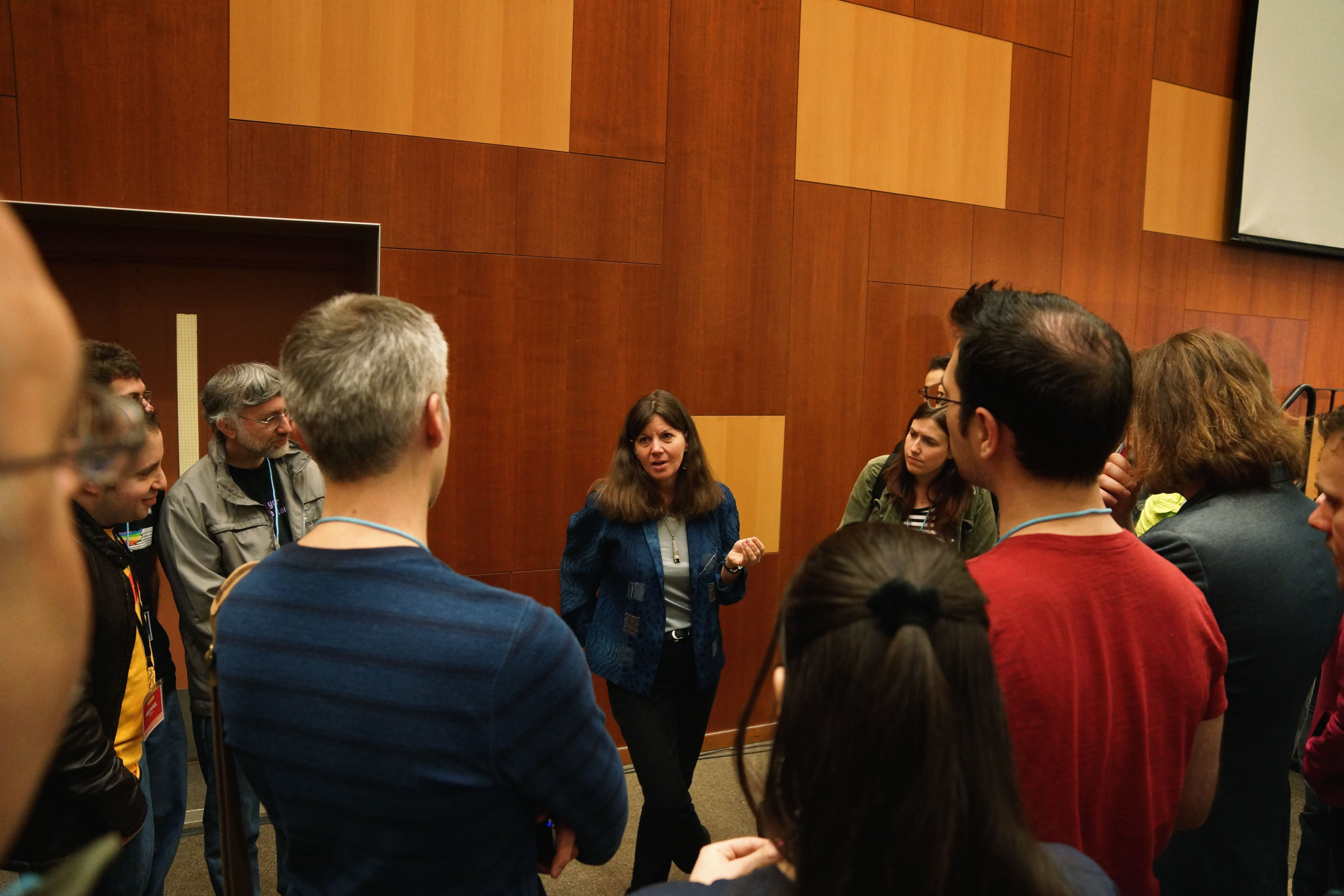
Astronaut Cady Coleman – 2014

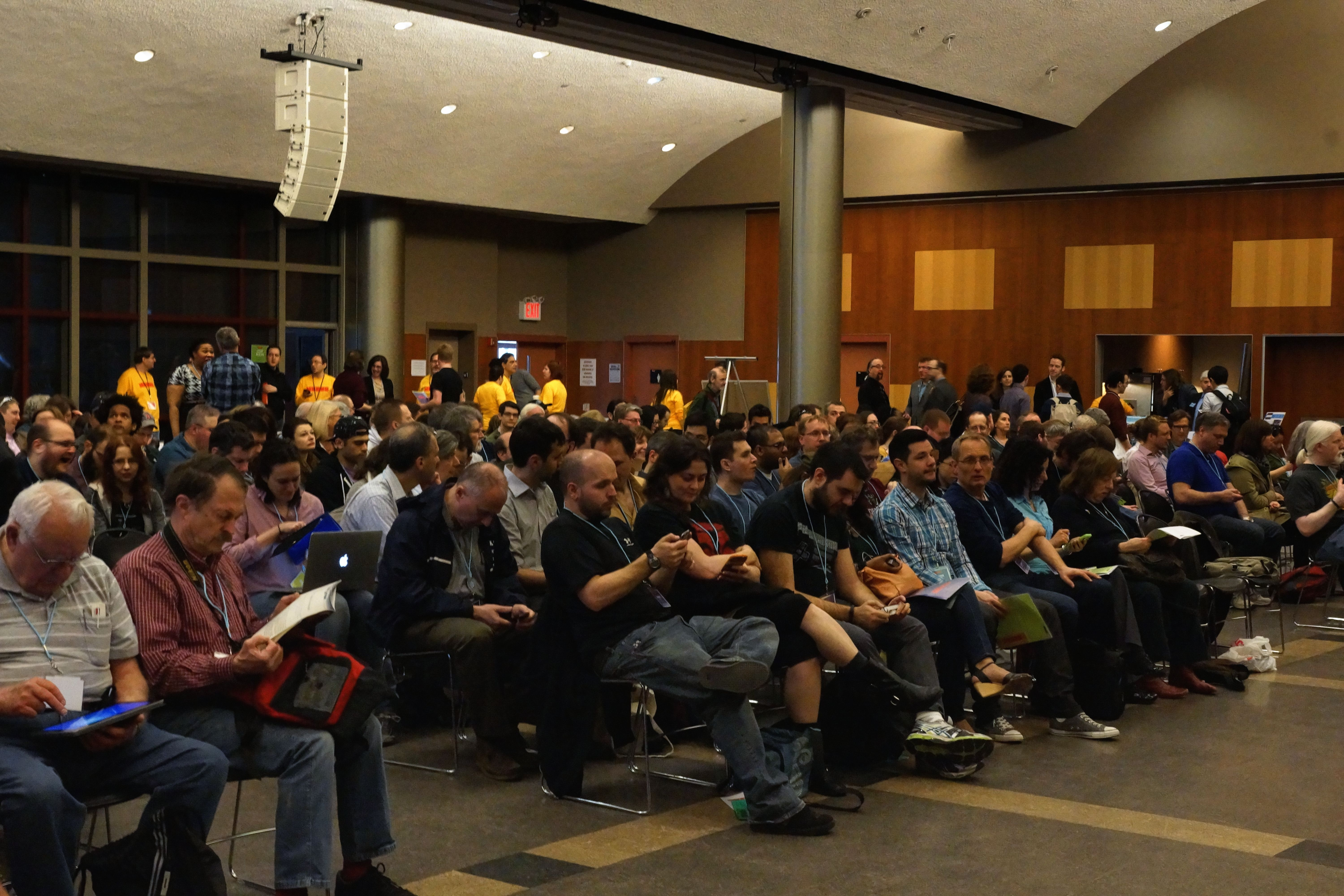
Audience 2014

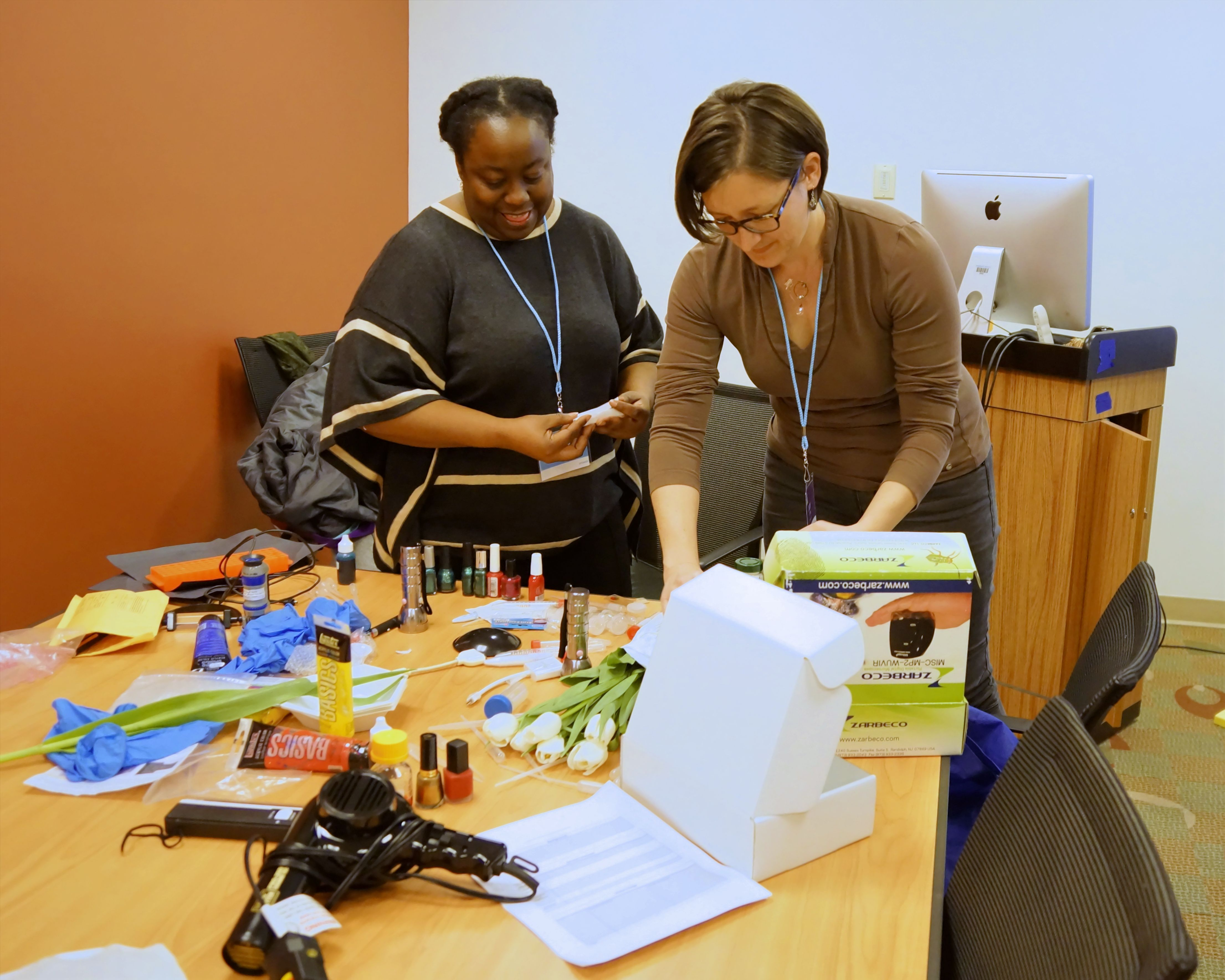
Science Using the Hand-Held Microscope Workshop featuring Latasha Wright of The BioBus – 2015
