= BHC =

BHC can refer to:

- Balochistan High Court, a high court in Quetta, Balochistan, Pakistan
- Bank holding company, company with significant ownership of one or more banks
- Barron Hilton Cup, a glider competition
- Beaconhills College, a school in Victoria, Australia
- Beating Heart Cadaver, a human body that, after having been declared brain-dead, is attached to a medical ventilator in order to preserve organs for organ transplantation
- Benign hereditary chorea, a neurological disorder
- Benzenehexachloride, different chemicals
- Bergischer HC, a German team handball club
- British high commission
- Beverly Hills Cop (film series), a movie franchise starring Eddie Murphy
- Beverly Hills Chihuahua
- BHC Communications, a broadcast holding company, held by Chris-Craft Industries
- British Home Championship, an annual football competition in the United Kingdom
- British Honduras Constabulary, a former police force in Belize
- British Hovercraft Corporation, a former hovercraft manufacturer of the United Kingdom
- Business History Conference, an organization that focuses on business history and the environment in which businesses operate
