= Frank Lipman =

Celebrity doctor and acupuncturist

- Born: 1954 (age 71–72)
- Occupation: Acupuncturist

Frank Lipman (born 1954) is a South African celebrity doctor, acupuncturist and alternative medicine advocate who resides in New York. He is a promoter of functional medicine.

== Biography ==
Lipman took interest in herbal medicine and homeopathy whilst in Africa and started to practice acupuncture during his residency in the South Bronx in the United States. In 1987, he obtained his New York acupuncture license and in 1992 set up his own clinic on Fifth Avenue the Eleven Eleven Wellness Center. He says he took up acupuncture because he became disillusioned with American medicine. He practices integrative medicine. Recently he practices what he calls "Good Medicine" a mixture of western and alternative medicine. His clients have included Maggie Gyllenhaal, Donna Karan and Gwyneth Paltrow. He writes articles for Paltrow's Goop website. Lipman is Chief Medical Officer for The Well in New York City.

Lipman has been criticized for making arguments against swine flu vaccination. Peter Lipson of Science-Based Medicine wrote that Lipman has "pour[ed] out volumes of ignorance" about the subject and criticized Lipman for giving dangerous and irresponsible medical advice.

== Dieting ==
Lipman is a believer in detoxification and claims to do "three or four cleanses a year". He has stated that "gluten and sugar are the devil" and takes his patients off gluten even if they do not have wheat sensitivity, as he claims that gluten causes inflammation in the body. He advocates a low-carbohydrate high-fat diet consisting of grass-fed animal source foods with no grains and limited fruit, and has also promoted the paleo diet. He recommends grass-fed butter, goat and sheep's milk cheese and leafy vegetables.

Lipman disputes the current saturated fat guidelines and argues against low-fat diets. In a 2018 interview he said that "if the fat comes from nature, or if it’s made by God, it’s more than likely healthy for you" and "natural fats, avocados, coconut oil, meat from grass-fed animals, eggs, these are all good, healthy fats, and it’s only in the past 50 years that we fell into this low-fat ideology."

Lipman says that all people should take four daily supplements: multivitamin, vitamin D, omega-3 and probiotic. He recommends that people should supplement with 2,000 IU of vitamin D per day. Lipman has also incorrectly stated that 80% of the United States population are deficient in magnesium and recommends that people soak in magnesium oil or epsom salts to get magnesium through their skin. Yvette d'Entremont has commented that magnesium deficiencies are rare and has criticized Lipman's advice as unreasonable. Lipman claims to be a "big proponent of intermittent fasting".

== Selected publications ==
- Lipman, Frank; Gunning, Stephanie (2005). Total Renewal: 7 Key Steps to Resilience, Vitality, and Long-Term Health (1st trade pbk. ed.). New York: Jeremy P. Tarcher/Putnam. ISBN 978-1585423842.
- Lipman, Frank; Doyle, Mollie (2009). Spent: End Exhaustion and Feel Great Again (1st Fireside hardcover ed.). New York: Simon & Schuster. ISBN 978-1416549413.
- Lipman, Frank; Claro, Danielle (2015). New Health Rules: Simple Changes to Achieve Whole-Body Wellness. [S.l.]: Artisan. ISBN 978-1579655730.
- Lipman, Frank (2016). 10 Reasons You Feel Old and Get Fat...: And How YOU Can Stay Young, Slim, and Happy!. Hay House, Inc. ISBN 9781401947576.
