= DBD =

DBD may refer to:

== Technology ==
- Database description, a type of OSPF packet
- Deep borehole disposal, a technique to dispose of nuclear waste
- Defective by Design, an anti-DRM initiative
- Dielectric barrier discharge, a type of electrical discharge
- DNA-binding domain, a protein motif
- DataBase Driver, a plug-in module for Perl DBI
- dB(D), D-weighted decibel, a decibel weighting value
- Donation after brain death, of beating heart cadaver organ donation

== Other uses ==
- Day by Day Christian Ministries
- Death Before Dishonor (band), an American hardcore punk band
- Dead by Daylight, an asymmetric survival horror video game
- Democratic Farmers' Party of Germany or Demokratische Bauernpartei Deutschlands
- Don't Be Dumb, a 2026 album by ASAP Rocky
