= Edmund Rolls =

- Born: Edumnd T. Rolls
- Alma mater: University of Oxford (DPhil)
- Scientific career
- Fields: Neuroscience; Computational neuroscience Emotion; Memory; Vision
- Workplaces: University of Oxford; University of Warwick
- Thesis: Neural mechanisms of intracranial self-stimulation in the rat (1970)
- Doctoral students: Heather Berlin
- Website: warwick.ac.uk/fac/sci/dcs/people/edmund_rolls/

Edmund T. Rolls is a British psychologist, neuroscientist and professor at the University of Warwick. Previously, he was a professor of experimental psychology at the University of Oxford.

== Education ==
Rolls was educated at the University of Oxford where he was awarded a Doctor of Philosophy (DPhil) degree in 1970.

== Career and research ==
Rolls research interests are in neuroscience, computational neuroscience, emotion, memory and vision.

=== Selected papers ===
- Rolls, E. T. (2016). A non-reward attractor theory of depression. Neuroscience and Biobehavioral Reviews 68: 47–58.
- Rolls, E. T. (2016). Reward systems in the brain and nutrition. Annual Review of Nutrition 36: 435–470.
- Kesner,R.P. and Rolls,E.T. (2015). A computational theory of hippocampal function, and tests of the theory: new developments. Neuroscience and Biobehavioral Reviews 48: 92-147.
- Rolls, E.T. (2014). Emotion and Decision-Making Explained: Précis. Cortex 59: 185–193.
- Rolls,E.T. (2012). Invariant visual object and face recognition: neural and computational bases, and a model, VisNet. Frontiers in Computational Neuroscience 6: (35) 1-70.
- Rolls,E.T. and Treves.A. (2011). The neuronal encoding of information in the brain. Progress in Neurobiology 95: 448–490.
- Rolls, E.T. (2008). Emotion, higher order syntactic thoughts, and consciousness. Chapter 4, pp. 131–167 in Frontiers of Consciousness, eds. L.Weiskrantz and M.Davies. Oxford University Press: Oxford.
- Rolls, E.T., Tromans, J. & Stringer, S.M. (2008). Spatial scene representations formed by self-organizing learning in a hippocampal extension of the ventral visual system. European Journal of Neuroscience, 28, 2116–2127.
- Grabenhorst, F., Rolls, E.T. & Parris, B.A. (2008). From affective value to decision-making in the prefrontal cortex. European Journal of Neuroscience, 28, 1930–1939.
- Rolls, E .T. & Grabenhorst, F. (2008). The orbitofrontal cortex and beyond: from affect to decision-making. Progress in Neurobiology, 86, 216–244.
- Rolls, E.T., Loh, M., Deco, G. & Winterer, G. (2008). Computational models of schizophrenia and dopamine modulation in the prefrontal cortex. Nature Reviews Neuroscience, 9, 696–709.

=== Selected books ===
- Rolls, Edmund T. (2016). Cerebral Cortex: Principles of Operation., Oxford University Press (OUP)
- Rolls, Edmund T. (2014). Emotion and Decision-Making Explained., OUP
- Rolls, Edmund T. (2012). Neuroculture: On the Implications of Brain Science., OUP
- Rolls, Edmund T. and Deco, G. (2010). The Noisy Brain: Stochastic Dynamics as a Principle of Brain Function., OUP
- Rolls, Edmund T. (2008). Memory, Attention, and Decision-Making: A unifying computational neuroscience approach., OUP
- Rolls, Edmund T. and Treves, Alessandro (1998). Neural Networks and Brain Function, OUP
