= Vani Hari =

American author and activist

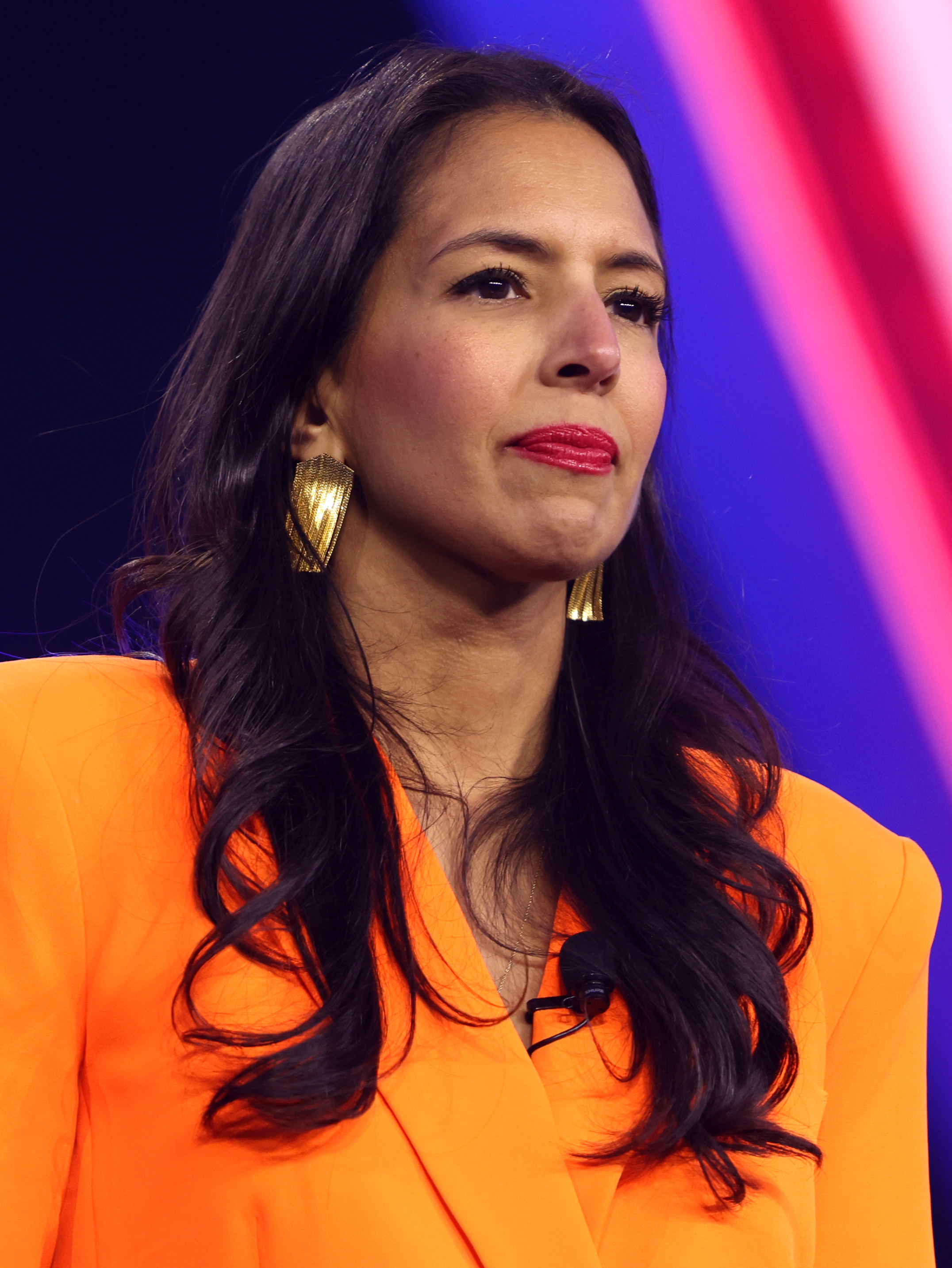
- Hari in 2024
- Born: Vani Deva Hari; March 22, 1979 (age 47); Charlotte, North Carolina, U.S.
- Education: University of North Carolina at Charlotte
- Occupations: Blogger, author, speaker, affiliate marketing
- Known for: Food activism
- Spouse: Finley Clarke
- Children: 2
- Website: www.foodbabe.com

Vani Deva Hari (born March 22, 1979), who blogs as the Food Babe, is an American author, activist, and blogger who criticizes the food industry. She started the Food Babe blog in 2011.

Hari is a New York Times best-selling author. Companies such as Chick-fil-A and Kraft are reported to have changed or reconsidered ingredients in their products following her campaigns.

Hari's ideas on food safety have been criticized by scientists as pseudoscience and chemophobia, and others have drawn attention to her financial interest through promotion and marketing of natural foods, often through affiliate marketing.

== Career ==
Born in Charlotte, North Carolina, to Indian immigrant parents from Punjab, India, Hari first attended the University of Georgia before transferring to University of North Carolina at Charlotte. After graduating in 2001 with a degree in computer science, she worked as a management consultant for Accenture. In her early 20s, Hari was hospitalized with appendicitis. In response, she began looking into health and nutrition issues. She started the Food Babe blog in 2011, and left Accenture in 2012 to devote her time to activism and blogging, as well as marketing dietary and other products. By 2014, her blog was receiving over 54 million views. Hari has over 97,000 Twitter followers, and an official Facebook page with over one million likes. She refers to her followers and supporters as the "Food Babe Army."

Hari has capitalized on her following by selling books, subscriptions to her eating guide, meal plans, products through which she gains affiliate commissions, and through marketing her own line of supplements under the Truvani brand. Critics argue that the controversy she engenders through her activism helps drive sales through her site.

=== Activism ===
In 2011, Hari wrote a piece about ingredients in Chick-fil-A sandwiches which she alleged to be harmful. Chick-fil-A responded to Hari's post in May 2012, inviting her to its headquarters in Atlanta to discuss her concerns. As part of a larger effort to improve the nutrition of their products, Chick-fil-A announced in late 2013 it was removing dyes, corn syrup, and TBHQ from their products. They also announced a plan to only use antibiotic-free chickens within the next five years.

Hari has said that President Barack Obama did not keep a promise that he made during his 2008 presidential campaign to force the labeling of genetically modified food (GMOs). During the 2012 Democratic National Convention, which she attended as an elected delegate, Hari sat in the first row on the convention floor and held a sign that read "Label GMOs!" during Secretary of Agriculture Tom Vilsack's speech.

In 2012, Hari wrote a blog post regarding Chipotle describing her quest to get clear answers about what Chipotle used in their food, saying: "Most of their food was contaminated with genetically modified cooking oil, corn oil, and they were using genetically modified ingredients in their tortillas. Even in the black beans there was GMO soybean oil. You couldn't even order vegetarian and avoid it. It was really unfortunate. Then, when I saw their flour tortillas' package, it said that they use trans-fat. That's crazy." After she published her blog post, Chipotle set up a meeting with Hari where she urged them to publish their ingredients publicly. In March 2013, Chipotle's Communications Director emailed Hari with a link to a new page on Chipotle's website with the ingredients in all of their menu items, along with a statement on the sidebar, "Our goal is to eliminate GMOs from Chipotle's ingredients, and we're working hard to meet this challenge." In April 2015, Chipotle followed up on their commitment to remove GMO ingredients from their food and became the first national restaurant chain to use only non-GMO ingredients.

In March 2013, Hari posted her first petition on Change.org asking Kraft Foods to remove FD&C yellow#5 and FD&C yellow#6 food dyes from their Mac & Cheese. On April 1, 2013, Hari visited Kraft headquarters in Chicago bringing along a petition with over 270,000 signatures and met with executives. Following Hari's visit, Kraft told ABC News Chicago they have "no plans to change the recipe for the original mac and cheese," and "...the safety and quality of our products is our highest priority and we take consumer concerns very seriously. We carefully follow the laws and regulations in the countries where our products are sold." Hari replied, "People have tried to petition the FDA over and over and it hasn't worked. The best way to create change is to hold the food companies responsible." While the dyes are legal in the U.S., Kraft uses a different formula in the United Kingdom without artificial dyes. By the end of October 2013 the petition had received about 348,000 signatures. In October 2013, Kraft announced they would change the ingredients in three of its Mac & Cheese products aimed at children, which included the use of whole grains, reduction in salt and some fats, and changing the coloring; Kraft said that the changes were not a response to the petition but rather were part of an ongoing effort to improve the nutrition of the offerings, which takes several years to plan and implement. Hari claimed credit for the changes. In April 2015, Kraft further announced that they will remove artificial dyes and artificial preservatives from all of its Mac & Cheese products by 2016.

In 2013, Hari wrote about the use of class IV caramel color in Newcastle Brown Ale on her blog and put public pressure on them to drop this ingredient. In January 2015, Heineken announced that they would stop adding class IV caramel color to their Newcastle Brown Ale, and would instead color it naturally with the same roasted malt they had previously used. Heineken's announcement came just prior to the release of her book, The Food Babe Way (February 10, 2015), that devotes a chapter to the ingredients—including caramel coloring—in some beers, wines, and liquors.

In February 2014, Hari launched a petition on her website asking Subway to remove azodicarbonamide (an FDA-approved flour bleaching agent and dough conditioner) from their sandwich bread. The petition gathered more than 50,000 signatures in 24 hours. Subway later announced a plan to remove the ingredient from all of their sandwich breads, a process which began before her campaign. The Center For Science In The Public Interest, who advocates for its reduction, credited Hari for drawing attention to it. The Environmental Working Group supported the removal of azodicarbonamide and urged against its use. Food science experts have pointed out that the level of azodicarbonamide permitted by the FDA for use in bread is too low to pose a significant risk.

In June 2014, Hari posted a petition asking major brewers to list the ingredients in their products, something which U.S. brewers are not required to do. As part of this campaign, she claimed that commercial brewers "even use fish swim bladders" in their beer, as an undisclosed ingredient. NPR cited this as an example of fearmongering and lack of subject matter knowledge, as isinglass, derived from fish swim bladders, has been used as a natural fining agent in food and drink for centuries, and is in any case used primarily in cask ale, not vat-brewed beers, which are normally cleared by filtering. The day after she posted her petition, Anheuser-Busch and MillerCoors released ingredients in many of their products. The trade publication Beer Marketer's Insights called Hari's petition an "attempt of fear-mongering in the name of advocacy." Hari later claimed that she was aware of the historic use of isinglass, and was raising attention to it for the benefit of uninformed vegans and vegetarians. In October 2015 Guinness announced that they are stopping the use of isinglass in their refining process so that their beer will become vegan-friendly.

In August 2014, Hari wrote a blog post in which she claimed there is a lack of transparency when it comes to the ingredients in Starbucks' drinks. She noted that Starbucks does not publish their ingredients online and pointed out the use of class IV caramel color and the lack of real pumpkin in Starbucks's Pumpkin Spice Latte. This blog post received over 10 million views in 2014, and in the fall of 2015 Starbucks debuted a reformulated Pumpkin Spice Latte with real pumpkin and without caramel color. Hari took credit for this change, claiming to have emailed them monthly for updates.

On February 5, 2015, Hari launched a petition on her website asking General Mills and Kellogg's to remove the preservative butylated hydroxytoluene (BHT) from their cereals. The additive has been widely used in cereal packaging in the U.S. for many years. BHT has to be listed as an ingredient on food labels, and some consumer-protection advocates like the Environmental Working Group have advised people to avoid it when possible. Cereals marketed in Europe by General Mills and Kellogg's do not contain the additive. Hari's petition received over 30,000 signatures in 24 hours. On February 5, 2015, General Mills released a statement that they would be removing BHT from their cereal, stating, "This change is not for safety reasons, but because we think consumers will embrace it. We've never spoken with Vani Hari and she did not play any role in our decision," and "...our removal of BHT from cereals is well underway and has been for more than a year."

In August 2015, Hari campaigned Subway in conjunction with Natural Resources Defense Council, Friends of the Earth, the Center for Food Safety, and the U.S. Public Interest Research Group to commit to buying meat produced without the routine use of antibiotics and to provide a timeline for doing so. In October 2015, Subway announced they would transition to chicken raised without antibiotics in 2016 and turkey within the following 2–3 years, and would also transition beef and pork raised without antibiotics by 2025.

Her petition about Kraft's ingredients received over 365,000 signatures, and her Subway petition received over 50,000 signatures in the first 24 hours. Her site had a reported 52 million visitors in 2014 and over 3 million unique visitors per month.

In March 2015, Time named Hari among "The 30 Most Influential People on the Internet".

== Books ==
=== The Food Babe Way ===
Hari's first book, The Food Babe Way, was released February 10, 2015. The book was #4 on the New York Times bestseller list for March 1, 2015 in the "Advice, How-To & Miscellaneous" section. It remained on the list for five weeks. It also appeared as #1 for nonfiction on the Wall Street Journal bestseller list for the week ending February 15, 2015.

=== Feeding You Lies ===
Hari released her second book, Feeding You Lies: How to Unravel the Food Industry's Playbook and Reclaim Your Health, in February 2019. The book appeared on the Wall Street Journal bestseller list for the week ending February 23, 2019. The Daily Beast also listed it amongst 12 Best Selling Books Published in February 2019.

== Reception ==
Hari has received wide criticism concerning the accuracy, consistency, and presentation of her many claims.

Hari is a former management consultant who has a degree in computer science, and has no expertise in nutrition or food science. In response to criticisms that she lacks training in these fields, Hari has stated, "I never claimed to be a nutritionist. I'm an investigator." According to horticultural scientist Kevin Folta, Hari's lack of training often leads her to misinterpret peer-reviewed research and technical details about food chemistry, nutrition, and health. Chemist Joseph A. Schwarcz also criticizes her lack of scientific knowledge, saying: "It isn't hard to deconstruct her arguments. Most of them are so silly. Her basic tenet is guilt by association."

Cheryl Wischhover, a freelance Beauty/Health/Fitness writer in Elle described Hari's tactics as "manipulative", "sneaky", and "polarizing rather than productive." Wischhover also wrote about cases of Hari deleting and failing to acknowledge past articles, and stated "The fact that she tried to 'disappear' these stories makes me distrust and discredit anything else she has to say, and it's mindboggling that others still take her seriously." In December 2014, a National Public Radio article compared her activism to fear mongering. A 2015 Slate article described her writings as using "malicious metonymy" to be deceptive. Referring to the whole food movement, Marion Nestle, professor of nutrition, food studies, and public health at New York University, says Hari "gives the movement a bad name" and prefers Hari focus on more important issues.

Yvette d'Entremont, science writer and former analytical chemist, writing for Gawker, criticized the lack of scientific support for Hari's claims, and described her writing as "the worst assault on science on the internet".

Following d'Entremont's article, Marion Nestle stated that d'Entremont's criticisms were "valid scientifically", and that "the difficulty with the kinds of compounds that Vani Hari has been dealing with is that they're present in the food supply in very small amounts, and therefore it's very hard to test whether small amounts are harmful or not harmful, so the science is uncertain, it's nuanced, it's very hard to talk about." Her concern with Hari is that she "turns these things into something that's black or white—very easy for people to understand, but not necessarily accurate."

Hari has also been accused of banning dissenters from the Food Babe LLC social media accounts in order to create an echo chamber. Social media groups for people who have been banned by Hari have sprung up as a result of these tactics.

=== Promotion of pseudoscience ===
Hari has been criticized by scientists and others for promoting pseudoscience. Kevin Folta has accused Hari of being "afraid of scientific engagement". Folta stated that while her campaigns have been driven by "honest intention", they had the effect of spreading scientific disinformation. Chemistry professor Joseph A. Schwarcz, director of McGill University's Office for Science and Society states Hari "has no understanding of chemistry or food science" and that "her scientific background is nonexistent". He describes azodicarbonamide, a chemical Hari opposes the usage of, as being safe for use in food but unessential. In 2015 skeptic Brian Dunning listed FoodBabe.com as #7 on a "Top 10 Worst Anti-Science Websites" list. Following her beer campaign, David Gorski, a surgeon, stated that she was "peddling pseudoscience" by portraying the chemicals used in the making of beer as dangerous.

In a July 2012 post (which has since been removed), Hari quoted the ideas of Masaru Emoto that microwave ovens cause water molecules to form crystals that resemble crystals exposed to negative thoughts or beliefs, such as when the words "Hitler" and "Satan" were exposed to the water. Steven Novella calls Emoto's claims "pure pseudoscience" and states that "Hari's conclusions about microwaves are all demonstrably incorrect and at odds with the scientific evidence". She later described the post as not her "most impressive piece of work" and noted that it was written when she had first started blogging. In a widely discredited 2011 post, Hari warned readers that the air pumped into aircraft cabins was not pure oxygen, complaining it was "mixed with nitrogen, sometimes almost at 50 per cent" despite ambient air being 78% nitrogen. Hari deleted the post, later claiming it contained an "inadvertent error".

In an October 2011 blog post, Hari claimed getting the flu is not dangerous but getting a flu vaccine is, and the following day tweeted that flu vaccines have been "used as a genocide tool in the past". The tweet was subsequently deleted. Hari's position was criticized as false and dangerous by the American Council on Science and Health.

In The Food Babe Way, Hari states: "There is just no acceptable level of any chemical to ingest, ever." This quote was noted by The Atlantic in its review of the book, used as a pull quote, and criticized at length. The statement was widely commented on by public organizations promoting science, such as McGill University's Office for Science and Society and the American Council on Science and Health.

=== Financial interests ===
In an article in Bloomberg Businessweek, Duane D. Stanford wrote that Hari has an apparent financial interest by generating controversy in order to draw traffic to her website to increase ad sales and drive readers to buy a subscription to her organic Eating Guide, which Hari says is her primary source of revenue. Hari's critics have drawn attention to her affiliated marketing partnerships with organic and non-GMO brands from which she profits by recommending them over mainstream brands.

A 2015 article in Skeptical Inquirer details products Hari declares as having toxic ingredients while Hari promotes and receives sales commissions for products containing the same or similar ingredients. Hari's claims of toxicity have been dismissed by experts in science and medicine as incorrect or exaggerated. Hari in the past removed a product from her site when attention was drawn to it as containing chemicals she has spoken against, a body scrub called Fresh, which contained butylated hydroxytoluene (BHT). However, Hari claims that BHT is not as toxic if applied to skin as opposed to ingested.

== Personal life ==
Vani Hari is married to Finley Clarke. They have a daughter and a son.

== See also ==
- Detoxification (alternative medicine)
- The dose makes the poison
- Wisdom of repugnance
