= Gulp: Adventures on the Alimentary Canal =

2013 book by Mary Roach

- Author: Mary Roach
- Audio read by: Emily Woo Zeller
- Language: English
- Subject: Science; biology; anatomy
- Genre: Nonfiction
- Publisher: W. W. Norton & Company
- Publication date: April 2013
- Publication place: United States
- Media type: Hardback
- Pages: 352
- ISBN: 0393081575
- OCLC: 811599508

Gulp: Adventures on the Alimentary Canal is a nonfiction work by science author Mary Roach, published in April 2013 by W.W. Norton & Company.

== Topics covered ==
The book covers 17 topics:

- Nose Job: Tasting has little to do with taste
- I'll Have the Putrescine: Your pet is not like you.
- Liver and Opinions: Why we eat what we eat and despise the rest
- The Longest Meal: Can thorough chewing lower the national debt?
- Hard to Stomach: The acid relationship of William Beaumont and Alexis St. Martin.
- Spit Gets a Polish: Someone ought to bottle the stuff
- A Bolus of Cherries: Life at the oral processing lab
- Big Gulp: How to survive being swallowed alive
- Dinner's Revenge: Can the eaten eat back?
- Stuffed: The science of eating yourself to death
- Up Theirs: The alimentary canal as criminal accomplice
- Inflammable You: Fun with hydrogen and methane
- Dead Man's Bloat: And other diverting tales from the history of flatulence research.
- Smelling a Rat: Does noxious flatus do more than clear a room?
- Eating Backward: Is the digestive tract a two-way street?
- I'm All Stopped Up: Elvis Presley's megacolon, and other ruminations on death by constipation.
- The Ick Factor: We can cure you, but there's just one thing

== Reviews ==
- Maslin, Janet (April 4, 2013). Food and You, From One End to the Other. Books of the Times (The New York Times). Retrieved June 1, 2013.
- Publishers Weekly. (January 21, 2013) Gulp: Adventures on the Alimentary Canal Starred Review (Publishers Weekly.) Retrieved June 1, 2013.
