= Steve Mirsky =

American journalist

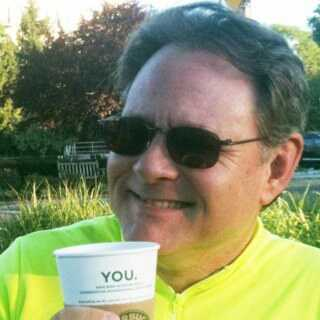
- Mirsky in 2013
- Education: Cornell University
- Occupation: Journalist

Steve Mirsky is an American journalist. He was a writer for Scientific American, the host of the magazine's longform science podcast, Science Talk. and the producer of the daily 60-Second Science podcast. Mirsky also wrote Scientific American's monthly "Anti Gravity" column from 1995 until December 8, 2020.

== Education ==
Mirsky obtained his bachelor's degree in chemistry from Lehman College of the City University of New York and in 1985, obtained his master's degree in chemistry from Cornell University.

== Career ==
Prior to studying chemistry in college, Mirsky explored acting at the American Academy of Dramatic Arts and spent the summer of 1978 with an acting company performing at the North Carolina Shakespeare Festival.

While attending Cornell University, Mirsky received a Mass Media Fellowship through the American Association for the Advancement of Science and received a science journalist assignment for one summer at a TV station, WSVN-TV, in Miami, FL. After graduating from Cornell University, Mirsky was hired at WSVN-TV and then, continuing his work in the broadcast industry, Mirsky moved to radio for a year as a morning host for WMCR in Oneida, NY. After WMCR, Mirsky worked for five years at the Albert Einstein College of Medicine covering basic research for its publications and then became a freelance science writer for a variety of magazines.

Mirsky began writing Scientific American's monthly "Anti Gravity" column in 1994 as a freelancer and joined Scientific American's staff in 1997. He is now a senior editor at Scientific American and continues to write the "Anti Gravity" column. In addition, since 2006, he has hosted Scientific American's weekly Science Talk podcast and contributed to the magazine's daily 60-Second Science podcast.

== Works ==
Mirsky is most known for writing Scientific American's long-running monthly "Anti Gravity" column and hosting Scientific American's weekly Science Talk podcast. He is the author of Anti Gravity: Allegedly Humorous Writing from Scientific American (2007), an anthology of his early "Anti Gravity" columns.

His earlier freelance articles appeared in magazines such as Astronomy, Audubon, Men's Fitness, National Wildlife, Newsday, Technology Review, and Wildlife Conservation. His broadcast credits include National Public Radio, the Medical News Network, and CBS News Overnight.

== Awards and honors ==
Mirsky was awarded:

- a Science Journalism Fellowship at the Marine Biological Laboratory in Woods Hole, Massachusetts, in 1993 and 2001;
- a Thomson Reuters Foundation Fellowship in Medical Journalism at Columbia University's Graduate School of Journalism in 1997;
- a Knight Science Journalism Fellowship at Massachusetts Institute of Technology in 2003; and
- an honorary doctorate from Lehman College at the City University of New York in 2009.

Mirsky was named a Science Writer in Residence for the University of Wisconsin–Madison for the autumn of 2007 and his work on Scientific American's two podcasts has been recognized with Webby Awards in 2010, 2011, 2012, and 2013.

== Bibliography ==
- "The Annual Ig Nobel Prizes". Scientific American. 271 (6): 17–18. December 1994.
- Anti Gravity : allegedly humorous writing from Scientific American. 2007.
- "Presidential Harrisment". Scientific American. 302 (6): C3. June 2010.
- "Show your hand : many doors could be closed to the bearer of unreadable fingerprints". Anti Gravity. Scientific American. 308 (4): 68. April 2013.
- "Bacon, lettuce and tasteless". Anti Gravity. Scientific American. 308 (5): 70. May 2013.
- "Home un-alone : what you live in can shape how you live". Anti Gravity. Scientific American. 323 (3): 82. September 2020.

== See also ==
- Northeast Conference on Science and Skepticism
- Sternberg peer review controversy
- The Moon is made of green cheese
