= Fuzz: When Nature Breaks the Law =

2021 book by Mary Roach

- Author: Mary Roach
- Language: English
- Subject: Science, animal behavior
- Genre: Nonfiction
- Publisher: W. W. Norton & Company
- Publication date: 2021
- Publication place: United States
- Media type: Hardback
- Pages: 308
- ISBN: 978-1-324-00193-5
- OCLC: 1233265880

Fuzz: When Nature Breaks the Law is a 2021 nonfiction book by Mary Roach. Published by W. W. Norton & Company, it details the "curious science of human-wildlife conflict."

In the book, Roach details many ways humans have tried, often unsuccessfully, to handle animals that might harm humans or damage crops and livestock.

The work mostly follows her first-hand accounts of wildlife researchers on the job. For example, Roach follows Colorado Parks and Wildlife when they get called in after bears break into restaurant dumpsters late at night (a hyperphagic black bear, Roach notes, can consume double or triple its usual amount of calories), she tags along as the Wildlife Institute of India holds meetings to warn residents about migrating elephants (which will break through walls and doors to find the sources of enticing food scents), and she visits Vatican City to witness lasers set up to guard Easter flowers, after a famous 2017 debacle in which gulls destroyed the arrangements.

Interspersed throughout the book is a history of previous efforts to handle species considered pests, often with poison or explosives. For example, Roach notes that between 1934 and 1945, an estimated 3.8 million crows were killed in Oklahoma. This was approximately 1-2 percent of the crow flock and didn't have a noticeable effect on farmer losses.

"Such is the inside-out history of conservation in America," Roach wrote. "It wasn't until the 1980s that the word come to mean what it means now. Wildlife and wilderness weren't conserved for their intrinsic value. They were conserved for hunting and fishing."

== Reception ==
The New York Times called the book "an idiosyncratic tour with Roach as the wisecracking, ever-probing guide." The book became an instant New York Times Bestseller and won several awards, including:

- #1 Indie Hardcover Nonfiction Bestseller
- Longlisted for the 2022 Andrew Carnegie Medal for Excellence in Nonfiction
- A New York Times Editors' Choice
- A Washington Post Notable Book of 2021
- A Goodreads Choice Award Finalist
- An NPR 2021 Best Book of the Year
- A New York Public Library 2021 Best Book of the Year
- A BookPage Best Book of 2021, Nonfiction
- A Bookshop.org Best Nonfiction Book of 2021
- A Chicago Public Library Best Book of 2021
- A Library Journal Best Science & Technology Book of 2021
- A Publishers Weekly Best Book of 2021
- Science Best Book of 2021
- A Smithsonian 10 Best Science Book of 2021
- A St. Louis Public Radio Best Book of 2021
