= Grunt: The Curious Science of Humans at War =

2016 book by Mary Roach

- Book cover
- Author: Mary Roach
- Language: English
- Subject: Science, war
- Genre: Nonfiction
- Publisher: W. W. Norton & Company
- Publication date: June 2016
- Publication place: United States
- Media type: Hardback
- Pages: 288
- ISBN: 978-0-393-24544-8
- OCLC: 953133374

Grunt: The Curious Science of Humans at War is a nonfiction work by Mary Roach, published in June 2016 by W. W. Norton & Company. It explores the science of protective gear and life-saving technologies used in warfare.

== Synopsis ==
The book covers the subject of scientific research for the military and some of the less well-known aspects of the lives of soldiers. Instead of focusing on the science that can kill (guns, bombs, drones), Roach looks at the science of saving lives and improving the quality of a soldier's experience. In this book, Roach attempts to answer many questions about the military that the reader may not have thought of before and discusses the challenges that soldiers have to face on the battlefield that do not necessarily directly involve fighting. Each chapter focuses on a different subtopic, such as personal body armor, tank safety, and shark repellent.

== Reception ==
The book received mostly positive reviews from critics. Neil Gussman, in a review for Distillations, described the book as "both entertaining and informative in the best tradition of science writing". Jeanette Farrera of Scienceline described the book as "excellent", praising its depth and humor. Michelle Dean gave the book a positive review, although she noted that it avoids traditionally discussed topics like PTSD in favor of more offbeat aspects of war.

David Kamp of The New York Times criticized the book's overall tone and presentation for being disrespectful of its material, writing that Roach "[showed] a greater interest in racing to her next zinger than in exploring more deeply the implications of the subjects she is writing about."
