= Bonk: The Curious Coupling of Science and Sex =

2008 book by Mary Roach

- First edition
- Author: Mary Roach
- Language: English
- Subject: Science; sex; human biology
- Publisher: W. W. Norton & Company
- Publication date: 2008
- Publication place: United States
- Media type: Print (hardback, paperback)
- Pages: 319
- ISBN: 978-0-393-06464-3
- OCLC: 930702693

Bonk: The Curious Coupling of Science and Sex is a 2008 book by American popular science writer Mary Roach. It follows the winding history of science and its exploration of human sexuality, going back as far as Aristotle and finally ending with recent discoveries about the origination and anatomy of the female orgasm. Throughout, Mary Roach provides a humorous and often very personal view—both as a participant and observer—of humans, scientists, animals, and sex machines. Of the book's numerous accounts, Roach discusses artificial insemination of sows in Denmark, the history of sex machines, and provides commentary on Alfred Kinsey's notorious attic sex experiments. Her footnotes provide additional humor: as in a sentence that includes several DSM diagnoses listed as acronyms, she adds, "And from HAFD (hyperactive acronym formation disorder)". In the book, Roach describes a session in which she and Ed, her husband, volunteer to have sex while being recorded by a groundbreaking 4D ultrasound, in the interests of science. A doctor looks on during the experiment, making suggestions, and finally telling Ed that he "may ejaculate now".

In 2008, Bonk: The Curious Coupling of Science and Sex, was a New York Times Top 10 Bestseller as well as a New York Times Book Review Editor's Choice; it was a San Francisco Chronicle #1 bestseller and made it to the Boston Sunday Globe′s Top 5 Science Books. Bonk was also a Booksense Independent Bestseller and the Publishers Weekly 2008 Staff Pick.

In an interview with D. J. Grothe, Roach observed about her book tour audiences for Bonk:

"It takes a while for the first person to raise a hand, but once one person has asked a question about sex, then you get ten people raising their hand and asking fairly explicit questions. And I do get the sense that it's kind of liberating for people to be able to just talk freely and ask questions using those words—it's the words themselves—I think everybody should just spend an hour just saying: 'clitoris, masturbation, penis, penis, penis, clitoris, clitoris'—just saying it over and over until it doesn't sound strange. Because eventually, it becomes like any other word. And some people are there already, of course, but for some people it just feels kind of scary to say those words in a public setting with strangers".
