= Heather Berlin =

American neuroscientist

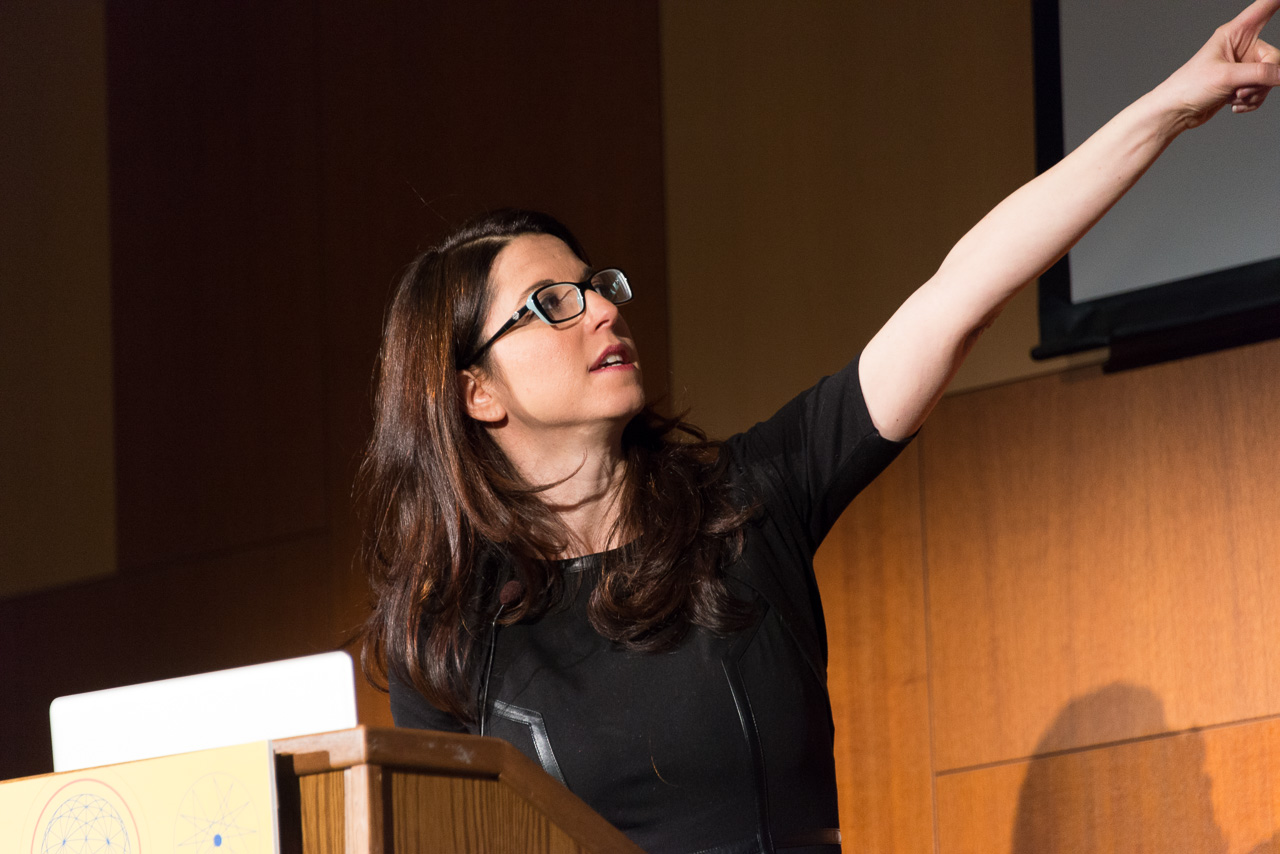
- Berlin in 2014
- Born: Heather A. Berlin; New York, New York, U.S.
- Other name: Heather Berlin
- Education: Magdalen College, University of Oxford (DPhil); Harvard University (MPH)
- Awards: Young Investigator Award American Neuropsychiatric Association; Clifford Yorke Prize International Neuropsychoanalysis Society
- Scientific career
- Fields: Neuroscience; Psychology; Science Communication
- Workplaces: Icahn School of Medicine at Mount Sinai; New York Presbyterian Hospital; Weill Cornell Medicine
- Thesis: Impulsivity, the orbitofrontal cortex and borderline personality disorder (2003)
- Doctoral advisors: Susan Iversen; Edmund Rolls
- Website: heatherberlin.com

Heather A. Berlin is an American neuroscientist, clinical psychologist, and author who is noted for her work in science communication and science outreach. Her research focuses on brain-behavior relationships affecting the prevention and treatment of impulsive and compulsive psychiatric disorders. She is also interested in the neural basis of consciousness, dynamic unconscious processes, and creativity. Her upcoming book, The Fine Art of Losing Control (with Simon and Schuster) will be released May, 2027.

Berlin is a CBS News contributor, and hosts the PBS Nova series Your Brain, the most watched series in the history of NOVA’s YouTube channel with >14 million views. She also co-hosts (with Dr. Christof Koch) the award winning, #1 Science podcast, Science of Perception Box.

She's previously co-hosted the PBS series Science Goes to the Movies, as well as the Discovery Channel series Superhuman Showdown, and StarTalk All-Stars with Neil DeGrasse Tyson.

== Education and early life ==
Born to a Jewish family with Eastern European and Russian ancestry, Berlin grew up in New York. As a child, she was fascinated by the brain, and would often ask questions about consciousness and mortality.

Berlin received her doctorate in experimental psychology/neuropsychology from Magdalen College, University of Oxford and her Master of Public Health from Harvard University, where she specialized in psychiatric epidemiology and health care management/policy. She earned a BS from SUNY Stony Brook, where she was pre-med and minored in Fine Arts. Berlin has also completed a Master’s in Psychology at the New School for Social Research, an National Institute of Mental Health postdoctoral fellowship in psychiatry at the Icahn School of Medicine at Mount Sinai (specializing in compulsive, impulsive, personality, and anxiety disorders), and trained in neuropsychology at Weill Cornell Medicine in the Department of Neurological Surgery.

== Career and research ==
Throughout her career, Berlin has spent a considerable amount of time teaching within the United States and internationally. She is currently an Associate Clinical Professor of Psychiatry and Neuroscience at Icahn School of Medicine at Mount Sinai, and was a visiting scholar at the New York Psychoanalytic Society and Institute, and a visiting assistant professor at Vassar College. Internationally, Berlin was a visiting lecturer at both the Swiss Federal Institute of Technology in Zurich and the Hebrew University of Jerusalem. Berlin's research has been published in American Journal of Psychiatry, Journal of Personality Disorders, Psychiatry Research, Brain, and Scientific American among others.

As both a clinical psychologist and neuroscientist, Berlin divides her time between treating patients and conducting research. In her private practice, Berlin takes a predominantly holistic approach, focusing on improving the well-being of her clients rather than on the “illness”. In her research, she is interested in the neural basis of impulsive, compulsive and anxiety disorders, consciousness, unconscious processes, and creativity. Berlin primarily relies on neuroimaging techniques such as Functional MRI and Diffusion Tensor Imaging (DTI), but has also been involved psychopharmacological clinical trials, and in experimental trials using Deep Brain Stimulation (DBS) to treat refractory obsessive-compulsive disorder (OCD).

Passionate about science communication, destigmatizing mental illness, and promoting women in STEM, Berlin is a committee member of the National Academy of Sciences’ Science and Entertainment Exchange, and on the inaugural committee of the National Academies’ Eric and Wendy Schmidt Awards for Excellence in Science Communication. She has also served on the American Association for the Advancement of Science's (AAAS) Technology Engagement with the Public (CoSTEP), and The New York Times series TimesTalks.

She co-wrote and starred in the critically acclaimed off-Broadway and Edinburgh Fringe Festival show, Off the Top, which is about the neuroscience of improvisation, and the Edinburgh Fringe Festival show, Impulse Control. Berlin has made numerous media appearances including on the History Channel, Netflix (Chelsea Does Drugs with Chelsea Handler, The Mind, Explained, and Unexplainable) Discovery Channel, BBC World Service, StarTalk Radio with Neil deGrasse Tyson, Big Think, documentary films Bill Nye: Science Guy and Narcissist's Playbook, Curious Minds and One World with Deepak Chopra, StoryCollider and TEDx.

== Awards and honors ==
Berlin has been the recipient of numerous awards and fellowships, including American Neuropsychiatric Association's Young Investigator Award, National Education Alliance for Borderline Personality Disorder's Young Investigator Award, and the International Neuropsychoanalysis Society's Clifford Yorke Prize. She also won the BBC's Christmas University Challenge as part of the Magdalen College, Oxford team.

== Personal life ==
Berlin has a daughter, born in November 2013, and a son, born in November 2016, with her (former) partner Baba Brinkman, a rap artist, science communicator, and playwright based in New York City.
