= Mary Roach =

American author (born 1959)

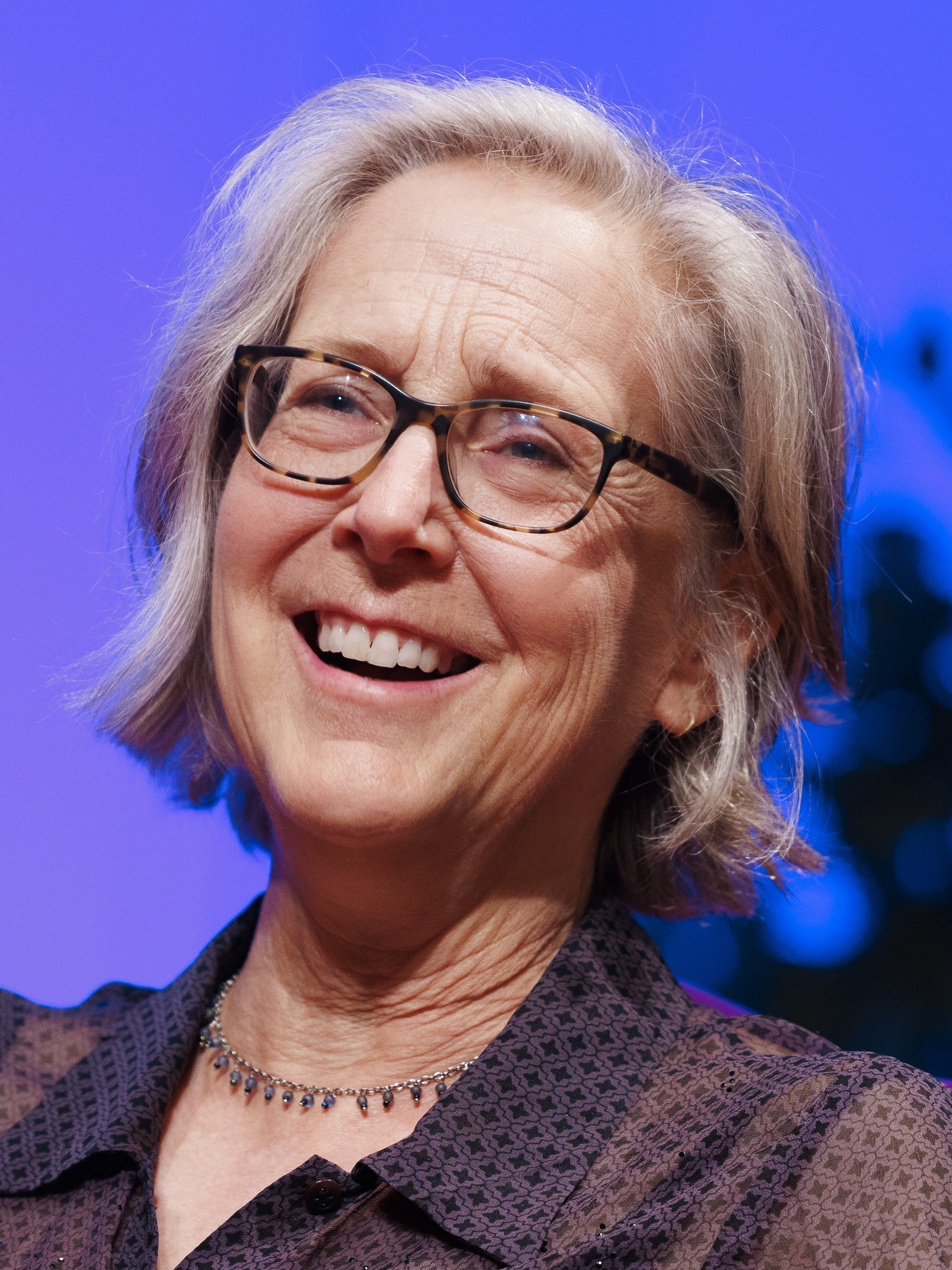
- Roach in 2025
- Born: March 20, 1959 (age 67); Hanover, New Hampshire, US
- Occupations: Author; humorist
- Writing career
- Genres: Popular science; humor
- Website: maryroach.net

Mary Roach (born March 20, 1959) is an American author specializing in popular science and humor. She has published eight New York Times bestsellers: Stiff: The Curious Lives of Human Cadavers (2003), Spook: Science Tackles the Afterlife (2005), Bonk: The Curious Coupling of Science and Sex (2008), Packing for Mars: The Curious Science of Life in the Void (2010), Gulp: Adventures on the Alimentary Canal (2013), Grunt: The Curious Science of Humans at War (2016), Fuzz: When Nature Breaks the Law (2021), and Replaceable You: Adventures in Human Anatomy (2025).

== Early life, family and education ==
Mary Roach was born in Hanover, New Hampshire. She was raised in Etna, a village within the town of Hanover. Both her parents worked at Dartmouth College.

Roach attended Hanover High School and was a straight-A student. She graduated from Wesleyan University in 1981 with a bachelor's degree in psychology.

== Career ==
After college, Roach moved to San Francisco, California, and spent a few years working as a freelance copy editor. Her writing career began in the public affairs office of the San Francisco Zoological Society, producing press releases on topics such as wart surgery on elephants. On her days off from the SFZS, she wrote freelance articles for San Francisco Chronicle's Sunday magazine, Image.

She has written essays and feature articles for such publications as Vogue, GQ, The New York Times Magazine, Discover Magazine, National Geographic, Outside Magazine, and Wired as well as columns for Salon.com In Health ("Stitches"), Reader's Digest ("My Planet"), and Sports Illustrated for Women ("The Slightly Wider World of Sports"), and Inc.com.

From 1996 to 2005, Roach was part of "the Grotto", a San Francisco-based project and community of working writers and filmmakers. It was in this community that Roach got the push she needed to break into book writing. While being interviewed by Alex C. Telander of BookBanter, Roach described how she got started on her first book:

A few of us every year [from the Grotto] would make predictions for other people, where they'll be in a year. So someone made the prediction that, 'Mary will have a book contract.' I forgot about it and when October came around I thought, I have three months to pull together a book proposal and have a book contract. This is what literally lit the fire under my butt.

Although Roach writes primarily about science, she never intended to make it her career. Roach stated in an interview with TheVerge.com, when asked what exactly got her hooked on writing about science, "To be honest, it turned out that science stories were always, consistently, the most interesting stories I was assigned to cover. I didn't plan it like this, and I don't have a formal background in science, or any education in science journalism."

Roach has appeared on numerous television and radio programs including The Daily Show,The Colbert Report, Coast to Coast AM, National Public Radio's Fresh Air, and C-SPAN2 Book TV's In Depth. Her 2009 TED talk "Ten Things You Didn't Know About Orgasm", made the organization's list of its most popular talks of all time.

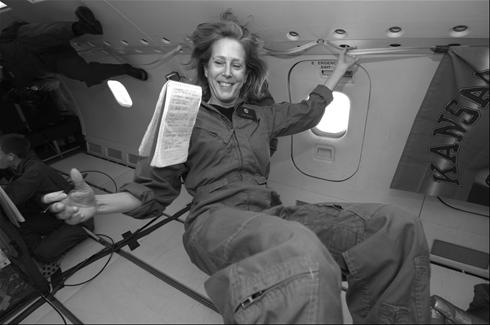
Roach floats weightlessly on a parabolic flight while researching Packing For Mars

Roach has reviewed books for The New York Times and was the guest editor of the Best American Science and Nature Writing 2011 edition. She also serves as a member of the Mars Institute's Advisory Board, as an ambassador for Mars One and an advisor for Orion magazine. She has been an Osher Fellow at the San Francisco Exploratorium and has served on the Usage Panel of the American Heritage Dictionary.

== Awards and recognition ==
Stiff: The Curious Lives of Human Cadavers was a New York Times Bestseller, a 2003 Barnes & Noble "Discover Great New Writers" pick, and one of Entertainment Weekly's "Best Books of 2003." The book has been translated into at least 17 languages, including Hungarian (Hullamerev) and Lithuanian (Negyvėliai). Stiff was also selected for the Washington State University Common Reading Program in 2008–2009.

Spook: Science Tackles the Afterlife was a New York Times Bestseller and was listed as a New York Times Notable Books pick in 2005. Bonk: The Curious Coupling of Science and Sex, chosen as the New York Times Book Review Editor's Choice, was among The Boston Globe's Top 5 Science Books, and was listed as a bestseller in several other publications. In 2011, Packing for Mars: The Curious Science of Life in the Void was chosen as the book of the year for the seventh annual "One City One Book: San Francisco Reads" literary event program. Packing for Mars was also sixth on the New York Times Bestseller list. Gulp: Adventures on the Alimentary Canal was also a New York Times Bestseller and on the shortlist for the 2014 Royal Society Winton Prize for Science Books.

Roach was the recipient of the Harvard Secular Society's Rushdie Award in 2012 for her outstanding lifetime achievement in cultural humanism. The same year, she received a Special Citation in scientific inquiry from Maximum Fun. "The Bamboo Solution", her article on earthquake-proof bamboo houses, took the American Engineering Societies Engineering Journalism Award in the general interest magazine category in 1996. Roach's article "How to Win at Germ Warfare" was a National Magazine Award finalist in 1995.

== Personal life ==
Roach resides and works in Oakland, California, as of 2023, where she continues to write. She arrived in California shortly after graduating college, having driven to San Francisco with friends.

== Books ==
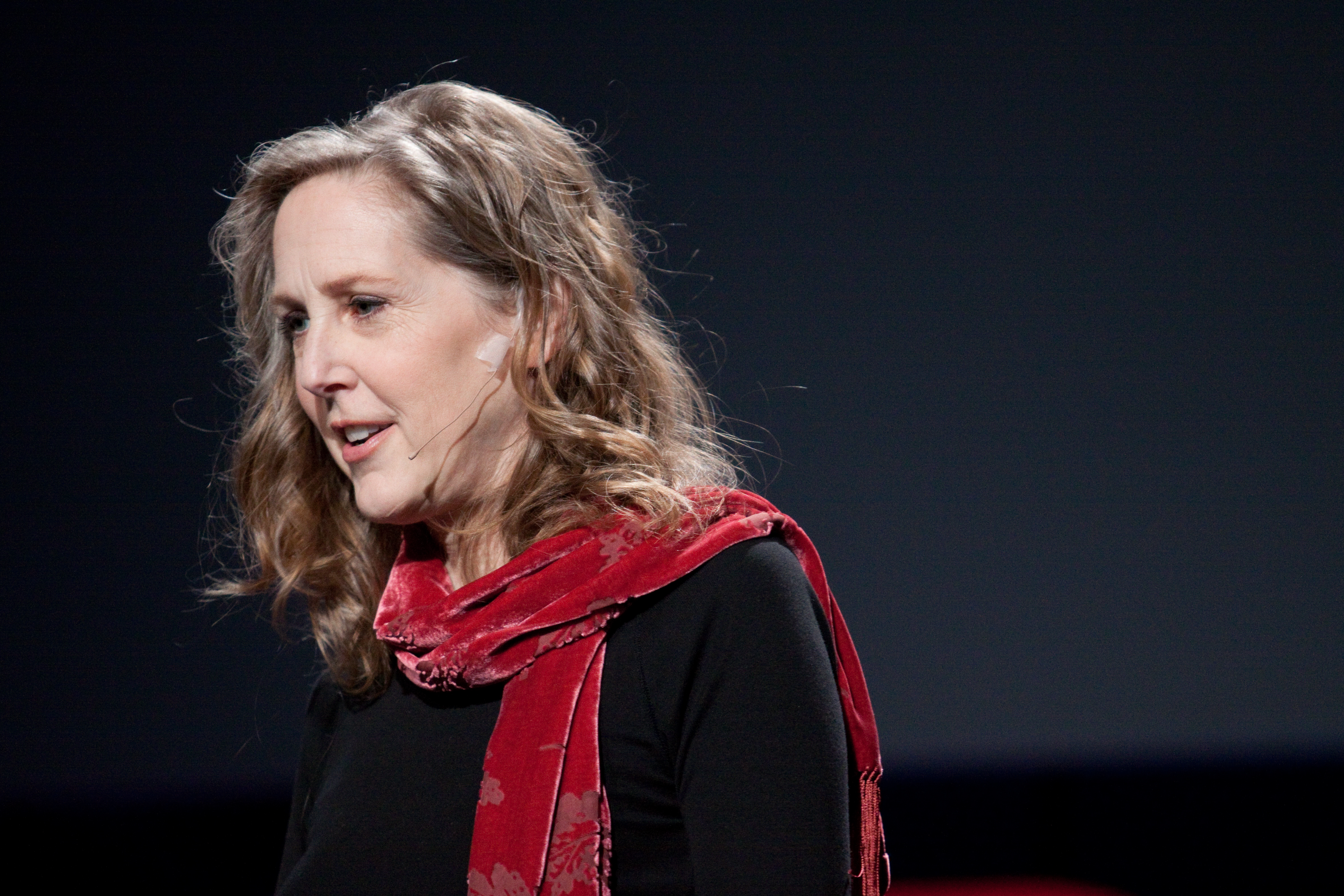
Roach at TED 2009

- Stiff: The Curious Lives of Human Cadavers (2003, W. W. Norton & Company; ISBN 0-393-32482-6 OCLC 55230887)
- Spook: Science Tackles the Afterlife (2005, W. W. Norton & Company; ISBN 0-393-32912-7 OCLC 76884889)
- Bonk: The Curious Coupling of Science and Sex (2008, W. W. Norton & Company; ISBN 978-0-393-06464-3 OCLC 930702693)
- Packing for Mars: The Curious Science of Life in the Void (2010, W. W. Norton & Company; ISBN 978-0-393-06847-4 OCLC 1291915151)
- The Best American Science and Nature Writing 2011 (editor, 2010, Mariner Books)
- Gulp: Adventures on the Alimentary Canal (2013, W. W. Norton & Company; ISBN 978-0393081572 OCLC 811599508)
- My Planet: Finding Humor in the Oddest Places (2013, Penguin Publishing; ISBN 978-1621450719 OCLC 822892403)
- Grunt: The Curious Science of Humans at War (2016, W. W. Norton & Company; ISBN 978-0-393-24544-8 OCLC 953133374)
- Fuzz: When Nature Breaks the Law (2021, W. W. Norton & Company; ISBN 978-1-324-00193-5 OCLC 1233265880)
- Replaceable You: Adventures in Human Anatomy (2025, W. W. Norton & Company; ISBN 978-1324050629 OCLC 1498863835)
