= Stiff: The Curious Lives of Human Cadavers =

2003 book by Mary Roach

- Author: Mary Roach
- Language: English
- Subject: Science, death
- Genre: Nonfiction
- Publisher: W. W. Norton & Company
- Publication date: 2003
- Publication place: United States
- Media type: Hardback
- Pages: 304
- ISBN: 0-393-32482-6
- OCLC: 55230887

Stiff: The Curious Lives of Human Cadavers is a 2003 nonfiction book by Mary Roach. Published by W. W. Norton & Company, it details the unique scientific contributions of the deceased.

In the book, Roach gives firsthand accounts of cadavers, a history of the use of cadavers, and an exploration of the surrounding ethical/moral issues. She places each chapter's content into a historical context by discussing the history of the method of using a cadaver she is about to witness.

Stiff was a New York Times Best Seller, a 2003 Barnes & Noble Discover Great New Writers pick, and one of Entertainment Weekly's Best Books of 2003. It also won the Amazon.com Editor's Choice award in 2003, was voted as a Borders Original Voices book, and was the winner of the Elle Reader's Prize. Stiff has been translated into 17 languages, including Hungarian (Hullamerev) and Lithuanian (Negyvėliai). Stiff was also selected for Washington State University's Common Reading Program in 2008–09.

== Topics covered ==
The book covers 12 topics:

- Practicing cosmetic surgery on cadaver heads
- Body snatching and the early years of human dissection
- The nature of decomposition
- Cadavers for use as crash test dummies
- Using cadavers to analyze a crash site
- Army tests on cadavers
- Crucifixion experiments
- Beating heart cadavers, the soul, and being buried alive
- Decapitation and human head transplant
- Cannibalism in the name of medicine
- New alternatives to burial and cremation
- The author's views on her own remains
