= Deborah Berebichez =

Mexican physicist

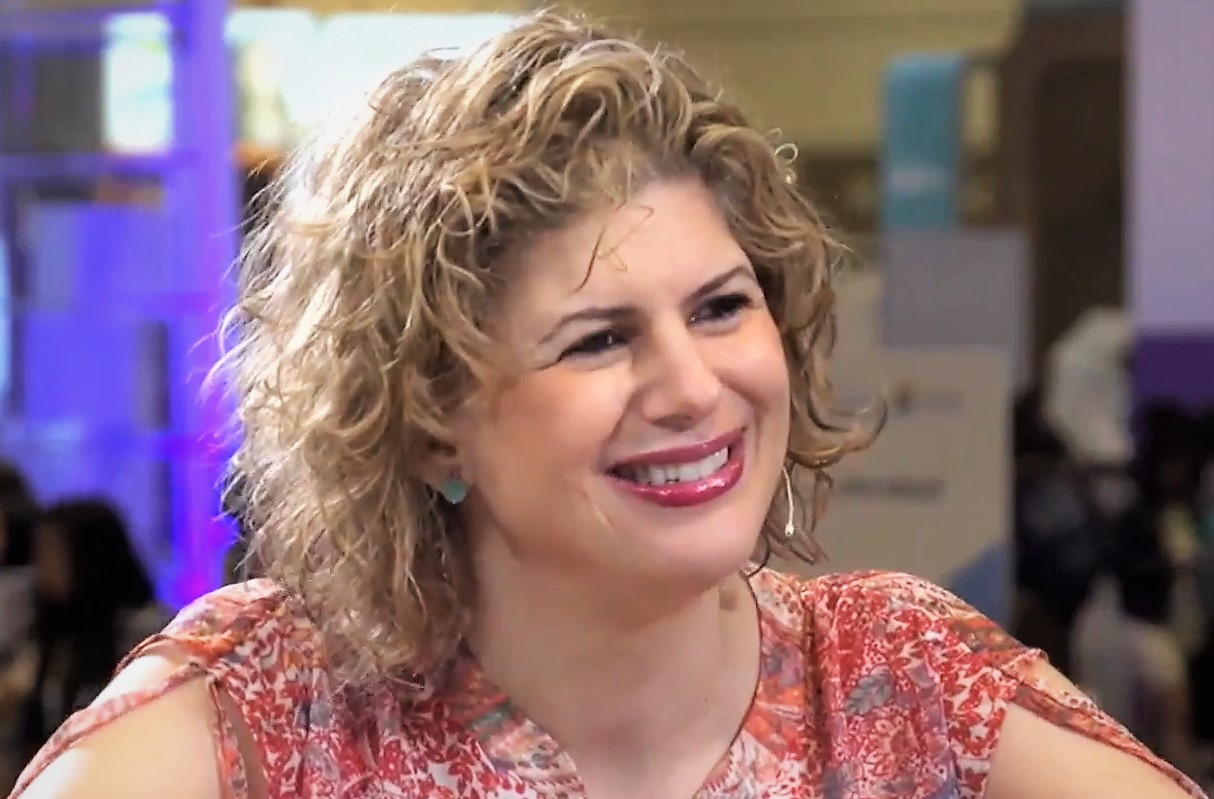
- Berebichez at the 2017 Grace Hopper Celebration of Women in Computing
- Occupations: Physicist, data scientist, TV host, educator and entrepreneur
- Website: www.sciencewithdebbie.com

Deborah Berebichez is a Mexican physicist, data scientist, TV host, educator and entrepreneur who dedicates her career to promoting education in science, technology, engineering and math (STEM) fields. She was the first Mexican woman to graduate with a Ph.D. in physics from Stanford University. She has developed models for cellular wave transmission which are in the process of being patented. Sometimes known as "The Science Babe", she appears in mainstream television and radio segments where she explains concepts in physics in everyday life.

== Education ==
According to Berebichez, she was a curious girl, good at math and science and dreamed of becoming an astronaut. Growing up as a girl in a conservative community, she felt discouraged from pursuing a career in science. Despite being more interested in physics, she started studying philosophy and completed the first two years of university in Mexico City while secretly applying to schools in the US, after having heard that they allowed students to complete several majors. She is Jewish.

After passing an advanced placement test, she was accepted for a Wien scholarship at Brandeis University in Massachusetts where she at first continued her studies in philosophy. Here, she encountered her first science course, an intro-course to Astronomy and in her senior year she decided she should give physics a try. Inspired by Edward Witten's previous switch from history to physics, she was allowed to switch from philosophy to physics and to skip the first two years of the physics major after passing a test in vector calculus. After studying math and physics over the summer for 12 hours each day she passed the test. In the end, she completed the four years physics curriculum in two years and graduated from Brandeis summa cum laude with highest honors in physics and philosophy.

After Brandeis, she returned to Mexico where she completed a master's in physics. She won a merit-based full scholarship from the Mexican government and went on to complete a PhD in physics from Stanford in 2004. While at Stanford, she worked with Nobel laureate Steven Chu from 1998 and co-created the Association for the Advancement of Women in Physics with another female student. It was through her interviews with professors, that she discovered that she was going to become the first woman from Mexico to earn a PhD in physics from Stanford.

== Career ==
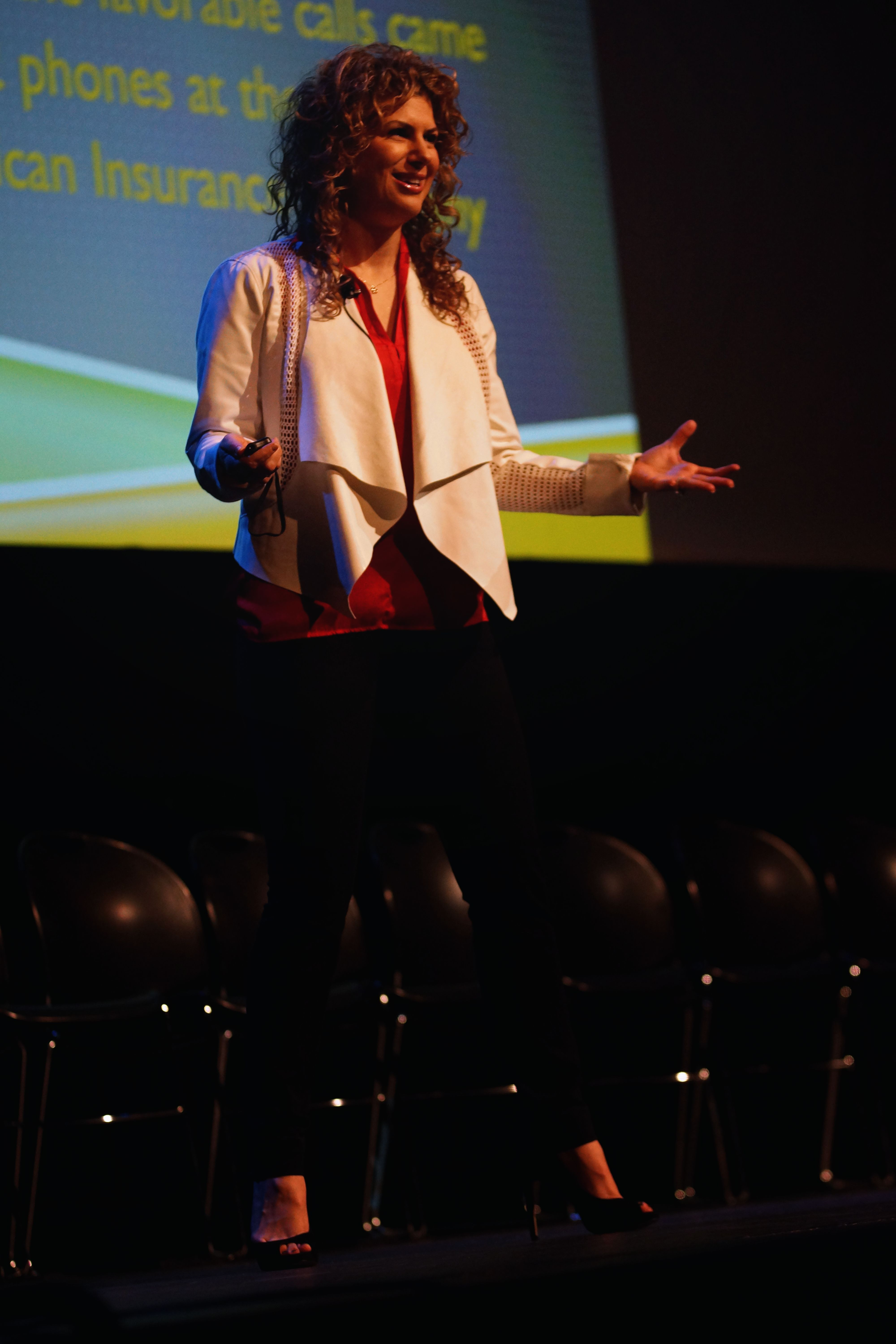
Berebichez speaks on Outrageous Acts of Thinking at the Northeast Conference on Science and Skepticism (NECSS) on April 12, 2015, at F.I.T. Haft Auditorium in New York City.

After completing her PhD, Berebichez was a post-doctoral researcher first at Columbia University's Applied Math and Physics Department and later at NYU's Courant Institute for Mathematical Sciences. Dr. Berebichez has written scholarly articles on the subject of altering the structural design of optical, mechanical and electrical systems in order to prevent signal transmission loss due to wave scattering. She is a member of the American Physical Society.

Berebichez is the Chief Data Scientist at Metis, a leading data science training provider. At Metis she leads the creation and growth of data science training opportunities, including bootcamps, corporate training, professional development, and online programs. She is an active contributor to the national data science ecosystem through public speaking, presentations, and panels at data science conferences and has appeared as a guest expert on CNN and Nova. Previously, she worked on Wall Street as an equity risk analyst for MSCI Barra and as the Vice President of Risk Analytics at Morgan Stanley.

Since 2012, Berebichez has been featured in the television show "You Have Been Warned" (a.k.a. "Outrageous Acts of Science") on The Science Channel. She co-starred in National Geographic's Humanly Impossible from 2011. In her "Science Babe" web video project, she explains everyday scientific phenomena and principles of physics in plain language, such as "The Physics of High Heels". She is a John C. Whitehead Fellow at the Foreign Policy Association, a winner of the Society of Hispanic Professional Engineers (SHPE) STAR Award and a recipient for Top Latina Tech Blogger by the Association of Latinos in Social Media (LATISM).

Over the past 10 years, Berebichez has been a recurring speaker at skeptic conferences such as the Northeast Conference on Science and Skepticism and The Amaz!ng Meeting.

== Volunteer work ==
She was the 2013 Global Ambassador for the Technovation Challenge, an international educational competition sponsored by technology non-profit Iridescent that promotes the programming of science-based mobile applications by girls and young women all across the globe, including creating a business model around the new application and instructing participants on how to pitch their applications to investors.

Berebichez says her mission is to help women and minorities enter STEM fields.

== Personal life ==
Berebichez is married to physicist Neer Asherie. They have a daughter.
