= Spook: Science Tackles the Afterlife =

2005 book by Mary Roach

- First edition
- Author: Mary Roach
- Language: English
- Genre: Science
- Publisher: W. W. Norton & Company
- Publication date: 2005
- Publication place: United States
- Media type: Print (Hardcover & Paperback)
- Pages: 311 pp
- ISBN: 0-393-32912-7
- OCLC: 76884889

Spook: Science Tackles the Afterlife (2005), published by W. W. Norton & Company, a nonfiction work by Mary Roach, is a humorous scientific exploration as to whether there is a soul that survives death. In Britain, the title of the book is Six Feet Over: Adventures in the Afterlife.

Spook: Science Tackles the Afterlife was the recipient of the Elle Reader's Prize in October 2005. Spook was also listed as a New York Times Notable Books pick in 2005, as well as a New York Times Bestseller, and it was also an October Booksense pick.

== Book synopsis ==
Author Mary Roach investigates the possibility of an afterlife and also attempts to find and define the soul, all while using a scientific approach. The book covers these topics:

- Investigations of reincarnation
- Attempts to find the soul (by dissection, weighing, and other methods)
- Spiritualism, fraudulent mediums, and ectoplasm
- Modern mediumship, and "medium schools"
- Attempts to use electronic devices to communicate with the dead, including electronic voice phenomena (EVP)
- Other forces that make people feel haunted electromagnetic fields, infrasound, etc.
- Court cases involving ghosts
- Near-death experiences and out-of-body experiences
