= Yvette d'Entremont =

American science communicator

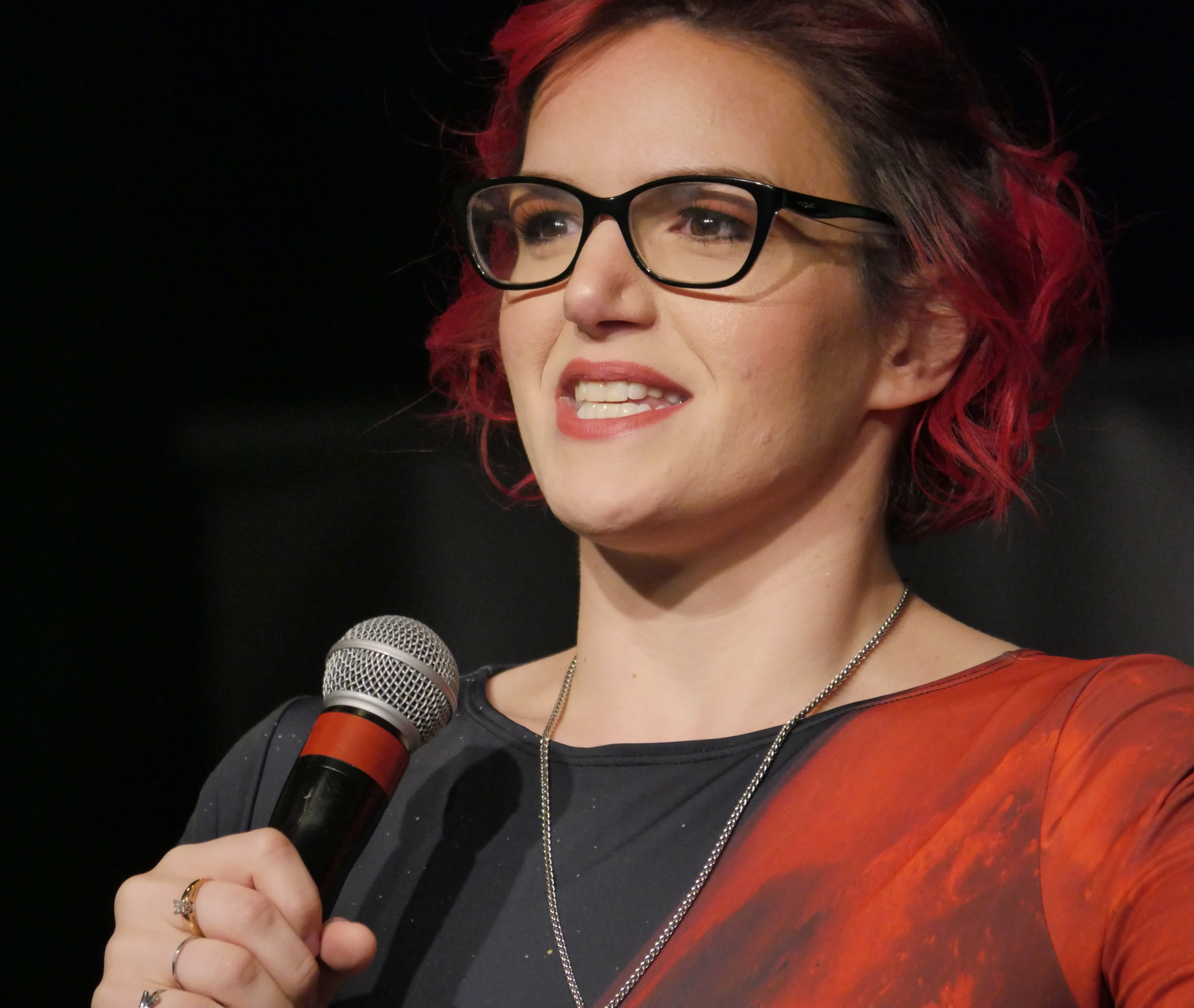
- At CSICon 2018
- Born: Yvette Guinevere d'Entremont; 8 July 1983; Newburyport, Massachusetts, U.S.
- Education: Emmanuel College; Anglia Ruskin University
- Known for: Science writing
- Spouse(s): Derek Ross, March 2018–present
- Website: www.scibabe.com Voice of Yvette d'Entremont

Yvette d'Entremont, also known as SciBabe, (Note: "SciBabe" is an abbreviation of "Science Babe", an alias she began to employ as opposed to Vani Hari's alias "Food Babe", alleging that Hari's claims were not science-based.) is an American public speaker, science blogger, and former analytical chemist. She has a background in forensics and toxicology. Her blog, SciBabe, is dedicated to "clearing up misinformation about science, food and nutrition." She also works to debunk falsehoods in alternative medicine, the anti-vaccination movement, and the anti-GMO (genetically modified organisms) movement.

== Biography ==
D'Entremont was born in Newburyport, Massachusetts, and raised in New Hampshire. She currently lives in Oakland, California. She has bachelor's degrees in theater and chemistry and a master's degree in forensic science. She is a graduate of Emmanuel College, where she was recognized with cum laude honors and distinction in her field.

When d'Entremont began to suffer what she described as "the worst headache of my life", which lasted for eight months before relief, she tried various remedies and attempted different diets, going vegan or all organic. None of these things helped her, and she eventually got the right diagnosis (Hemicrania continua and Ehlers–Danlos Syndrome) and the right medical treatments for her condition. D'Entremont also suffers from celiac disease, an autoimmune disorder associated with the consumption of gluten. She cites these experiences as her motivation for becoming a blogger and debunking diet myths.

D'Entremont has worked for Global Systems Technologies (a DHS contractor), Calloway Labs, and Amvac Chemical Corp in analytical chemistry, and was an adjunct professor at Emmanuel College.

== Work ==
Speaking at the 2017 American Atheists Convention

D'Entremont started blogging in 2014. She believes that using "snarky humor" is an important tool for communicating science and has been influenced by the style of Penn & Teller's show, Bullshit. She began to get wider recognition in April 2015, when her Gawker article about Vani Hari, titled The 'Food Babe' Blogger is Full of Shit went viral.

D'Entremont chose the name "Science Babe" in reaction to Vani Hari's moniker of "Food Babe." Since "Science Babe" had previously been claimed by another scientist, Debbie Berebichez, the name became shortened to "SciBabe." In response to criticism concerning the word babe in her nickname, d'Entremont has said it is about helping science seem "relatable and sexy."

Experienced science communicators have stated that writers like d'Entremont play an important role in educating the public with engaging and accessible scientific information. Pamela Ronald, a biologist at University of California, Davis, applauded d'Entremont's sense of humor.

D'Entremont has conducted several "stunt" tests of homeopathic remedies in order to demonstrate their ineffectiveness or deceptive advertising and labeling. In one event, she drank six bottles of homeopathic remedies sold as "CVS Constipation Relief" from CVS Pharmacy chains, which had no effect except resulting in her being intoxicated with a blood alcohol content well above the legal limit to drive, as the product contained only 20% alcohol and water. In another demonstration, she created a YouTube video in which she took 50 "homeopathic sleeping pills" at once, without effect.

She is currently working as a contributing writer for The Outline and as a columnist for Self magazine.

D'Entremont also co-hosted with Alice Vaughn the podcast Two Girls One Mic: The Porncast, which features humorous commentary about pornography. After three episodes, it was listed in the top 20 comedy podcasts on iTunes.

== Splenda collaboration ==
In late 2017, D'Entremont started to work as a paid spokesperson for Splenda. Since accepting their offer, a series of her blog articles that defend the sweetener have been posted on the official Splenda website. These are part of the brand's campaign to "Debunk the Junk" (i.e., correct perceived misconceptions about Splenda).

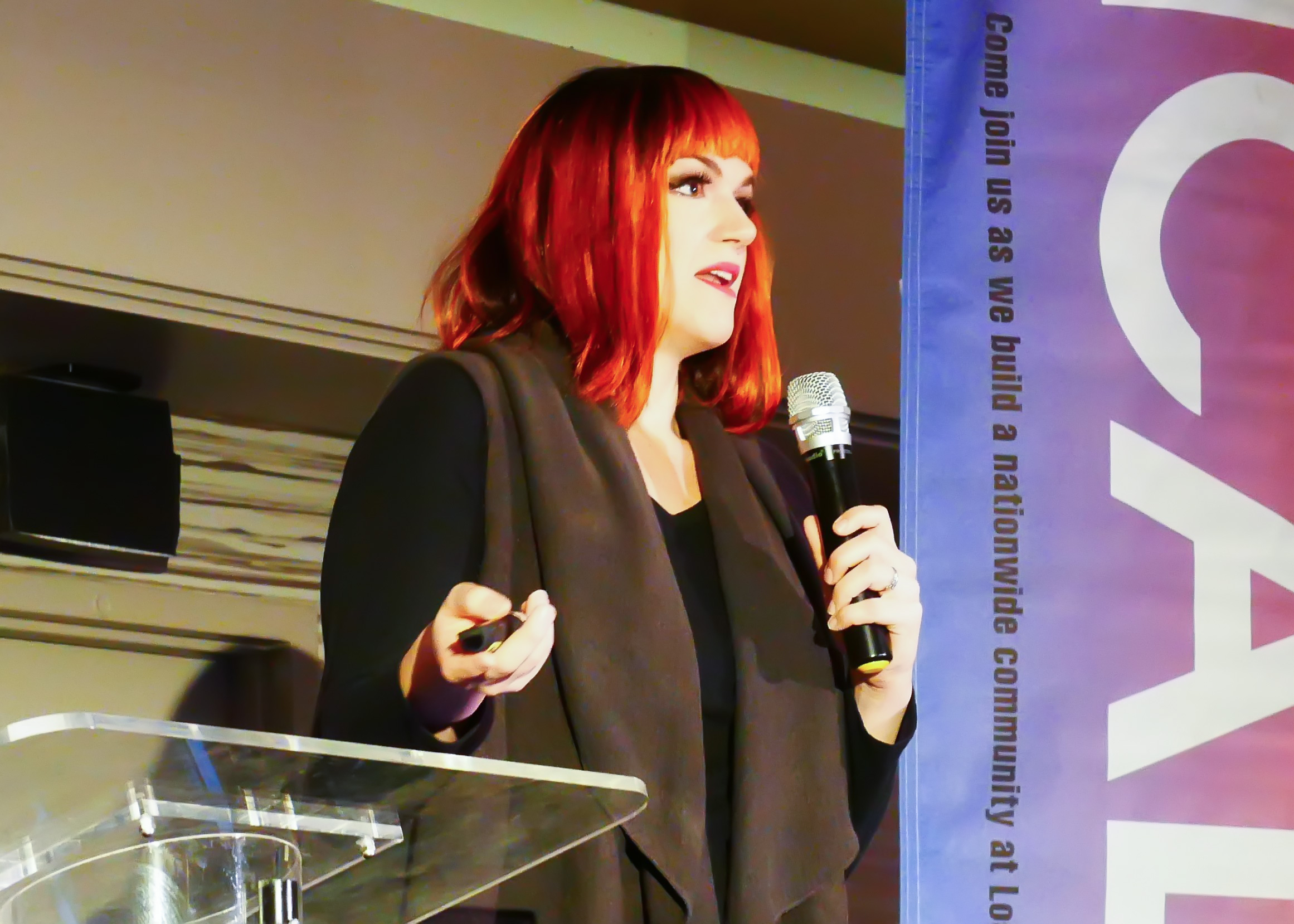
"The business of being a guru" February 2018

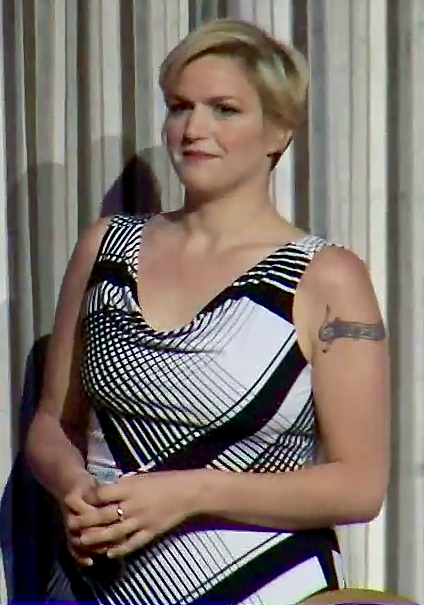
American Atheists 2015 National Convention

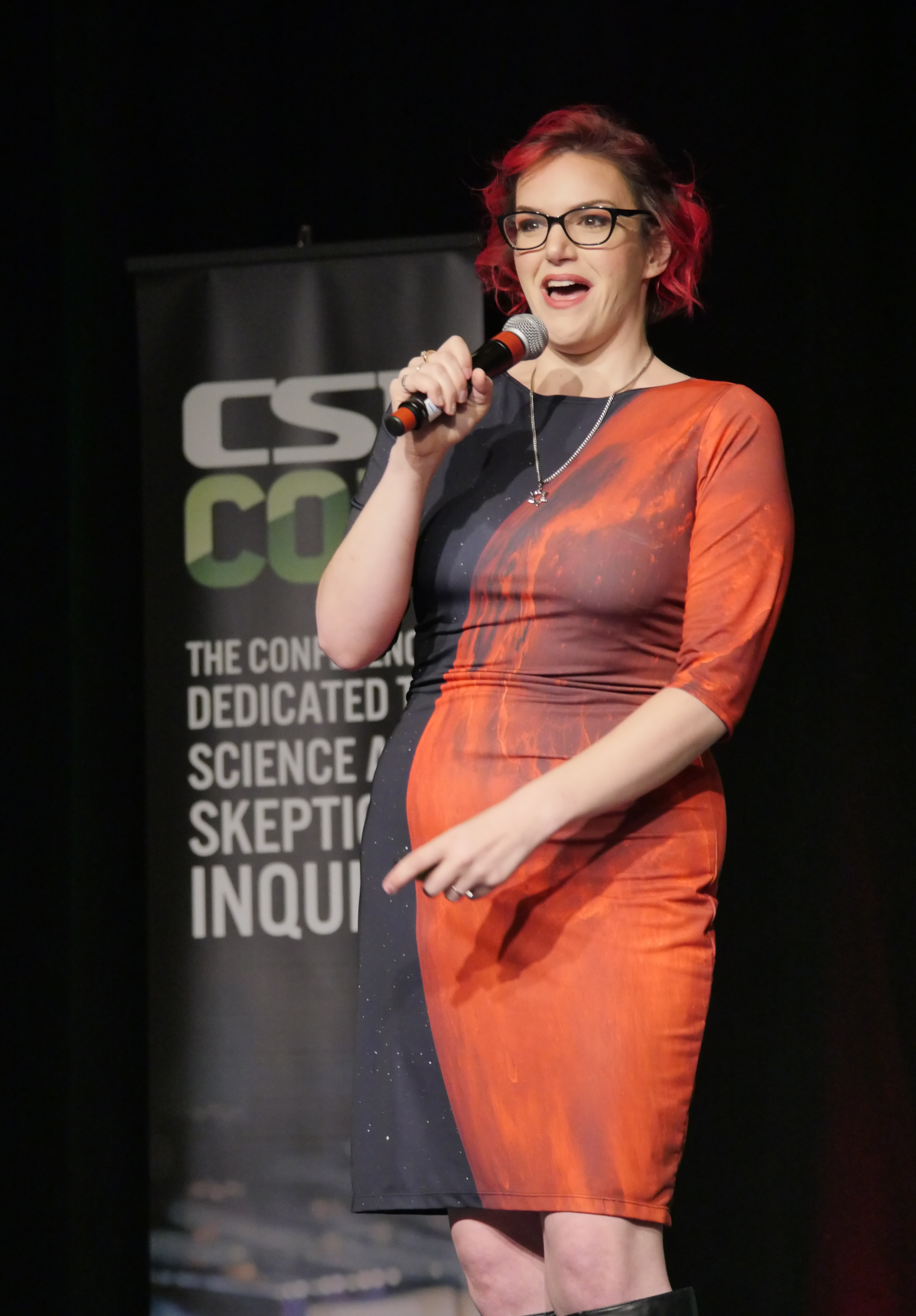
CSICon 2018 "SciBabe's Guide to Surviving Fake News"
