= Beating heart cadaver =

Corpse with medically-maintained heartbeat

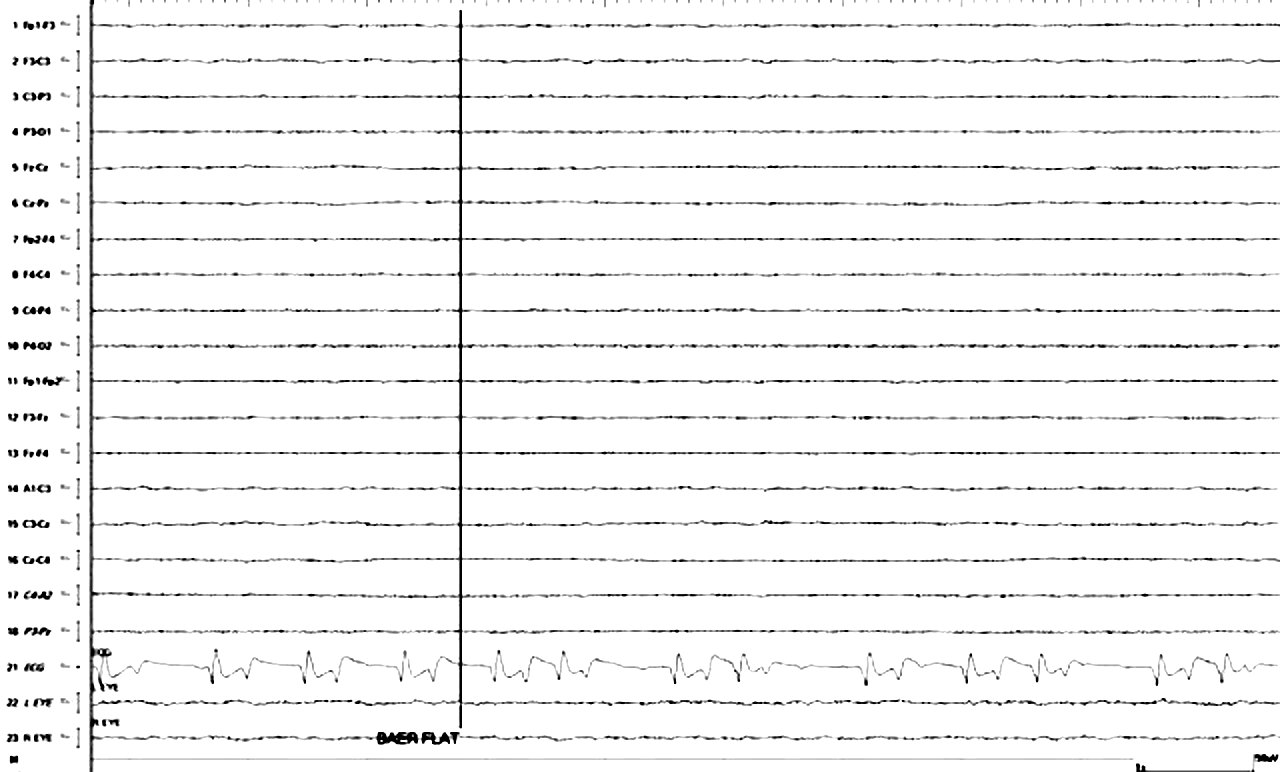
Isoelectric electroencephalography (EEG) in brain death shows no visible brain electrical activity

A beating heart cadaver is a body that is pronounced dead in all medical and legal definitions, connected to a medical ventilator, and retains cardio-pulmonary functions. This keeps the organs of the body, including the heart, functioning and alive. As a result, the period of time in which the organs may be used for transplantation is extended. A beating heart cadaver requires a ventilator to provide oxygen to its blood, but the heart will continue to beat on its own even in the absence of brain activity, thanks to its pacemaker cells. There is an advantage to beating heart cadaver organ donation because doctors are able to see the vitals of the organs and tell if they are stable and functioning before transplanting to an ailing patient. In addition to prolonging organs' viable time to be transplanted, a small number of cases in recent years indicate that it can also be implemented for a brain-dead pregnant woman to reach the full term of her pregnancy.

== History ==
The observed phenomena of lifelike qualities after death is not a new concept. In René Descartes' Discourse on the Method, he notes that decapitated animals move and display characteristics of a living body a few seconds after decapitation which was published in 1637. This continued into the French Revolution where it was observed that people who had been beheaded showed movements in facial muscles and hearts could continue to beat for almost an hour past the time of beheading. The guillotine in some cases did not completely sever head from body. In 1875 an examiner named Pierre Jean Cabanis was assigned the duty of making sure a body was truly dead. There were also stories involving beheadings where the victims would stand up and walk around before falling dead. The ambiguity around brain death and true death has followed it to present day. In an effort to clarify some of these gray areas, the Harvard Medical Committee developed criteria for identifying a body as dead in 1968. These criteria required patients to be completely unaware and unresponsive to external stimuli, have no spontaneous muscle movements, and exhibit no reflexive response even when manipulated. They also required that an electroencephalography (EEG) show no signs of activity. The purpose of this report was to encourage physicians to distinguish brain death and irreversible coma from a persistent vegetative state where the patient still has some awareness and cycles through sleep and wakefulness.

In 1971 similar Minnesota criteria were published eliminating the EEG, repeating the exam after 12 hours, a severe lesion in the brain, and increasing the duration of the apnea test to four minutes rather than Harvard's three minute guideline. Other slight changes in the next decades included the United Kingdom's decision to eliminate the repetition of the exam and change from a duration of the apnea test to specified levels of CO_{2} in 1976. Later, in 1981 the President's Commission reinstated the apnea test and the repeat exam. In a study done in 1989, only 35% of 195 physicians and nurses involved in organ procurement polled knew brain death criteria. These were not the same nurses and physicians who diagnose brain death. Presently, there is hot debate over the protocol for diagnosing someone as brain dead due to widespread disinformation and misinformation on the internet.

The American Academy of Neurology created a prerequisite and neurological clinical assessment to be used as guidelines for determining brain death published in 2010. To be considered for brain death the body must have a determinant cause of coma, have normal systolic blood pressure, and pass two neurological tests. These neurological assessments commonly consist of an apnea test, reflex tests where the body is manipulated or exposed to a stimulus and does not react, or be in a coma where there is complete unresponsiveness. Cerebral angiography, electroencephalography, transcranial doppler ultrasonography, and cerebral scintigraphy are some of the tests that are used to test if there is any significant brain activity.

== Care ==
Caring for a beating heart cadaver is similar to caring for a living patient. Since the brain has stopped functioning, the hormone levels and blood pressure must be regulated by intensive care unit (ICU) personnel. The protocol for preserving the cadaver aims to prevent infection and maintain adequate oxygenation of tissue. The cadaver's status must be continuously monitored, so that ICU staff can prevent organ failure or quickly operate to save threatened organs.

== Organ recovery ==
A beating heart cadaver is kept alive in order to keep its organs from decaying before they can be transplanted. Surgeons will remove the organs, one after the other, and have them transferred to the recipients' treating teams. The entire recovery process is usually completed within four hours. This process was formerly known as an "organ harvest", but the name has since changed to the milder "organ recovery". Many organs can be extracted, and many lives can be saved by one body. The bodies are generally those of organ donors, who have either given first-person consent to become an organ donor, presumptive consent by not explicitly declining to donate or whose legal next-of-kin makes the decision to donate. Some donated organs are taken from non-heart-beating donors. Organs from brain deaths, however, have a better success rate, and currently most organ donation is from these deaths.

How long the brain-dead person is kept on the ventilator may vary depending on the availability of surgical teams and the wishes of the family of that brain-dead person. An anesthesiologist is regularly present at organ donation surgical procedures, not for pain, but to monitor the vital signs and administer medications to optimize organ harvest. Due to the results of the apnea test if a person lacks the brain function to breathe unassisted, it is concluded that it would also lack the brain function to relay the sensation of pain. The anesthesiologist also ensures that muscle spasms or reflexes do not occur during the procedure. Though the brain may be dead, the pathway that reflexes follow does not pass from the stimulus in the body to the brain. Instead the spinal cord coordinates the knee-jerk reactions of reflexes including pulling back from the pain of putting a hand in an open flame or jerking away from an invasive incision. When the brain is dead these pathways remain intact and the anesthesiologist is present to ensure that these reactions do not complicate the procedure.

== Brain death and pregnancy ==
Pregnancy can be prolonged after brain death. It is then possible to deliver the baby by means of caesarian section. Cadavers have been reported to support a fetus for a period of 107 days. After delivering the baby, some cadavers have subsequently become organ donors. Since 1981 there have been 22 recorded instances of keeping a mother declared brain dead in a beating heart cadaver state until the baby is delivered.

A review of 11 of these unique circumstance pregnancies was conducted in 2000. Four of these cases involved a persistent vegetative state of the mother and in 7 maternal brain death was diagnosed. The women that underwent these gestation periods all delivered preterm an average of 30.5 weeks, where a normal pregnancy is around 35 weeks for full term. The mothers were observed to have severe hypotension once in the brain dead or vegetative state and in all but one case the baby was delivered by cesarian section. It has also been found that by the 24th week of pregnancy intensive care is not as necessary and the mother is more stable than treatment occurring before the 24th week. Common complications involved inability to regulate temperature which is treated with heating and cooling blankets, as well as failure of the endocrine system which is important in maintaining a stable fetal environment. Following the delivery of the baby, organs of the mother are harvested as well.

From an ethical perspective the family and next of kin are often involved in the decision to terminate or prolong the pregnancy. This can be a difficult decision given the level of care required to keep the mothers living for the duration of their gestation which can vary. Intensive care of a vegetative state patient is not usually advised due to the dismal chances of recovery, but in the case that the fetus could survive this care is often justified and administered at the discretion of the family. Intense counseling and advisement by physicians and neonatal experts often accompanies these rare situations.

== Ethical debate ==
Brain death is defined as irreversible cessation of all functions of the entire brain, including the brain stem: coma (with a known cause), absence of brainstem reflexes, and apnea. When doctors take away ventilation systems and patients fail to breathe, move, or show any signs of arousal on their own they are considered brain dead. This test is called an apnea test. The ventilator is taken away and is reconnected only if the person decided to be an organ donor. This definition can create some cognitive dissonance because not responding to stimulation may show a problem with the central nervous system, yet when someone has a beating heart and lungs that will still function with the help of a ventilator it is difficult for some to accept as death. Brain death patients have characteristics of the living and the dead.

=== Social issues ===
Organ recovery from beating heart cadavers has remained ambiguous to the public. There is a guideline for organ transplantation consisting of two parts. It states that organ donors must be dead before removing the organs, and removing the organs is not the cause of death. This clause is in place to ensure that organ donation is not exploited to use people purely as a means to an end. However, many believe that even with these guidelines in place the protocol for organ donation still has room for criticism. There is an opinion that negative views from public and medical personnel on this subject tend to stem from a lack of understanding of what it means to be considered brain dead and how these decisions are made, but there are also legitimate concerns relating to the consciousness of the patient. One social issue that is commonly brought up is the potential for conflict of interest for the medical team examining the body. Another issue raising concerns in the organ donation by beating heart cadaver field is the administration of drugs to the patient that prevent clotting prior to the donation procedure. These drugs are not beneficial to the patient and are intended solely to help the recipient of the organs. To alleviate some of these social concerns, there has been push for a standard in determining death and creating a normalized system for transplantation in these patients.

=== Religious and cultural differences ===
From a religious standpoint, the encouragement of organ donation or acceptance may vary. The Catholic church with input from Pope John Paul II, identified transplantation from beating heart cadavers or living subjects as acceptable if there are no added risks to the donor. This has been widely debated in Japan where the first heart transplant took place in 1968 and the patient died a few months after the procedure. Since then, more transplantation procedures have taken place but it is still a controversial subject. Transplantation in naturalist religions and cultures such as those of the Native Americans, Buddhists, and Confucianists tend to dissuade the use of living donors and transplantation. The body is idealized as a home for a soul and the organs belonging to a person are considered perverse if utilized by another person. No religion specifically outlaws the use of beating heart cadavers or prefers them to non beating heart cadavers. Western cultures more widely accept the use of transplantation by beating heart cadavers than more conservative cultures. The main concern of many religions and cultures is ensuring the body is not objectified or disrespected in harvesting and transplantation of organs.

== Cultural references ==
Award-winning Canadian writer Colleen Murphy's play Beating Heart Cadaver had its premiere in the United Kingdom on 3 April 2011 at the Finborough Theatre, London.

== See also ==
- Brain stem death
- Clinical death
- Heart transplantation
- Legal death
- Stiff: The Curious Lives of Human Cadavers
- Transplant surgery
