= Otakuthon =

Anime convention in Montreal, Canada

Coordinates: 45°30′18.69″N 73°33′35.24″W

- Status: Active
- Genre: Anime
- Venue: Palais des congrès de Montréal
- Locations: Montreal, Quebec
- Country: Canada
- Inaugurated: June 10, 2006; 20 years ago
- Most recent: August 7–9, 2026
- Next event: August 13-15 announced at the closing ceremony
- Attendance: 36,936 attendees announced at the end of closing ceremony
- Organizer: Otaku Anime of Concordia University (2006–2007); Quebec Anime Committee (2008–2013); Otakuthon Cultural Society (2014–present)
- Filing status: Non-profit
- Website: otakuthon.com

Otakuthon is a Canadian anime convention promoting Japanese animation (anime), Japanese graphic novels (manga), related gaming and Japanese pop-culture (music, cinema, television). It is held annually for 3 days in downtown Montreal during a weekend in August. It is a non-profit, fan-run anime convention that was initiated by Concordia University's anime club, named Otaku Anime of Concordia University (Otaku Anime for short). The name "Otakuthon" is a portmanteau of the Japanese word "otaku" and "marathon". Otakuthon strives to be a bilingual (French and English) event, having programming, the masquerade and the program book in both official languages. The first edition of Otakuthon was held in 2006 in early June, but later moved to early-mid August / late July from 2007 onward. The most recent edition, Otakuthon 2026, was held on August 7-9, 2026 at the Palais des congrès de Montréal.

== Programming ==
As with most other anime conventions, Otakuthon offers a wide range of programming, exhibits, and other events. Otakuthon's programming consists of cosplay events, a masquerade, vendors, an Artists' Area, panels and workshops, game shows, anime video screenings, dances, karaoke and music concerts. New to 2008 were photo booths, a garage sale and a manga library.

- Art: The Artists' Area is an artists' marketplace for illustrators, painters, writers, and crafters to display and sell their arts and crafts. A separate Art Gallery allows artists to display and auction their artworks.
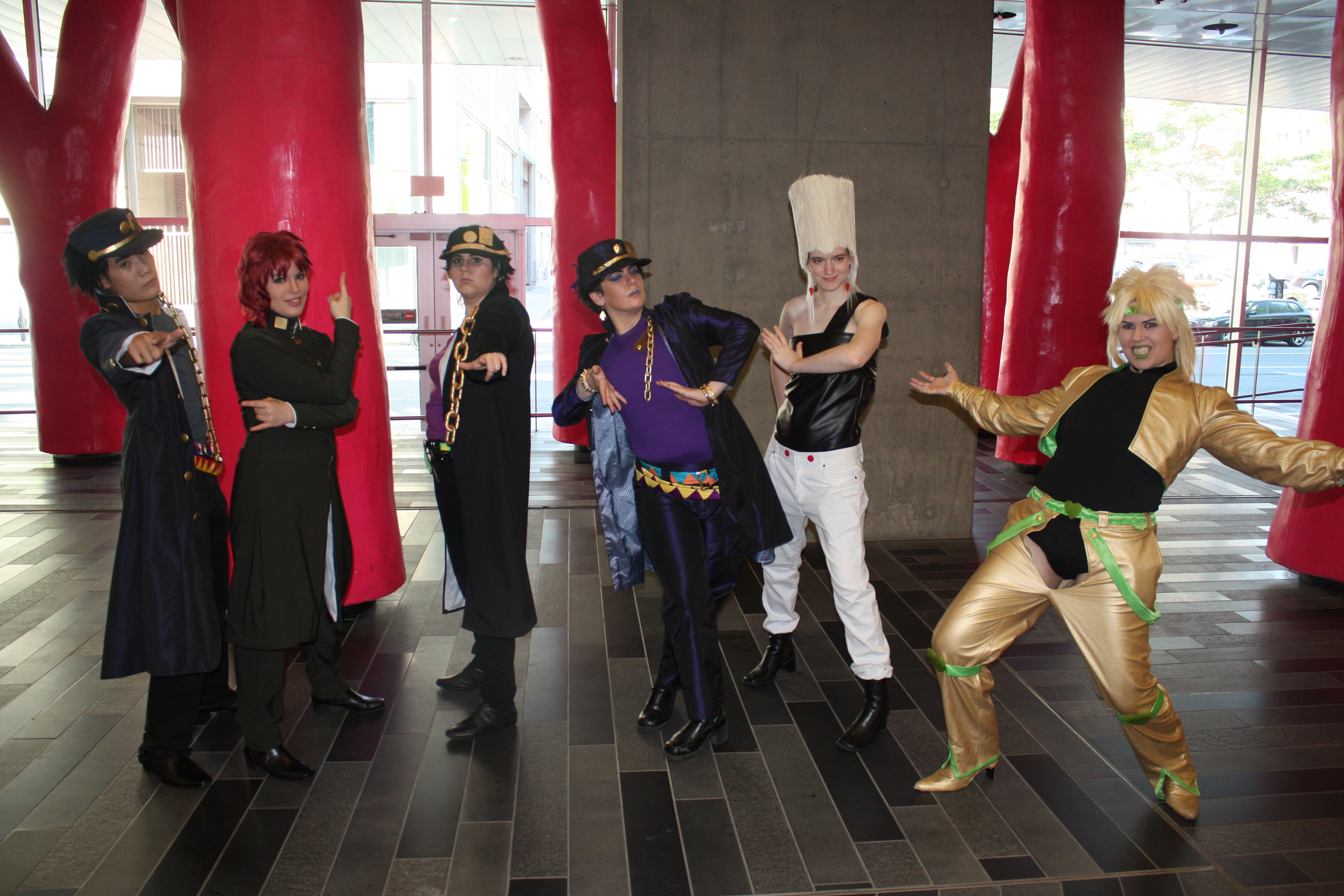
- Stardust Crusaders Group Cosplay - Otakuthon 2014
  Cosplay events: Otakuthon features a Cosplay Skit Contest called the Otaku Skit Show, a Masquerade, a Cosplay Chess and a Cosplay RPG Battle. Many attendees spend most of the convention in costume as their favorite anime, manga or video game character. Some participate in the Otaku Skit Show, the Masquerade (one of Otakuthon's largest events), the Cosplay Chess and the Cosplay RPG. There are also photo booths where attendees can have their photos professionally taken in costume, and the Cosplay Café, where attendees can enjoy Japanese snacks, meals, desserts and drinks while being served by volunteers in cosplay. New in 2014 was the Canadian Preliminaries for the World Cosplay Summit, where cosplayers from Canada compete and qualify to represent the country at this international cosplay event in Japan (see History section).
- Gaming: Otakuthon has a large room for playing video games on consoles and PCs, with tournaments scheduled throughout the weekend. It has also tables reserved for tabletop card-trading games such as Magic: The Gathering and boardgames such as Settlers of Catan.
- Merchandise: The convention has a large Dealers' Area in which commercial merchants such retailers and professional artists and crafters set up booths and sell anime, manga and video game related merchandise. It is one of the main attractions of the convention. There is also a garage sale section where attendees can buy used merchandise items.
- Music: There are musical performances throughout the weekend. There is at least one concert at the convention featuring a musical Guest. Otakuthon also features karaoke rooms and hosts the Otakuthon Idol singing contest and the J-Music in Motion show.
- Panels and workshops: Otakuthon, like almost every convention, has panels and workshops on subjects such as various anime series, how to draw manga, voice acting, Japanese culture and a variety of other topics. While Guests of Honour discuss and tell news or stories about their roles or occupations and answer questions from the audience, most panels and workshops are given by fans rather than Guests.
- Saturday Night Dance: There is a late-night dance party on Saturday night hosted by Montreal area (and sometimes Guest) anime DJs.
- Video screenings: There are many rooms in which anime series, films and OVAs and live action J-Dramas are shown on projector screens during the convention. Fan-made productions such as fan parodies and anime music videos (AMVs) are also shown. For those who prefer reading manga, there is a room where the entire manga library collection of Otaku Anime is at the disposal of attendees to borrow and read.
- Other attractions: Attendees can meet Guests and get items autographed, or engage in the weekend-long anime-themed Otakuthon Misadventures live-action role-playing (LARP) game with dozens of participants. There are also various other games, events, shows and contests such as the opening and closing ceremonies, the fashion show, the Sunday morning brunch, Trollball, Otakuthon Turnabout, the Anime Mystery Dating Game, Anime Name That Tune, Anime Win, Lose, or Draw, the Human Battleship Game, Yurika Kart, and DollFest activities.

=== Sub-events ===
Year after year, Otakuthon hosts a number of sub-events, a series of programming and activities based around specific passions.

- Yaoithon: A celebration of all things yaoi, including shounen-ai, slash-related phenomena and related fandom and communities, with events such as panels, screenings and workshops.
- Yurithon: A celebration of all things yuri, including shoujo-ai and femmeslash, with events such as panels and screenings.
- Dollfest: A celebration of both ball jointed dolls and Asian dolls. Events include panels, workshops, a doll masquerade and swap meet.
- Hakurei Shrine Festival: Also known as TouhouFest, this sub-event celebrates the Touhou Project video games. Hakurei Shrine Festival first began in 2013 and has included panels, cosplay meet-ups, screenings, video game tournaments, and art and merchandise swaps.
- Pokéthon: A Pokémon-themed sub-event that took place in 2014 and 2016. Pokéthon was the first series of Pokémon-themed fan-run events in Canada, and included panels, a video game tournament, card game tournament, trivia contest and cosplay photo-shoot. They also helped launch the Montreal Pokémon League.

=== World Cosplay Summit Canadian Preliminaries ===
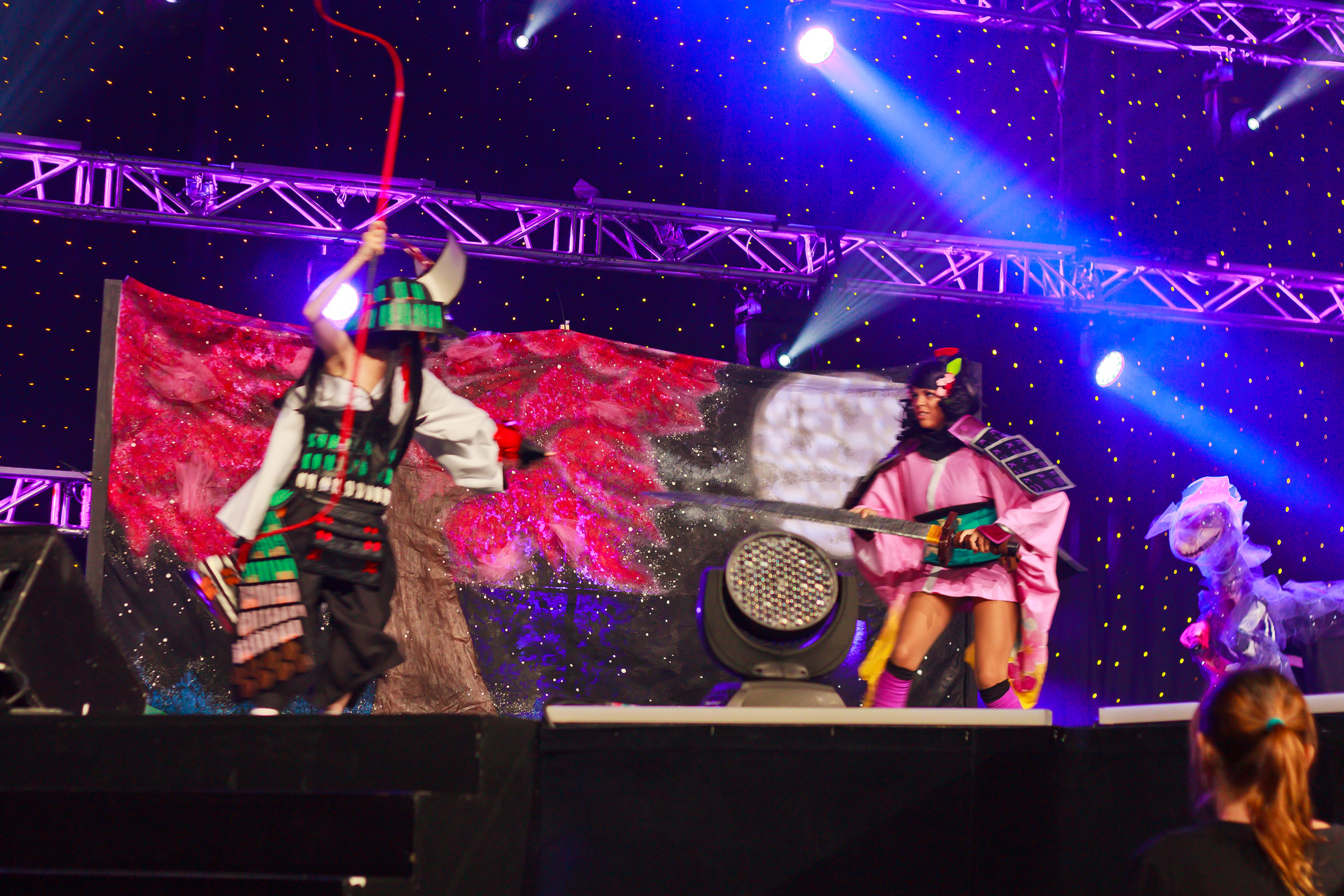
Contestants perform on stage at the 2014 Canadian Preliminaries.

In 2014, the World Cosplay Summit (WCS) announced that Canada would join this international event as an Observer Nation in 2015. Otakuthon was selected as the convention to hold the Canadian Preliminaries for the WCS, starting in 2014. Winners from the Preliminaries at Otakuthon 2014 traveled to Japan to participate in the WCS 2015 events, but not compete in the Cosplay Championship. This was the first time a Canadian cosplay delegation represented the country at this international event, which has been running yearly since 2003.

Since 2016, Canada was eligible to compete in the Championship and earn awards. The Preliminaries to select the team to represent Canada as a full-participating nation were held at Otakuthon 2015, almost a full year in advance. The World Cosplay Summit is generally held from late July to early August, with the 2016 edition held from Sat, Jul 30, 2016 to Sun, Aug 7, 2016. In 2017, the Preliminaries at Otakuthon were moved from Friday evening to Sunday mid-day, and the show was livestreamed to Team Canada's quarters in Nagoya; also that year, the Cosplay Championship was livestreamed to Otakuthon attendees in a special screening room.

== History ==
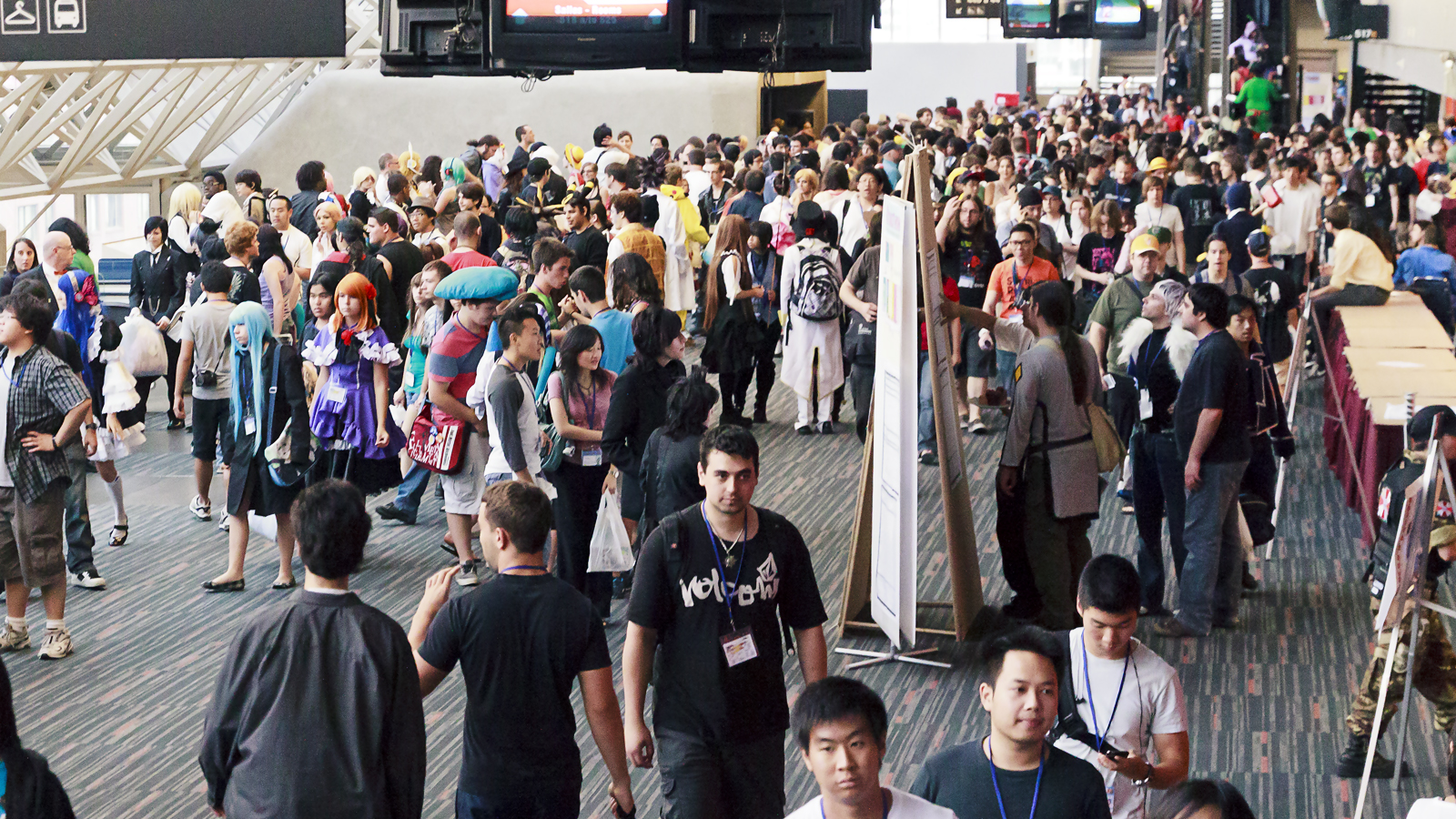
View of the main hallway of the Palais des Congrès during Otakuthon 2011, with some attendees in cosplay

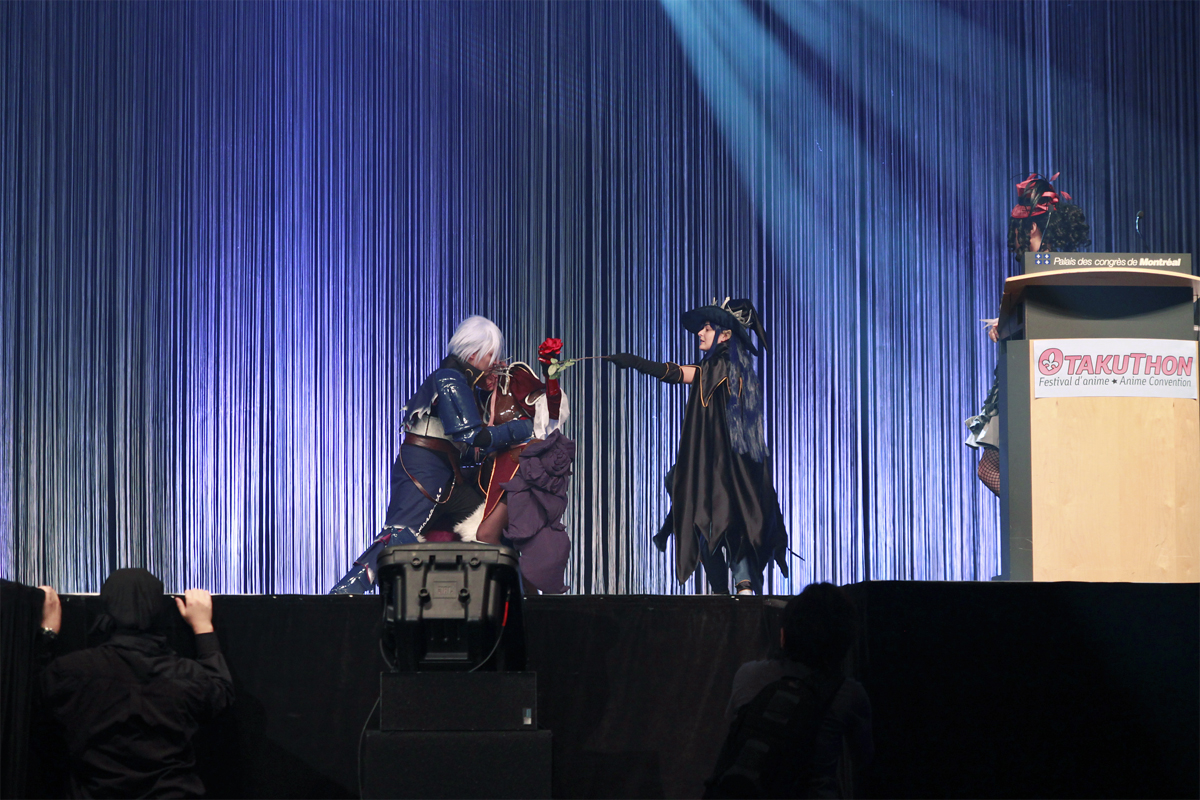
3 contestants perform a skit on stage during the Otakuthon 2011 Masquerade.

Otakuthon evolved from the annual Animethon anime marathon presented by Otaku Anime of Concordia University, held at the Henry F. Hall Building on the Sir George Williams campus. The anime marathon had over the years, used one or several screening rooms, over the course of one or two days, and had included ancillary events. In 2005, the 10th edition of Animethon was renamed Otakuthon. In 2006, Otaku Anime joined with other local anime clubs and individuals to turn the annual anime marathon into a full blown convention.

While convention membership at the 2006 edition was free, admission fees were introduced from 2007 and onwards. There was a pre-registration option for the paid memberships, and attendees who pre-registered could arrive on Friday afternoon to receive their membership badges in order to gain instant access to all convention events on the same day at opening time. Admissions for the Masquerade and J-pop concert were included in the membership fee.

The 2007 edition's outstanding success prompted Otakuthon to move its venue from Concordia University to the Palais des congrès de Montréal convention center in summer 2008. This allowed the convention to increase its capacity, concentrate the main attractions on a single floor instead of multiple floors at the university, as well as free itself from restrictions imposed upon by the institution. In the same year, Otaku Anime and the other anime clubs managing the convention formed the Quebec Anime Committee, Otakuthon's new parent organization.

With a great number of out-of-province Guests invited in 2009, Otakuthon was upgraded from a regional-level convention to a national-level one. 2010 introduced a Thursday evening badge pickup option for pre-registered attendees, which alleviated the long lineups on Friday as well as provided them immediate access to the convention area when the doors opened on Friday afternoon. Year after year, Otakuthon has occupied more and more conference spaces and hallways of the convention center following an annual progressive growth; while in 2008 less than half of the 5th and 7th floors were booked, in 2010 nearly 80% of those floors plus the main exhibition hall of the 2nd floor (for Registration) were open for the convention. In 2017, Registration was moved to Level 1 to make space for expansion of the Exhibition Hall on the 2nd floor. Expansion of exhibit and conference space continued in the following years as the convention continued to maintain a strong growth rate.

Otakuthon has a relatively significant economic impact on Montreal, compared to other similar-sized national-level conventions held at the same location. In 2011, the convention generated an estimated $2,137,157 in economic spinoffs in the city, while in 2010 it generated an estimated $1,606,076.

In 2014, the Quebec Anime Committee became the Otakuthon Cultural Society and continues to manage the convention to this day.

In 2018, Otakuthon started offering VIP passes called Premium Badges. A badge mailout option was also introduced to attendees pre-registering for the convention. The same year, the convention adopted RFID technology for on-site access and exit; each and every badge had an embedded microchip that had to be scanned ("tapped") onto a card reader at any of the convention's multiple entry points, both to access the convention floors and exit the premises. The same technology was used to encode digital concert tickets onto attendees' badges if they purchased them, or refuse entry to individuals who have had their admissions annulled (banned). Staff were present at entry points to assist people entering and leaving the convention, showing them where to scan their badges on the card readers. This limitation on who could enter the main convention area drastically cut down the number of unregistered people and passersby, reducing congestion in the Viger Lobby as well as allowing Otakuthon staff to know exactly the number of people inside the premises in real time.

2019 continued the adoption of RFID badges, encoded with attendees' badge type and purchased concert tickets.

In 2020, Otakuthon was cancelled for the first time due to concerns over the ongoing COVID-19 pandemic. For two years, the convention held 2 online editions where attendees could watch and discuss livestreams featuring staff, guests and performers.

2022 marked the return of Otakuthon in physical format, fully returning at the Palais des congrès de Montréal.

By 2023, Otakuthon passed Toronto's Anime North to become Canada's largest Anime convention in terms of attendance, as Anime North is capped in terms of attendance/ticket sales (whereas Otakuthon is not.)

In 2025, for its twentieth anniversary, Otakuthon transferred all of its paid concerts to the Place des Arts, namely Demon Slayer: Kimetsu no Yaiba in Concert, the Orchestre de Jeux Vidéo, MindaRyn, CODA in concert and SPYAIR. The RFID card reading system malfunctioned temporarily on Friday afternoon at the Viger Lobby entry points but service was quickly restored by technicians.

=== Event history ===
Dates	Venue	Location	Attendance	Guests	Notes
June 10–11, 2006	Concordia University, Sir George Williams campus	Montreal, Quebec	1,872	Boxed Rice Productions, Joany Dubé-Leblanc, Matt Hill, Irulanne, Gisele Lagace, Delphine Levesque Demers, Christopher Macdonald, Sara E. Mayhew, Claude J. Pelletier, Emru Townsend, Sukoshi Yoshi and Tamu Townsend.	First edition. Free admission.
August 4–5, 2007	Concordia University, Sir George Williams campus	Montreal, Quebec	1,946	The 404s, Arashi Daiko, Boxed Rice Productions, Sirkowski, Irulanne, Christopher Macdonald, Les Major, Dawn "Kaijugal" McKechnie, Tim Park, Claude J. Pelletier, Scott Ramsoomair, Lucien Soulban, Mark Sprague, Mandy St. Jean, Sukoshi Yoshi, Venus Terzo.	Change of month from June to August. First year with paid admission.
July 26–27, 2008	Palais des congrès de Montréal	Montreal, Quebec	3,250	The 404s, Maral "Sarcasm-hime" Agnerian, David Coacci, Disorder, Sirkowski, D.S. Gannon, Tiffany Grant, Matt Greenfield, Gisele Lagace, Delphine Levesque Demers, Les Major, Dawn "Kaijugal" McKechnie, Tim Park, Claude J. Pelletier, Lucien Soulban, Spike Spencer, Mark Sprague, Mandy St. Jean, the Ontario Anime Society.	Change of month from August to July. Change of venue from the university to the convention center.
July 31–August 2, 2009	Palais des congrès de Montréal	Montreal, Quebec	5,500	Johnny Yong Bosch, Stephanie Sheh, Kevin McKeever, Pikmin Link, athenaWaltz, The 404s, Claude J. Pelletier, Dawn "Kaijugal" McKechnie, Sébastien "Sirkowski" Fréchette (Miss Dynamite), Maral "Sarcasm-hime" Agnerian.	Convention length increased from 2 days to 2.5 days.
August 13–15, 2010	Palais des congrès de Montréal	Montreal, Quebec	7,310	The 404s, Maral "Sarcasm-hime" Agnerian, David Coacci, Lar DeSouza, Aaron Dismuke, Quinton Flynn, Sébastien "Sirkowski" Fréchette (Miss Dynamite), D.S. Gannon, Caitlin Glass, Jacob Grady, Mohammad "Hawk" Haque, HIMEKA, Irulanne, Kyowa Québec, Stu Levy, JoEllen "Lillyxandra" Elam, Sara E. Mayhew, Dawn "Kaijugal" McKechnie (canceled), Scott A. Melzer, Vic Mignogna, Ananth Panagariya, Claude J. Pelletier, A.E. Prevost, Ryan Sohmer, Mark Sprague, Yume Mirai.	Change of month from July to August. First year with Thursday evening badge pick-up for pre-registered Attendees.
August 12–14, 2011	Palais des congrès de Montréal	Montreal, Quebec	9,520	Haruko Momoi, The 404s, Académie des chasseurs de prime, Maral "Sarcasm-hime" Agnerian, Eric Allard, David Coacci, Leet Street Boys, Lar DeSouza, Crispin Freeman, Maile Flanagan, Sébastien "Sirkowski" Fréchette (Miss Dynamite), Mel Gosselin, MUSEbasement, Jacob Grady, Yaya Han, Karl Kerschl, Dawn "Kaijugal" McKechnie, Scott Melzer, Yume Mirai, Dream Pod 9, Kyowa Quebec, Ryan Sohmer, Robin Sevakis, Mark Sprague.	
August 3–5, 2012	Palais des congrès de Montréal	Montreal, Quebec	11,000	The 404s, Adella, Arashi Daiko, Mel Gosselin, Kyowa Québec, Yuri Lowenthal, Scott McNeil, Matthew Myers, Tara Platt, J. Michael Tatum (canceled), Tomoe Ohmi, Alodia Gosiengfiao, Eric Allard, Académie des chasseurs de prime (ACP), MUSEbasement, Ejen Chuang, Orchestre de jeux video (OJV), Komachi Montreal, Arashi Daiko, Daito Ryu Koryukan, Shidokan Kendo and Iaido Club, Feng Huang Wushu Club, Yokai Project, Tiriel, Daniel Proulx, Dream Pod 9, Hamlet Machine, Anasthasia, Belladonna, Frozen Wings, Morbidollz.	Attendance figures reach over 10,000.
August 16–18, 2013	Palais des congrès de Montréal	Montreal, Quebec	13,357	The 404s, Anasthasia, Ryūsuke Hamamoto, Nadia "NadiaSK" Baiardi, Emirain, En Masse, D.S. Gannon, Benoit Godbout, Mel Gosselin, Jacob Grady, Kyowa Québec, L'orchestre de Jeux Vidéo, Michel Lacombe, Moon Stream, Matthew Myers, A.E. Prevost, Monica Rial, David Vincent (actor), J. Michael Tatum, Veronica Taylor, Yokai Project.	
August 22–24, 2014	Palais des congrès de Montréal	Montreal, Quebec	17,661	The 404s, Shelley Calene-Black, Daito Ryu Koryukan, Feng Huang Wushu Club, Mel Gosselin, Jacob Grady, Yui Ishikawa, Komachi Montreal, Michel Lacombe, Masayuki Ozaki, Raj Ramayya, Arnie Roth, Shidokan Kendo and Iaido Club, Jeff Simpson, Spike Spencer, Nobuo Uematsu, Brett Weaver, E. K. Weaver, Yokai Project, A New World (music from Final Fantasy).	The World Cosplay Summit Canadian Preliminaries arrive at Otakuthon. Spike Spencer becomes the first major Guest to be re-invited to the convention.
August 7–9, 2015	Palais des congrès de Montréal	Montreal, Quebec	20,210	FLOW, angela, Colleen Clinkenbeard, Patrick Delahanty, LeSean Thomas, Carole Thivolle, Elffi, Okageo, Nikita, Rikiya Koyama, Yosuke Okunari, Todd Haberkorn, Wendee Lee, Mel Gosselin, Jeff Simpson, Ben Lo, Jayd "Chira" Ait-Kaci, Christopher Macdonald, Tony Valente, Your Favorite Enemies, Orchestre de Jeux Vidéo, L'Orchestre portable de jeux vidéo (OPJV), The 404s, Komachi Montreal, Daito Ryu Koryukan, Shidokan Kendo and Iaido Club, Feng Huang Wushu Club, Inazuma Daiko, Crunchyroll, FUNimation Entertainment, Aniplex, VIZ Media, Notation, Thomas Lamarre, Martin Picard, Bernard Perron.	Convention length increased from 2.5 days to 3 full days. Thursday badge pick-up opens earlier. Attendance figures reach over 20,000.
August 5–7, 2016	Palais des congrès de Montréal	Montreal, Quebec	21,315	BACK-ON, Atsuko Tanaka, Takeshi Obata, Arina Tanemura, Masanori Miyake, Takamitsu Inoue, Karen Strassman, Eric Stuart, Sam Vincent, Chris Cason, Virchan Puu, Jez, Mel Gosselin, Amya Chronicles, Jayd "Chira" Ait-Kaci, Johannes Helgeson, Joodlez, Ikko, Akidearest, The Anime Man, Misty Chronexia, Noble Lost Pause, The 404s, Arashi Daiko, Orchestre de Jeux Vidéo, L'Orchestre portable de jeux vidéo (OPJV), Pony Canyon, Crunchyroll, FUNimation Entertainment, Sekai Project, 1st PLACE / IA, Bandai Namco Entertainment America, Kiki Jenkins, Emily Willis, Ann Uland.	Otakuthon Idol and the World Cosplay Summit Canadian Preliminaries switch days, with the former now on Friday and the latter on Sunday.
August 4–6, 2017	Palais des congrès de Montréal	Montreal, Quebec	22,065	Man With A Mission, 1st PLACE / IA, Arashi Daiko, L'orchestre de Jeux Vidéo (OJV), Misty Chronexia, The 404s, Kevin Connolly, Daito Ryu Koryukan, Dez, Kara Eberle, Mel Gosselin, Windofthestars, Ayako Kawasumi, Komachi Montreal, Cherami Leigh, Amanda C. Miller, A New World (music from Final Fantasy), Twin Cosplay.	Registration moved to the 1st floor. First year to have paid concerts on all 3 days.
August 3–5, 2018	Palais des congrès de Montréal	Montreal, Quebec	23,226	The 404s, Capcom Live, fhána, Lia, Shiena Nishizawa, Maidreamin, Danny Choo, Jacob Grady, Kyle Hebert, Hirokatsu Kihara, Komachi Montreal, Lauren Landa, Erica Mendez, Erica Schroeder, Ian Sinclair.	Premium Badges now offered. Badge mailout option available for pre-registering attendees. Introduction of RFID chipped badges for on-site access and exit.
August 16–18, 2019	Palais des congrès de Montréal	Montreal, Quebec	25,533		
August 15–16, 2020	Online	Montreal, Quebec	N/A	Moved online. The event had originally been scheduled for 14–15 August 2020 at the Palais des congrès de Montréal.	Moved online due to the COVID-19 pandemic
August 20–22, 2021	Online	Montreal, Quebec	N/A	Moved online. The event had originally been scheduled for 6–8 August 2021 at the Palais des congrès de Montréal.	Moved online due to the COVID-19 pandemic
August 5–7, 2022	Palais des Congrès de Montréal	Montreal, Quebec	29,409		Back to physical edition after a 2-year interruption due to the COVID-19 pandemic
August 11–13, 2023	Palais des Congrès de Montréal	Montreal, Quebec	35,309		First year attendance surpassed Anime North, making Otakuthon Canada's largest Anime convention.
August 2–4, 2024	Palais des Congrès de Montréal	Montreal, Quebec	36,280		
August 8–10, 2025	Palais des Congrès de Montréal	Montreal, Quebec	34,340		Large concerts moved to the Place des Arts, first decrease in attendance
August 7–9, 2026	Palais des Congrès de Montréal	Montreal, Quebec	36,936		

== Other events ==
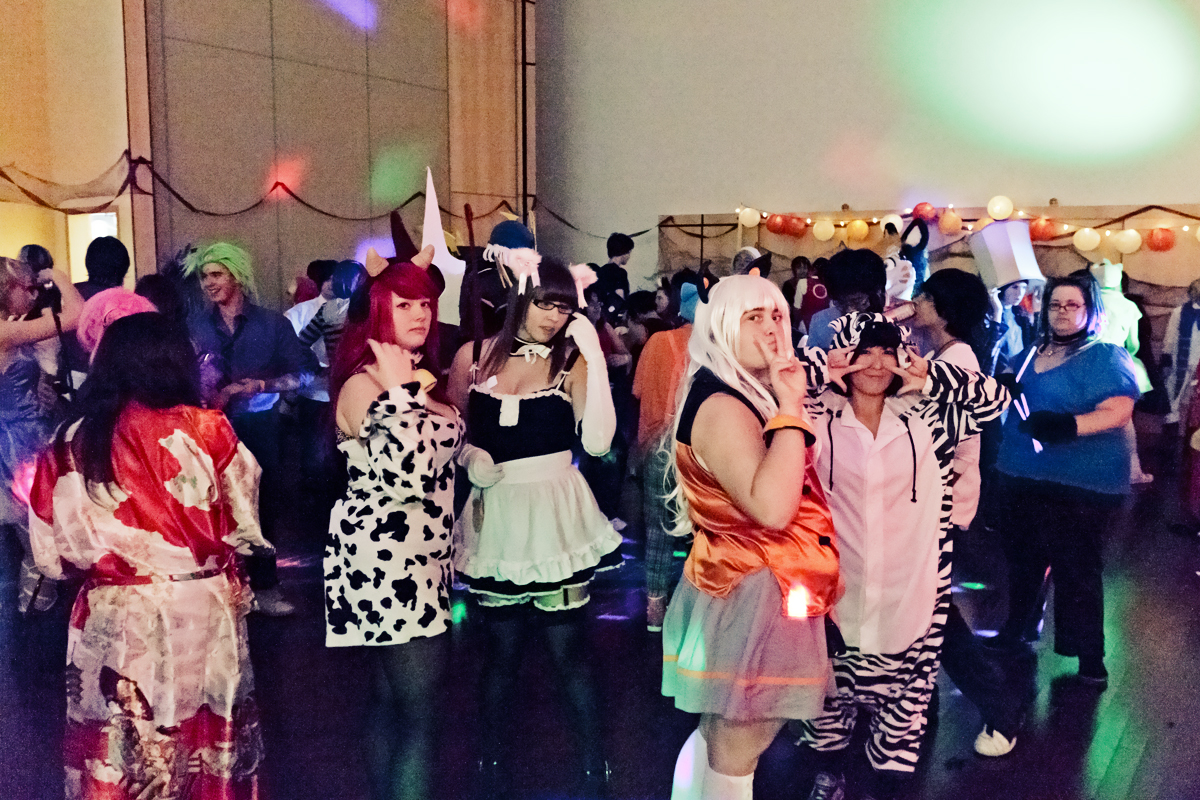
Attendees on the dancefloor at the 2011 Halloween Party

Otakuthon's staff and volunteers also organize events in Montreal other than the main annual convention. Most of the con's staff and volunteers are present at these events.

- From 2008 to 2014, Otakuthon has held an annual Halloween Party on the Saturday before Halloween (in 2025, the Saturday after). It is Montreal's third-largest cosplay event after Otakuthon, behind Montreal Comiccon, and second-largest costumers' gathering on Halloween after La Grande Mascarade. The Otakuthon Halloween Party has changed venue every year in order to accommodate for increasing attendance.
  - Otakuthon Halloween Party 2008 was held at the Coeur des Sciences building of the UQAM.
  - The 2009 Party was held at the Chinatown Holiday Inn Select hotel. The event sold out, resulting in attendees being turned away at the entrance, with some of them coming from afar. As people left, new tickets were sold, and some of those who were turned away came back and were admitted to the party. This prompted the organizers to find a much larger venue for next year's Halloween Party.
  - The 2010 Party was held at L'Espace Réunion reception hall, a much larger venue than 2009's location. New features included skill games and a food service area.
  - The 2011 Party was held at Outremont's Inter-Generational Community Center. It featured more skilled games and a larger food service area. However, no photo booth was installed.
  - The 2012 Party was held again at the same Outremont Community Center, with minor changes and additions. A Halloween-themed wide painted backdrop was available for open photoshoots.
  - In 2013, the Party moved to the larger Centre Jean-Claude Malépart and had minor changes and additions.
  - The same venue was used for the 2014 Party.
  - There was no 2015 Party, as the convention was unable to secure a venue that meets the scheduling, budgetary and logistical requirements involved in running an Otakuthon Halloween Party.
  - After a 10-year hiatus, the Otakuthon Halloween Party returns in 2025. It will be held on 1 November 2025 at Collège Ahuntsic. Due to limited space, pre-registration is required and no tickets will be sold at the door; attendance is capped and ticket sales will stop if the cap is reached.
- In February 2012, Otakuthon hosted a Manga Ball. Held at the Grande Bibliothèque of the Bibliothèque et Archives nationales du Québec, this ballroom-type dance event coincided with Montreal's Nuit Blanche downtown-wide event.

Additionally, they used to organize an annual trip each May to Anime North (AN) in Toronto, Canada's second-largest anime convention. The travel group was open to anyone, not just Otakuthon attendees. The Otakuthon staff and volunteers assigned to this trip, which acted as brokers, received trip signups and trip money from travelers, which was used to reserve charter buses, book hotel rooms and make group registrations for the con. This travel group from Montreal was the largest, single group registration for Anime North, at about 50-100 people depending on the year; 1 or 2 coach buses were hired depending on group size (or 1 coach and 1-2 minivans if a 2nd bus could not be filled).

Otakuthon's annual Anime North trip provided a cost-effective, centrally-managed opportunity for Montrealers to attend AN without the hassle of figuring out every detail of the trip, competing for hotel room bookings, getting together a group large enough to qualify for Anime North's group rate, and determining an itinerary from Montreal to the con's area, which is outside of downtown Toronto, requiring commuting or a taxi ride if the method of transport chosen was by bus or train, which have their terminals downtown. (Car travelers could drive directly to the con, while air travelers could land at Toronto Pearson International Airport, which was next to the con.) Signups for the trip usually opened in January of each year.

The annual Anime North trip is no longer offered most likely because Otakuthon is now Canada's largest anime convention and no longer has a need to promote or organize trips other events. The shift occurred after Otakuthon surpassed Anime North in attendance, allowing it to become the dominant anime convention in Canada, while Anime North has attendance caps on its admission sales, though the abolition of the annual AN trip happened a few years before attaining the No.1 size ranking.

== Mascot ==
Yurika, Otakuthon's mascot

Yurika (pictured on the right), a fictional blue-haired teenage girl, serves as Otakuthon's mascot. She appears under many forms on Otakuthon booklets, badges, website, clothing and other wearables. She was originally created for the convention by local artist Jessie Rong. Yurika has been drawn by various artists over the years and a mascot contest was even once held. Véronique Thibault, Yinyin Liu, Sharyl Chow and Meryem Bahnini were credited in the Otakuthon 2010 program booklet for different versions of the mascot. In 2011, Yurika was joined by her brother Yatsumi, her cousin Yuki, and her friend Yumi.

== Past anime conventions in Montreal ==
There has been 2 other anime conventions held in Montreal, in addition to Otakuthon. They were:

- Montreal Anime Expo, Montreal's first anime convention. Organized by Hobby Star Marketing (HSM) of Toronto, it was held on November 14–16, 2003 at the Palais des congrès de Montréal. The guests of honor were Scott McNeil, Kirby Morrow, Chris Sabat and Brad Swaile. Montreal Anime Expo never returned, and Montreal had no anime convention between 2003 and 2006.
- Daikon, a single-day anime convention held on July 3, 2010, at the Holiday Inn Montreal Midtown. Their Guest of Honor was Linda Hartley, and a portion of the proceeds went to the Montreal Children's Hospital Foundation. This convention also never returned.

== See also ==
- Montreal Comiccon, Montreal's comic book convention
- Anime North, Canada's second largest anime convention
