= Anime North =

Anime fan convention in Toronto, Canada

- Anime North's logo
- Status: Active
- Venue: Toronto Congress Centre; Delta Hotels by Marriot Toronto Airport and Conference Centre
- Locations: Toronto, Ontario, Canada
- Country: Canada
- Inaugurated: August 9, 1997; 29 years ago
- Most recent: May 22, 2026; 6 months ago
- Next event: May 28, 2027; 6 months' time
- Attendance: 34,590 in 2018
- Filing status: Not-for-profit
- Website: http://www.animenorth.com

Anime North (AN) is a not-for-profit, fan-run anime convention, held annually in Toronto, Ontario, Canada. Its major attractions, activities and events include: industry guests, fan-run panel presentations, workshops, video presentations, gaming tournaments, musical performances, dances and cosplay. The show has two shopping areas, an "Artists Alley" for artworks and crafts and a general "Vendors Hall".

The largest anime convention in Canada by attendance numbers, AN is held at the Toronto Congress Centre and the Delta Airport Hotel and Conference Centre, on Dixon Road at Martin Grove, near Toronto Pearson Airport, in the district of Etobicoke.

The convention was initially established in 1997 in Old Toronto. It moved to its current location in 2004 to accommodate its growing popularity. Initially using only a portion of the Congress Centre, it now uses the entire complex.

== Programming ==
Anime North comprises several streams of events:

- panels - discussions and presentations, including fans, cosplayers and industry
- workshops - crafts, clothing and cultural
- performances - opening night concert, idol contest, a musical concert, drag show, anime improv, outdoor dance party
- vendors of anime-related products - a main area for commercial vendors, an "artist alley", and a flea market
- displays - including gundam modelling, art gallery and decorated cars
- guest autographs - voice actors, industry members, cosplayers
- photo opportunities - for cosplay attendees
- charity auction - benefiting The Hospital for Sick Children
- gaming area - both tournament and casual
- video rooms - curated selections of current and historical anime

Current and past Anime North conventsions have included guest speeches, gaming tournaments, dances, art-related workshops, discussion panels, martial arts displays, model contests, Go tournaments, and similar events. The event has also held a contest for cosplay crafting.

The most popular events at Anime North include the Masquerade and the J-Idol competition. Other events include the AMV contest, guest autograph sessions, the All-Star Charity Auction, the Momiji Award (with brunch), Anime Improv, "Super Hardcore Anime Wrestling" (a co-production with Great Canadian Wrestling), Beyblade North (a Beyblade tournament sanctioned by the World Beyblade Organization), and Yaoi North.

Each year, a concert is held, featuring musical performers from Japan. In 2026, the group was "I Don't Like Mondays."

One vendor section is designated Artist Alley, set aside for independent artists and craft products. Pixar director Domee Shi sold prints of her work as a teen.

Hoppouno Momiji, a fictional redhead with a taste for both anime and anything Canadian serves as Anime North's dominant mascot. Momiji's many manifestations are used on all AN clothing, badges, and other wearables. She was originally created for the convention by the Japanese artist Hyi-San.

== History ==
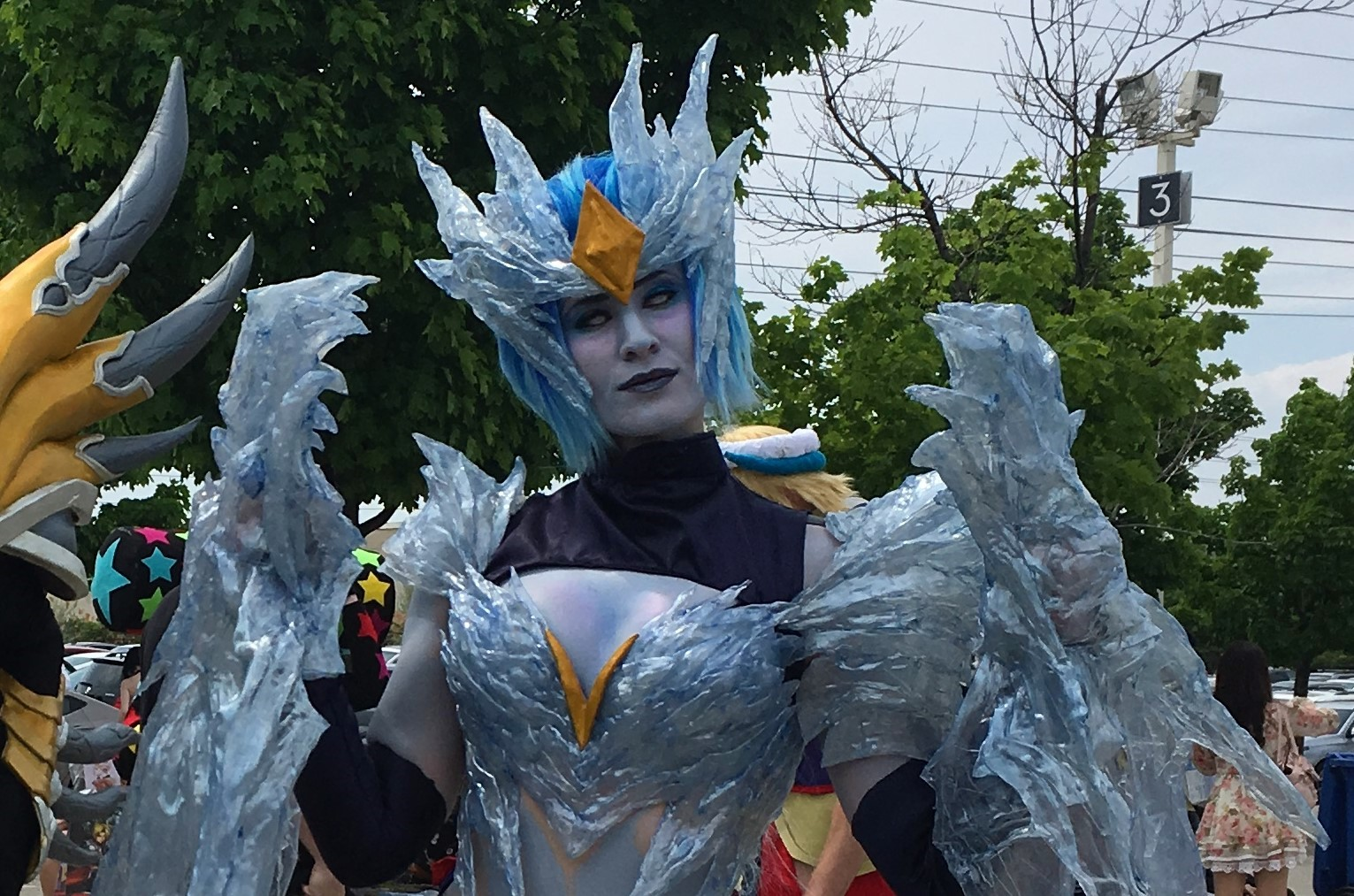
Cosplayer outside of the Toronto Congress Centre, 2018

Anime North was founded in 1997 by Toronto anime fan Donald Simmons, with support from seven anime appreciation fan clubs in Toronto, Hamilton, and Ottawa. Organizers planned for 500 attendees at their one-day event, with approximately 700 attending. The Michener Institute in downtown Toronto featured art, dealers, gaming, costume competition, panels, and trivia. David L. Pulver ran the Bubblegum Crisis: Before and After tournament in the gaming room, as its author.

In 1998 the convention expanded to two days of programming, and 1999 saw the addition of a third day of programming as well as a move to the Ramada Airport East Hotel, with attendance reaching 1,000. Convention organizers programmed the Japanese Anime Film Festival in 2000, which ran weekends for multiple months at Royal Ontario Museum. In 2001 AN was moved to the airport strip near Pearson Airport and was held at the Toronto Airport Marriott (attendance 2,000) and in 2002 moved to the much larger Regal Constellation Hotel (attendance 2,800).

Shortly after the 2003 convention at the Regal (attendance 5,000), the Regal closed and the convention had to find yet another new location. Since 2004, the best combination of function and hotel space available was the combination of the Toronto Congress Centre (TCC) and the nearby Renaissance Hotel in the western district of Etobicoke for additional programming. These two venues were unfortunately a 10-15 minute walk apart, although a free shuttle bus was provided to help alleviate this problem. Despite this difficulty, attendance reached a record 8,200 that year.

In 2005, Anime North added a Thursday evening badge pickup for pre-registered attendees, and changed hotels from the Renaissance to the Doubletree International Plaza Hotel, across Dixon Rd. from the TCC (attendance 9,500). Yaoi North was introduced to the event. Toronto Comic Con was scheduled in April, which observers suggested was intentional, to try and compete with Anime North. In 2006 actual programming was added for Thursday evenings; approximately 12,500 people attended that year, the first time that attendance has broken 10,000 people. AN 2008 was the 12th year of the convention with 13,300 attendees, and continues to grow every year; in 2010, the convention expanded to the Marriott Toronto Airport to host the Friday Moonlight Ball. The front section of the TCC was finally opened to Anime North attendees in 2011 (it was always closed in past years), with rooms made available for Guest of Honor panels, AMV screenings, workshops and toy and model displays. In 2012, the convention expanded to 2 more hotels, the Crowne Plaza Hotel where Go and board gaming were held, and the Radisson Suites Hotel where Café Nocturne and Café Aurora Zero were located, which made in all 5 hotels in the area where Anime North operated, in addition to the Toronto Congress Centre. That year, attendance exceeded for the first time the 20,000 mark, with 22,385 paid attendees.

In 2015, the North Building of the Toronto Congress Centre was opened for Anime North to hold its Main Events room for concerts, the Masquerade and other very large shows. In 2016, the Moonlight Ball moves to a new venue, the Airport Holiday Inn Hotel.

In 2017, the North Building hosted the Conservative Party leadership election at the same time as Anime North.

In 2019, Kaeru Idols were the first idol group to host a live debut and performance at the Anime North Headquarters in Skyline A at the Delta Hotel.

Anime North was cancelled twice due to the COVID-19 pandemic in 2020 and 2021 with virtual events held. The following event took place on July 15–17, 2022, having been pushed back from its usual May scheduling due to Omicron variant.

In 2023, Anime North inaugurated a Friday night flea market, or "nominoichi" in the South Hall. That same year, registration was moved to the North Hall. 2024 was the last year of events held at the Sheraton.

=== Attendance cap ===
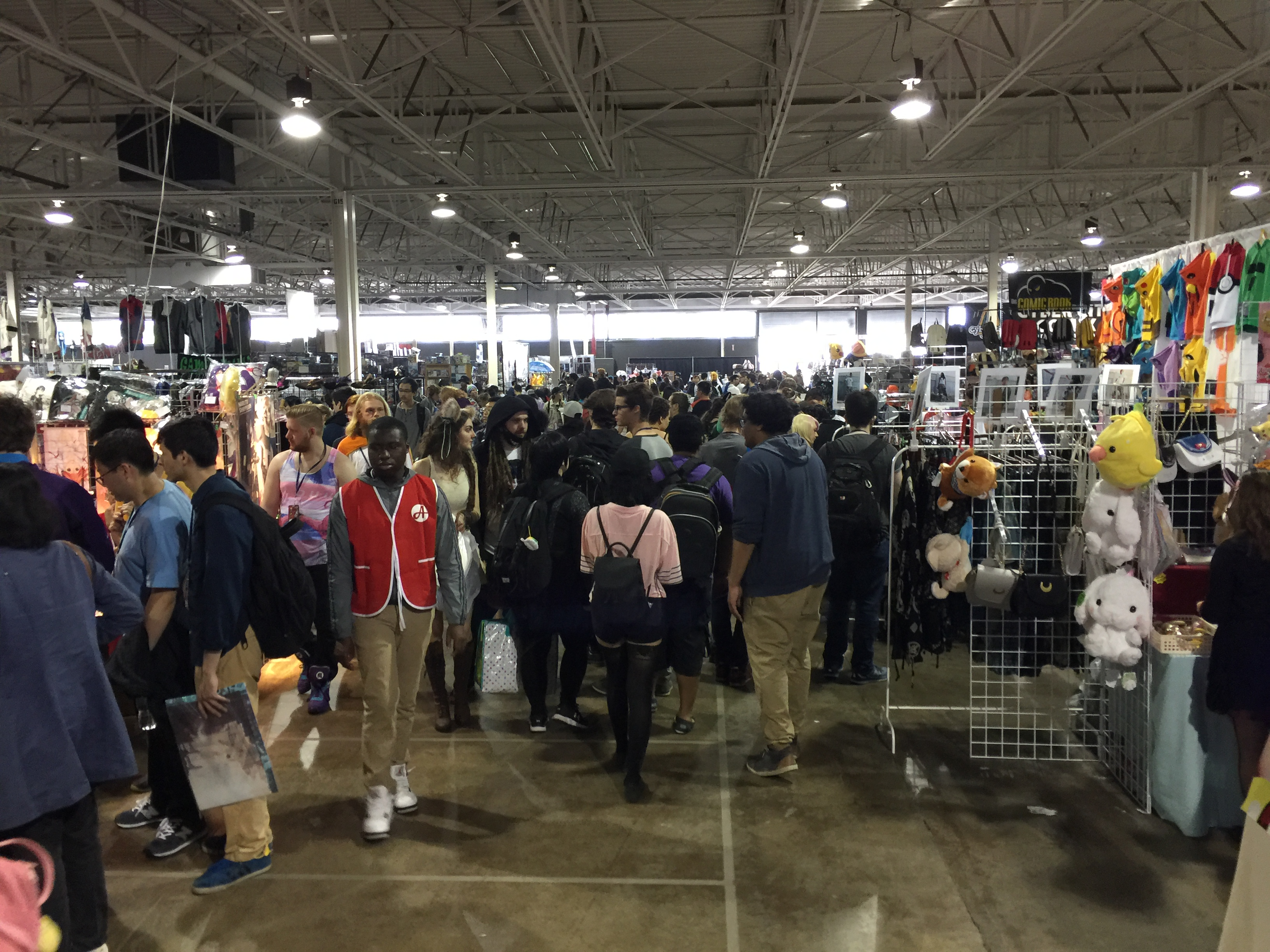
A view of some booths at the event

Anime North has considered implementing an attendance cap to address overcrowding issues. Such a cap was enacted in 2012; a decision made in fall 2011 confirmed it. Citing long lineups and overwork of staff and volunteers as the main reasons for capping attendance in 2012, they countered (compensated) this announcement by proclaiming pre-registration for the con to be opened on January 2, 2012, giving a large amount of time for fans to plan ahead their convention trip.

In 2012, weekend passes sold out and none were available for purchase at the door. The convention had capped the sales of passes to 15,000 full weekend, and 5,000 single day passes for each day.

Anime North 2012 had a daily cap of 20,000 attendees, as did 2015. In 2020, the daily cap was lifted to 38,000 attendees. In 2026, the cap was set at 36,500.

== Convention history ==
Dates	Location	Attendance	Guests
August 9, 1997	The Michener Institute; Toronto, Ontario, Canada	700	Christina Carr, Martin Hunger, David L. Pulver, Geri Bertolo.
August 22–23, 1998	The Michener Institute; Toronto, Ontario, Canada	747	Christina Carr, John DeMita, Martin Hunger, Mark C. MacKinnon, Matt K. Miller, Fred Perry, David L. Pulver, Fred Schodt, Barb Schofield.
June 18–20, 1999	Ramada Airport East Hotel; Toronto, Ontario, Canada	1,200	Christina Carr, Robert DeJesus, Hitoshi Doi, Martin Hunger, Hyi-san, Locke, Mark C. MacKinnon, Pandora Diane MacMillan, Matt K. Miller, David L. Pulver, Barb Schofield, Kenji Shimizu.
June 16–18, 2000	Ramada Airport East Hotel; Toronto, Ontario, Canada	1,001	Steve Bennett, C.B. Cebulski, Colleen Doran, Ben Dunn, Tsukasa Kotobuki, Mark C. MacKinnon, Derwin Mak, Takeshi Miyazawa, David L. Pulver, J. Torres
May 25–27, 2001	Toronto Airport Marriott; Rexdale, Toronto, Ontario, Canada	1,841	Steve Bennett, Stephanie Brown, Keith Burgess, Julie Davis, Ben Dunn, Charlene Ingram, Shimpei Itoh, Fred Ladd, John Martin, Aubry Mintz, Billie Mintz, Mio Odagi, Van Partible, John Pham, Peter Rebelo, Sailor JAMboree, Mark Simmons, Doug Smith.
May 24–26, 2002	Regal Constellation Hotel; Toronto, Ontario, Canada	3,000	Anshin School of Karate, Steve Bennett, Keith Burgess, Julie Davis, Ben Dunn, The Jem Project, David Kaye, Diana Kou, Fred Ladd, Jason Lee, John Martin, Scott McNeil, Sailor JAM-Boree, Mark Simmons, Doug Smith, and Amanda Winn Lee.
May 16–18, 2003	Regal Constellation Hotel; Toronto, Ontario, Canada	4,875	Anshin School of Karate, Steve Bennett, Brian Drummond, Ben Dunn, Saffron Henderson, Mark Hildreth, The Jem Project, David Kaye, John Martin, Miyako Matsuda, Scott McNeil, Hikaru Midorikawa, Frank Miller, Kirby Morrow, Claude J. Pelletier, Stan Sakai, Doug Smith, Brad Swaile, and Kathryn Williams.
May 21–23, 2004	Toronto Congress Centre; Renaissance Toronto Airport Hotel; Toronto, Ontario, Canada	8,500	Steve Bennett, Richard Ian Cox, Michael Dobson, Brian Drummond, Ben Dunn, Atsuko Enomoto, David Kaye, Les Major, Nobuyuki Ohnishi, Moneca Stori, and Studio Udon.
May 27–29, 2005	Toronto Congress Centre; Doubletree International Hotel; Toronto, Ontario, Canada	9,500	Susan Aceron, Rob Bakewell, Trevor Devall, Brian Dobson, Michael Dobson, Paul Dobson, Brian Drummond, Ben Dunn, Hilary Haag, Matt Hill, Lamia, Carl Macek, Les Major, Scott McNeil, Vic Mignogna, Kevin Mowrer, Stan Sakai, Asami Sanada, Rob Travalino, Sam Vincent, and Cathy Weseluck.
May 26–28, 2006	Toronto Congress Centre; Doubletree International Hotel; Toronto, Ontario, Canada	12,500	Steve Bennett, Keith Burgess, Colleen Clinkenbeard, Mark Dillon, Brian Dobson, Michael Dobson, Ben Dunn, Quinton Flynn, Donald Kinney, Sen'no Knife, Kotoko, Lamia, Les Major, Cynthia Martinez, Jeff Nimoy, Tim Park, Scott Ramsoomair, Nekoi Ruto, Sonny Strait, Kathryn Williams, and Tommy Yune.
May 25–27, 2007	Toronto Congress Centre; Doubletree International Plaza Hotel; Renaissance Toronto Airport Hotel; Toronto, Ontario, Canada	13,500	Steve Bennett, Johnny Yong Bosch, Keith Burgess, Svetlana Chmakova, Ben Dunn, Peter Fernandez, Tiffany Grant, Matt Greenfield, Donald Kinney, Wendee Lee, Les Major, Sara E. Mayhew, Alex Milne, Nan Yan, Ryan North, Corinne Orr, Derek Stephen Prince, Scott Ramsoomair, Michelle Ruff, Patrick Seitz, Stephanie Sheh, Spider's Kiss, Sonny Strait, Wire, and ZZ.
May 23–25, 2008	Toronto Congress Centre; Doubletree International Plaza Hotel; Renaissance Toronto Airport Hotel; Toronto, Ontario, Canada	13,300	Yamila Abraham, Steve Bennett, Benoît Cécyre, Camilla d'Errico, Trevor Devall, Mark Dillon, Trevor Devall, Brian Dobson, Ben Dunn, Quinton Flynn, Liana Kerzner, Donald Kinney, Les Major, Nina Matsumoto, Sara E. Mayhew, Alex Milne, Halko Momoi, Jeff Nimoy, Noizytoys, Claude J. Pelletier, Ed the Sock, Spike Spencer, Sonny Strait, Studio Udon, Brad Swaile, and Tara Tallen.
May 22–24, 2009	Toronto Congress Centre; Doubletree International Plaza Hotel; Renaissance Toronto Airport Hotel; Toronto, Ontario, Canada	14,800	Benoît Cécyre, Bukkyo-kai Dance Group, Svetlana Chmakova, Heather Dale, Camilla d'Errico, Karen Dick(cancelled), Ricky Dick, Mark Dillon, Ben Dunn, Jessie Flower, Jess Hartley, Heroes of the World, Mark Hildreth, Nobuyuki Hiyama, Steve Horton, Yuri Lowenthal, Les Major, Vic Mignogna, Nagata Shachu, Tara Platt, Carrie Savage, Malcolm Sheppard, Tara Tallan, and Douglas Tong.
May 28–30, 2010	Toronto Congress Centre; Doubletree International Plaza Hotel; Sheraton Toronto Airport; Marriott Toronto Airport; Toronto, Ontario, Canada	16,800	Christopher Ayres, Greg Ayres, Ricky Dick, Yaya Han, Brittney Karbowski, Jushin Thunder Liger (cancelled), Derwin Mak, Vic Mignogna, Akira "Kiyoshi" Raijin, Micah Solusod, Manabu Soya, John Swasey, David Vincent and Shawn Spears.
May 27–29, 2011	Toronto Congress Centre; Doubletree International Plaza Hotel; Sheraton Toronto Airport; Marriott Toronto Airport; Toronto, Ontario, Canada	19,951	The 404s, Robert Axelrod, Christopher Ayres, Greg Ayres, Brian Dobson, Michael Dobson, Ben Dunn, The Fool, Barbara Goodson, HITT, The iammatthewian Project, Kyle Jones, Helen McCarthy, Miki Narahashi, John Swasey, Kumiko Watanabe and Shawn Spears.
May 25–27, 2012	Toronto Congress Centre; Doubletree International Plaza Hotel; Sheraton Toronto Airport; Marriott Toronto Airport; Crowne Plaza Hotel; Radisson Suites Hotel; Toronto, Ontario, Canada	22,385	The 404's, Adapter, Yuu Asakawa, Christopher Ayres, Steve Bennett, Benoît Cécyre, Julie E. Czerneda, Karen Dales, Ben Dunn, Jim Felker, J.M. Frey, Mac Christian Heywood, Hoshi*Furu, The iammatthewian Project, Benjamin Israel, Adrienne Kress, lix, Les Major, Marlee, Helen McCarthy, The Moonroses, Carli Mosier, Brina Palencia, Pinku! Project, Shelly Tsivia Rabinovitch, Scott Ramsoomair, Rem, Monica Rial, Akira Sasanuma, Elizabeth Schram, Lianne Sentar, DJ Shimamura, J. Michael Tatum, Miranda Tempest, Lee Tockar, Mike Toole, Mayrhosby Yeoshen.
May 24–26, 2013	Toronto Congress Centre; Doubletree International Plaza Hotel; Sheraton Toronto Airport; Marriott Toronto Airport; Crowne Plaza Hotel; Radisson Suites Hotel; Toronto, Ontario, Canada	23,700	AWOI, Linda Ballantyne, Steve Bennett, Chris Cason, Kate Daley, Ben Dunn, Katie Griffin, Ryo Horikawa, Hoshi*Furu, Kevin Lillard, Bruce Mai, Nora Mai, Sarah McNeal, Eriko Nakamura, Trina Nishimura, Tyson Rinehart, Susan Roman, Chii Sakurabi, John Stocker, John Swasey, J. Michael Tatum, Umbrella.
May 23–25, 2014	Toronto Congress Centre; Doubletree International Plaza Hotel; Sheraton Toronto Airport; Marriott Toronto Airport; Crowne Plaza Hotel; Radisson Suites Hotel; Toronto, Ontario, Canada	28,509	Daizystripper, Rose Noire, Linda Ballantyne, Michael Benyaer, Brian Dobson, Michael Dobson, Ben Dunn, Brian Froud, Mai Goto, Katie Griffin, Yumi Hara, Benjamin Israel, Deven Christian Mac, Scott McNeil, Toby Proctor, Susan Roman, Hidekatsu Shibata, John Stocker
May 22–24, 2015	Toronto Congress Centre; International Plaza Hotel; Sheraton Toronto Airport; Marriott Toronto Airport; Crowne Plaza Hotel; Radisson Suites Hotel; Toronto, Ontario, Canada	30,156	Chris Cason, Philip Chandler, Cynthia Cranz, Ben Dunn, Pete Ellison, FancyWyldDead, Midori Fukusawa, Andrew Jackson, Helen McCarthy, Hitomi Nabatame, Neil Nadelman, Chie Nakamura (Saturday&Sunday only), Ray Olubowale, Wendy Powell, RED HANDED DENIAL, Asami Shimoda, J. Michael Tatum, Mike Toole, UCHUSENTAI:NOIZ, Umbrella, Misa on Wheels
May 27–29, 2016	Toronto Congress Centre; International Plaza Hotel; Sheraton Toronto Airport; Crowne Plaza Hotel; Radisson Suites Hotel; Airport Holiday Inn Hotel; Toronto, Ontario, Canada	29,973	The 404s, Akira, Linda Ballantyne, BEARicade, Steve Bennett, Michael Dobson, Brian Drummond, Kevin Duhaney, Charles Dunbar, Ben Dunn, Jill Frappier, Katie Griffin, Yaya Han, Samantha Inoue-Harte, Daniel Kanemitsu, Kurt Lehner, Shaindle Minuk, Miss Messy Mia, Tracey Moore, Neil Nadelman, Jeff Parazzo, Toby Proctor, Barbara Radecki, Reika, Susan Roman, David Ross, Ron Rubin, Asami Shimoda, Akiko Hasegawa, Chika Anzai, John Stocker, Luna Tsukigami, Takeshi Nogami, Niq van der Aa, David Wyldstar, Matenrou Opera
May 26–28, 2017	Toronto Congress Centre; International Plaza Hotel; Sheraton Toronto Airport; Crowne Plaza Hotel; Radisson Suites Hotel; Airport Holiday Inn Hotel; Toronto, Ontario, Canada	32,167	
May 25–27, 2018	Toronto Congress Centre; Delta Hotels by Marriott Toronto Airport; Sheraton Toronto Airport; Crowne Plaza Hotel; Radisson Suites Hotel; Airport Holiday Inn Hotel; Toronto, Ontario, Canada	34,590	Josh Grelle, Jerry Jewell, Micah Solusod, J. Michael Tatum, Kiyono Yasuno, Eric Vale, Dan Salvato, Yoshihide Hirayama, Sayumi Hirata
May 24–26, 2019	Toronto Congress Centre; Delta Hotels by Marriott Toronto Airport; Toronto, Ontario, Canada		Megumi Toda, Yuriko Yamaguchi, The World Standard, Aaron Roberts, Alexis Tipton, Brittney Karbowski, Jamie Marchi, Josh Grelle, Lauren Landa, Mel Colley-Deverel, Paige Gardner, Yuki Kurihara, Mamechiyo, Mieko Ueda
July 15–17, 2022	Toronto Congress Centre; Sheraton Toronto Airport; Toronto, Ontario, Canada		The 404s, Aaron Dismuke, ACME, Jason Anarchy, Benoit Cecyre, Cherry Condos, Christina Carr, Creep-P, D20 Live, D41N, Datarider, DicequeenDi, Disko Warp, DJ Dynamic, Kara Eberle, DJ Davide Ferrara, DJ Flyboy, Hilton George, Caitlin Glass, Pan!c Pop, MC Gobstoppa, Paul Hillier, Fumiko Hoshi, Martin Hunger, Ayane Hylo, Illuminair Entertainment, Ironmouse, Nemurenai Kai, Morgan Lauré, Marvin Mariano, MaxieDaMan, Projekt Melody, Dave Merrill, Moosuki, Neil Nadelman, Nagata Shachu, Niq van der Aa, Haru Nishimura, Nyatasha Nyanners, Hazumi 'Aileen' Okazaki, Oni Giri, Dr. Shelley TSevia Rabinovich, Sakuramai, Samurai Dan & Jillian, Sixtroke, Sophie-chan, Dr. David Stephenson, Katsura Sunshine, Tempest, Virus, Shane Whalley, Maple Winters, Arryn Zech, Zentreya, Xiran Jay Zhao
May 26–28, 2023	Toronto Congress Centre; Sheraton Toronto Airport; Toronto, Ontario, Canada		Blue Clarice, Ghost Girl Goods, Melting Mirror, R.A. Consell
May 24–26, 2024	Toronto Congress Centre; Sheraton Toronto Airport; Toronto, Ontario, Canada	36,847	Fire Lily, Sarcasm-Hime, Spooky Sparkle Party
May 23–25, 2025	Toronto Congress Centre; Delta Hotels by Marriott Toronto Airport; Toronto, Ontario, Canada		Paige Gardner, Fluffy Kawaii Jo, DJ Candikrush
May 22–24, 2026	Toronto Congress Centre; Delta Hotels by Marriott Toronto Airport; Toronto, Ontario, Canada		Gary Chalk, Adam Gibbs, John Gremillion, Rianti Hidayat, I Don't Like Mondays., Honoka Inoue, Kikuko Inoue, Matara Kan, Brittney Karbowski, Alan Lee, Mewlingtea, Carrie Savage, Takahiro Yoshimatsu, Zentreya
May 28–30, 2027	Presumably, Toronto Congress Centre; Delta Hotels by Marriott Toronto Airport; Toronto, Ontario, Canada		Unconfirmed

Note: attendance listed is based on number of paid attendees until Anime North 2016, and on warm bodies as of Anime North 2017.

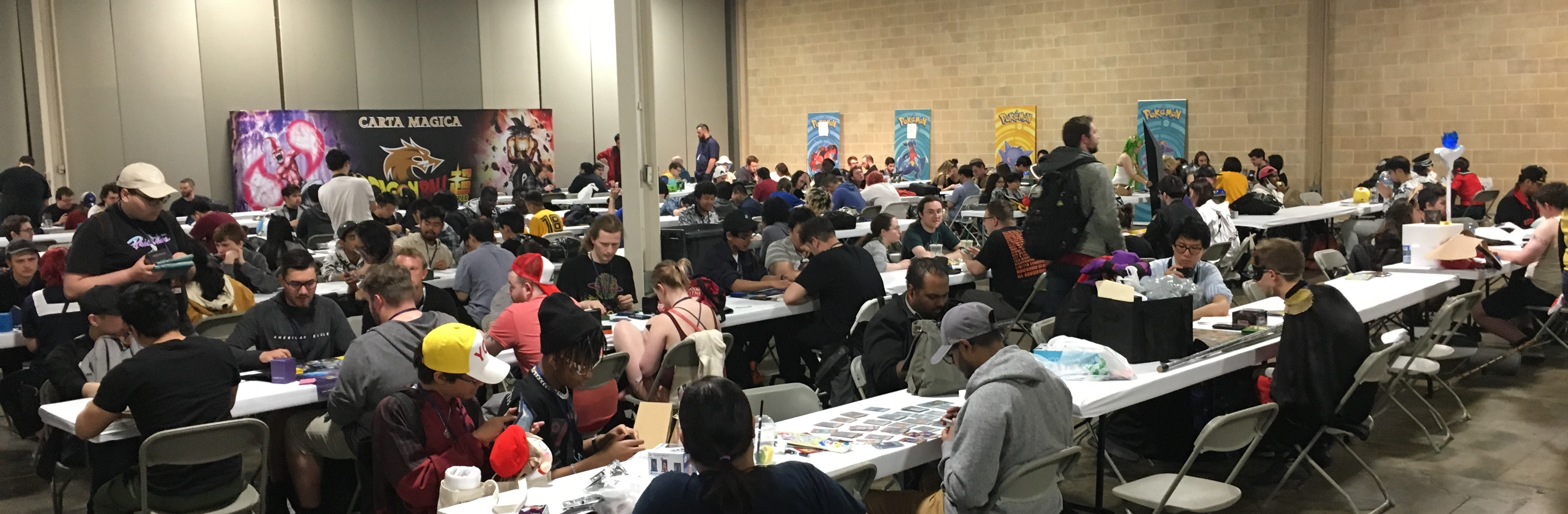
Attendees play tabletop and card games in the gaming hall.

== See also ==
- Anime Revolution
