= Hitoshi Doi =

Website owner

- 土井仁志
- Born: October 17, 1963 (age 62); Chigasaki, Kanagawa, Japan
- Education: University of Chicago (BS); University of Hawaiʻi at Mānoa (MS)
- Occupation: Organizer of the Seiyuu Database
- Years active: 1994–current
- Website: www.usagi.org/doi

Hitoshi Doi (土井 仁志, Doi Hitoshi; born October 17, 1963) is the owner of an English-language anime and voice actor information website, which was established on June 10, 1994.

== Personal website and voice actor database ==
Born in Chigasaki, Kanagawa, Doi got his undergraduate degree in Applied Math at University of Chicago in 1985, and his master's degree in Information and Computer Science at University of Hawaiʻi at Mānoa in 1987. Following college, he worked as a software engineer where he has worked on operating systems. In an interview with Sailor Week, Doi said that the anime that turned him into an otaku fan was Kimagure Orange Road and Sailor Moon. When he was watching, he noticed the voices of many of the characters sounded familiar, and started comparing cast listings from the closing credits. He also learned that the voice actors sing songs, have radio shows and other things. He started collecting the data and created the seiyuu database. On June 10, 1994, he made his website public. Doi said that back then net access meant working in a science or math job, or majoring in that at school.

Doi's personal website contains over 94,000 individual pages, and he is considered to be one of the best known fans of anime and voice acting in the English-speaking world. In addition to personal information, his views on various anime and manga series, and information on his hobbies, Doi's site contains a massive "Voice Actor Database". In 2001, the database contained over 50,000 entries, and it is considered by anime fans to be a definitive source of Japanese voice acting information. In 1998, Mary Grigsby called two of his sites "two of the more informative World Wide Web URL addresses", and used his site as a reference.

Hitoshi Doi was interviewed on CBC's Undercurrents, about the otaku culture.

Doi was a guest of honor at the 1999 Anime North convention in Toronto.
