= Claude J. Pelletier =

French editor and game designer

- Born: May 23, 1962 (age 64); Laval, Quebec
- Education: Université de Montréal
- Occupation: Writer
- Employer: Anime News Network
- Known for: Editor and publisher Protoculture Addicts
- Spouse: Miyako Matsuda

Claude J. Pelletier is the editor and publisher of magazine Protoculture Addicts. He also worked as a game designer primarily on role-playing games.

== Early life and education ==
Claude J. Pelletier was born on 23 May, 1962, in Laval, Quebec. Pelletier studied human sciences and completed his studies at the Collège de Bois-de-Boulogne in 1981. He continued studying history at the Université de Montréal where he earned a bachelor's degree in 1984 and a master's degree in 1987. He began work on a doctorate but did not complete this.

== Career ==
Claude J. Pelletier founded the Montreal-based company Ianus Publications with Yves Meynard, initially to publish historical papers. Pelletier later used Ianus to produce the science-fiction fanzine Samizdat (1986), which he founded with Philippe Gauthier and Yves Meynard, and Pelletier continued to produce Samizdat until 1994. The 1987 edition of L'Année de la Science-Fiction et du Fantastique Québécois complimented Pelletier's writing in Samizdat saying that the writings of others could be dropped from the publication in favor of his.

Pelletier first saw the Robotech television series in 1987, which inspired him to publish a Robotech fanzine called Protoculture Addicts (1987). The first test release of Protoculture Addicts, Issue #0, was published by Pelletier in the fall of 1987. By issue #10, Ianus no longer used their Robotech license and Protoculture Addicts now covered all anime generally, and with this expansion Pelletier brought in graphic designer Pierre Ouellette as a new partner. He has worked at various positions on Protoculture Addicts since 1991, including editor-in-chief, administrative director and production director. Pelletier had considered closing down Protoculture Addicts in 2004, but connected with the Anime News Network in 2005 and renamed it Anime News Network's Protoculture Addicts.

Pelletier translated anime books from Italian, and wrote a guidebook for anime fans. Pelletier and Yves Meynard edited the 1989 anthology Sous des soleils étrangers, which featured eight short stories and one poem from Francophone Canadian science-fiction writers.

Ianus began publishing role-playing games, and in December 1995 the company split into two companies: a new company called Protoculture continued to publish Protoculture Addicts and kept Pelletier and Martin Ouellette of the former Ianus staff, while Dream Pod 9 was now a fully independent company and retained the majority of the dozen employees left from Ianus and also retained the role-playing game titles.

== Awards ==
- 2008: Momiji award at the Anime North convention

== Personal life ==
Pelletier is married to Miyako Matsuda.
