= Toronto Congress Centre =

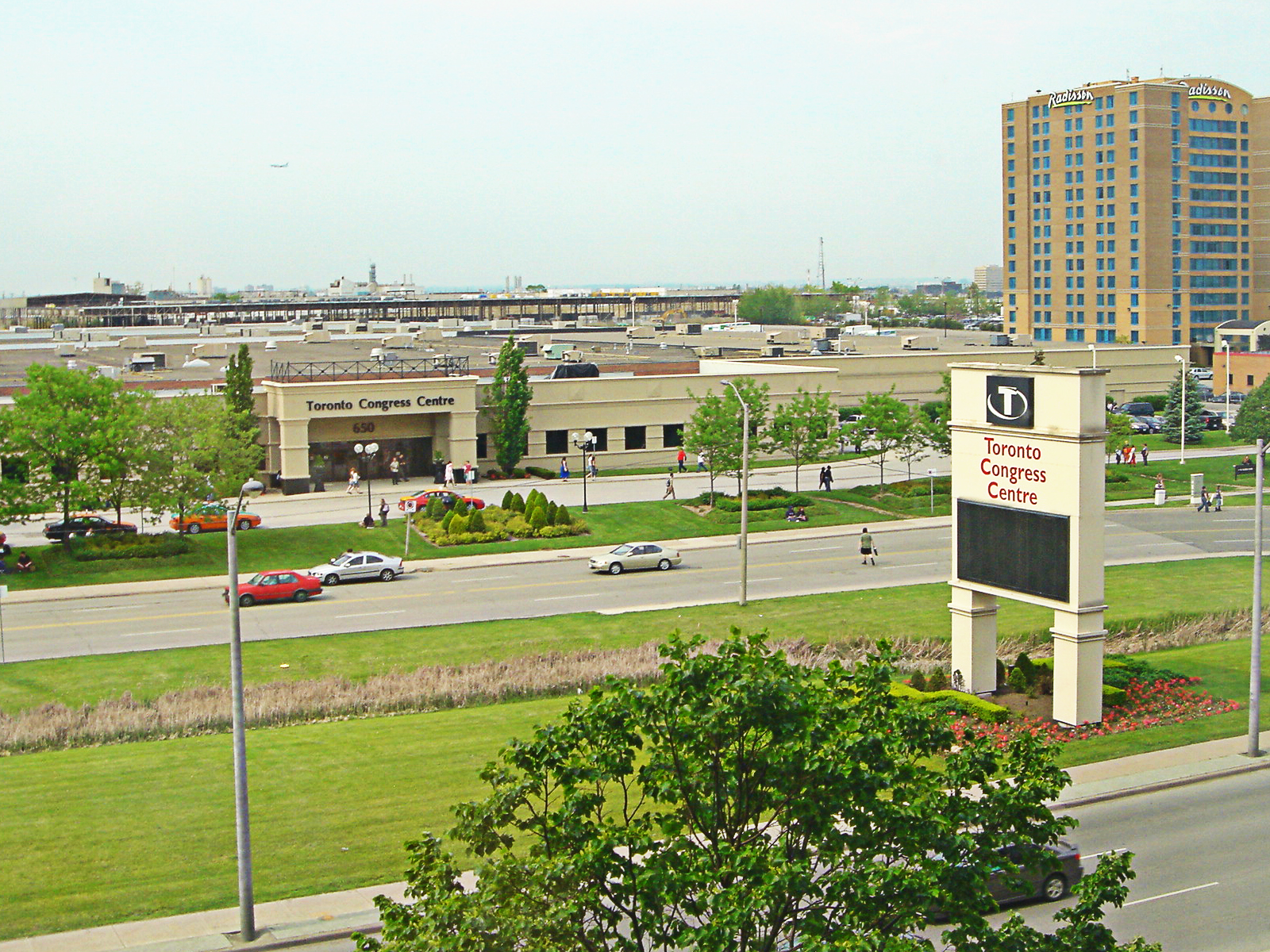
- Main entrance of the Toronto Congress Centre

- Location within Toronto

General information
- Location: 650 Dixon Road; Toronto, Ontario; M9W 1J1
- Coordinates: 43°41′32.17″N 79°34′42.34″W
- Opened: 1995 - original building; 2008 - north building
- Owner: Congress Centres Inc.

Technical details
- Floor area: one million square feet (93,000 m^{2})

Website
- http://www.torontocongresscentre.com/

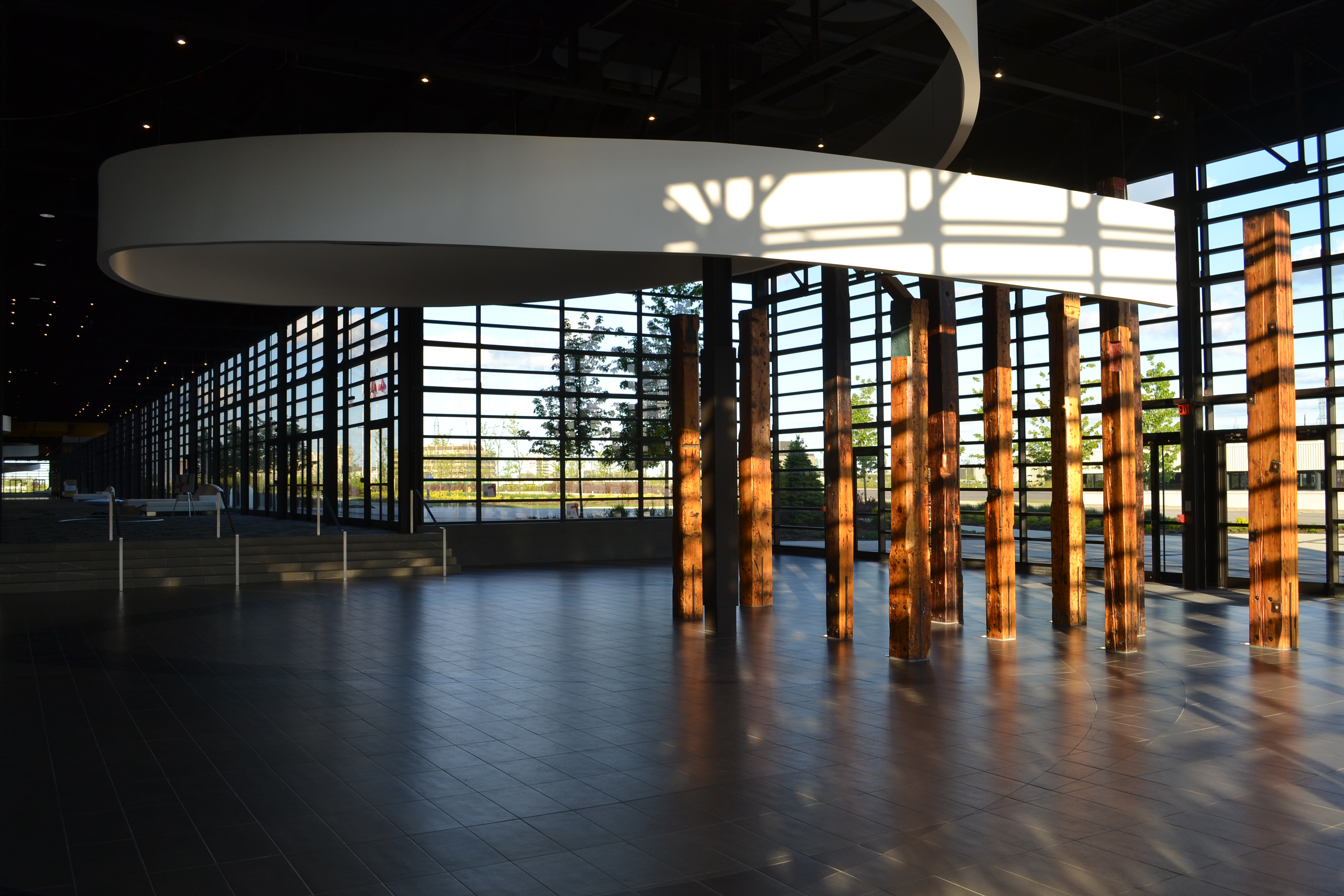
Toronto Congress Centre North Building

The Toronto Congress Centre (TCC) is an event, meeting and trade show complex in the former city of Etobicoke in Toronto, Ontario, Canada, located near Toronto Pearson International Airport. It has over one million square feet (93,000 m^{2}) of exhibition space between two buildings, making it one of the largest facilities of its kind in Canada and North America.

Built in 1995, the Toronto Congress Centre has 60 meeting rooms, two ballrooms (one being pillar-free) and ten divisible exhibit halls. The convention centre is HACCP certified and is one of the only trade and convention facilities in North America to receive this certification, denoting the highest standards in food preparation safety. Their cuisine is prepared in-house by their 5-star Executive Chef and culinary team. Parking is currently free for all attendees.

The TCC opened in 1995 as the largest in Canada, with close to 500,000 square feet (46,000 m^{2}) of exhibit space. However, it was surpassed by the Enercare Centre 1,000,000 square feet (93,000 m^{2}) in 1997, the Metro Toronto Convention Centre (600,000 square feet (56,000 m^{2})) in 1997 and the International Centre (548,000 square feet (50,900 m^{2}) in 2002), following various expansions and renovations at those venues. The TCC has since expanded its exhibit space to over one million sq. ft with the addition of a second building (a vacant industrial building purchased in 2006), north of the current building (referred to as the North Building).

In February 2021, it was announced a site at the centre has been prepared as a large-scale clinic for distribution of the COVID-19 vaccine during the COVID-19 pandemic in Toronto.

== Exhibitions and events ==
Some of the annual or notable events and industry trade shows:

- Anime North - anime fan convention
- The Franchise Show
- Landscape Ontario Congress
- Realtor Quest Trade Show
- Security Canada Central
- store 2016 - Retail Council of Canada industry conference
- Toronto RV Show & Sale
- 2017 Conservative Party of Canada Leadership Election, final candidate showcase and announcement of results

== See also ==
- Enercare Centre in downtown Toronto
- Metro Toronto Convention Centre in downtown Toronto
- International Centre in Mississauga
