= Sous des soleils étrangers =

Anthology published in 1989

Sous des soleils étrangers is an anthology published in 1989.

== Contents ==
Sous des soleils étrangers featured eight short stories and one poem from Francophone Canadian science-fiction writers, and was edited by Claude J. Pelletier and Yves Meynard.

== Reception ==
Jean-Louis Trudel for The New York Review of Science Fiction said that "None of the stories assembled here leaves one indifferent or is merely derivative, and, together, they make up one of the best Quebec anthologies of 1989."
