= Protoculture Addicts =

Canadian anime and manga magazine

- Cover of issue #97, the last regular issue
- Categories: Manga and anime
- First issue: Fall 1987
- Final issue: 2008
- Country: Canada
- Based in: Montreal
- Language: English
- Website: protoculture.ca (archived)

Protoculture Addicts was a Canadian-based anime and manga themed magazine published by Protoculture Inc., an Anime News Network company. The term "Protoculture Addicts" was also used by the Zentradi (an alien race that appeared in the Macross series) to refer to all the races that have been in contact with Protoculture.

Although it was a North American publication, it also covered many things about the state of anime and manga in France and the French-speaking world. Manga and anime are readily available in Europe, and the magazine was started in Montreal, Quebec, a francophone region of Canada with a mixture of French and English speakers.

== History ==
Protoculture Addicts was the first large mainstream anime and manga magazine in North America. Its name derives from the popularity of the Robotech anime series, and its namesake, Protoculture. It started as a Robotech fanzine, became officially licensed as such, and then expanded to cover anime in general. Many of the series that it reviewed and presented details of, including spoilers, were months in advance of legal release in the English-speaking West.

The first test release, Issue #0, was published by Claude J. Pelletier in the fall of 1987. Issue #1 officially launched the fanzine in the spring of 1988. It later became a standard commercial magazine.

=== Acquisition by Anime News Network ===
In 2005, with Issue #82, Protoculture Addicts became Anime News Network's Protoculture Addicts, a sister publication to popular anime news and information website Anime News Network. In May 2006, the first full color issue (#88) of Protoculture Addicts was released with the addition of a manga insert and several changes based on the readers feedback. Issue #89 was published later in end November and returned to its bimonthly schedule.

=== End of regular production ===
The last regularly released issue of Protoculture Addicts was #97, the July/August 2008 edition. This was a symptom of the general collapse of the North American anime market which occurred throughout 2008 following the closure of Geneon USA in September 2007. However, it was also the result of increased competition with anime news websites, such as Anime News Network itself. Only a few months before, Newtype USA shut down in February 2008. This was followed not long afterwards by the closure of Anime Insider magazine in March 2009, the last anime news magazine published on a monthly basis in North America.

The magazine still technically exists, though only as a neglected subsidiary of Anime News Network, and for all intents and purposes it has been directly absorbed by ANN. According to their forum, Anime News Network officially discontinued efforts to release Protoculture Addicts as a regularly released magazine with issue #97, but hoped to continue the name as a bi-annual trade paperback, not focusing on news (a function which had been supplanted by the Internet) but on special features and reviews. However, the project has not been given a high priority, and only two staffers were assigned to gradually produce the special trade-paperback issue, which was still going to be numbered "Protoculture Addicts #98" to continue the legacy of the original magazine. A new issue of Protoculture Addicts had not been published since 2008. This leaves Otaku USA as the only regularly published anime news magazine in North America, which is published on a bi-monthly schedule.

== See also ==
- List of manga magazines published outside of Japan
