= Anime News Network =

Anime news website

- Website type: News and database
- Available in: English
- Headquarters: United States
- Owner: Kadokawa Corporation
- Creator: Justin Sevakis
- Website: www.animenewsnetwork.com
- Commercial: Yes
- Registration: Required for use of forums or contributing information
- Launched: 21 August 1998; 28 years ago
- Current status: Active

Anime News Network (ANN) is a news website that reports on the status of anime, manga, video games, Japanese popular music and other related cultures within North America, Australia, Southeast Asia and Japan. The website offers reviews and other editorial content, forums where readers can discuss current issues and events, and an encyclopedia that contains many anime and manga with information on the staff, cast, theme music, plot summaries, and user ratings.

The website was founded in July 1998 by Justin Sevakis, and operated the magazine Protoculture Addicts from 2005 to 2008. Based in the United States, it has separate versions of its news content aimed toward audiences in five separate regions: the United States and Canada, the United Kingdom and Ireland, Australia and New Zealand, Southeast Asia, and India.

== History ==
The website was founded by Justin Sevakis in July 1998. In May 2000, CEO Christopher Macdonald joined the website editorial staff, replacing editor-in-chief Isaac Alexander. On 30 June 2002, Anime News Network launched its Encyclopedia, a collaborative database of anime and manga titles also including information about the staff, cast, and the companies which were involved in the production or localization of those titles.

On 7 September 2004, the Sci Fi Channel online newsletter Sci Fi Weekly named ANN the Web Site of the Week. On 18 September 2004, the editorial staff at ANN became formally involved with the anime magazine Protoculture Addicts; the magazine began publishing under ANN's editorial control in January 2005.

In January 2007, ANN launched a separate version for Australian audiences. On 4 July 2008, ANN launched its video platform with a library of anime trailers as well as its own news show ANNtv.

On 7 August 2017, a hacker took control of Anime News Network's domain (animenewsnetwork.com), and compromised some of the site's Twitter accounts, including the personal accounts of ANN's CEO Christopher Macdonald and Executive Editor Zac Bertschy. The site was temporarily live at animenewsnetwork.cc until the staff regained control of the original domain. In an article a few days after the loss of the domain, Macdonald published the full story on how the domain was stolen.

On 1 November 2022, Kadokawa Corporation announced an agreement to acquire a majority of Anime News Network's media business through a new subsidiary Kadokawa World Entertainment. Christopher Macdonald, the president of ANN, was appointed as the publisher of Kadokawa World Entertainment. Christopher Macdonald and Bandai Namco Filmworks retain minority shares in the new company.

== Features ==
Anime News Network stories related to anime and manga are researched by the ANN staff. Other contributors, under staff discretion, also contribute news articles.

The website maintains a listing of anime and manga titles, as well as people and companies involved in the production of those titles, which it dubs an "encyclopedia". The site has hosted several regular columns, including a question-and-answer column "Hey Answerman", a review column entitled "Shelf Life", a column on old and forgotten media called "Buried Treasure" written by Sevakis.

ANN also hosts forums, and includes threads to accompany each news item for purposes of discussion. Anime News Network hosts an IRC channel on the WorldIRC network, #animenewsnetwork.
