= Reika =

- Gender: Female

Origin
- Origin: Japanese
- Meaning: Different meanings depending on the kanji used
- Region of origin: Japan

Reika (れいか, レイカ) is a feminine Japanese given name.

== Written forms ==
Forms in kanji include:

- 麗花, "beautiful, lovely, flower, petal"
- 怜華, "wise, beautiful, elegant"
- 令佳, "beautiful, rule, order, excellent"
- 麗夏, "beautiful summer"
- 玲花, "sound of jewels, flower"
- 冷菓, "chilled, cold, sweet, candy"

== People with the name ==
- Reika Hashimoto (橋本 麗香; born 1980), Japanese actress and model
- Reika Iwami (岩見 禮花; born 1927), Japanese artist
- Reika Kakiiwa (垣岩 令佳; born 1989), Japanese badminton player
- Reika Kirishima (霧島 れいか; born 1972), Japanese actress
- Reika Saiki (才木 玲佳; born 1992), Japanese professional wrestler, bodybuilder, singer and idol
- Reika Sakurai (桜井 玲香; born 1994), Japanese idol, singer and actress
- Reika Utsugi (宇津木 麗華; born 1963), Japanese softball player

== Fictional characters ==
- Reika, a character in the OEL manga series Miki Falls
- Reika (レイカ), a character in the anime series Chance Pop Session
- Reika (Jessica), a character in the anime series Stitch!
- Reika, protagonist of the video game Time Gal
- Reika (れいか), a character in Dead or Alive Xtreme Venus Vacation
- Reika Aoki (青木 れいか), a character in the anime series Smile PreCure!
- Reika Ayanokouji (綾小路 玲香), a character in the anime series Battle Skipper
- Reika Chang (Vision), a character in the anime series Bubblegum Crisis
- Reika Hayami (速水 玲香), a character in the manga series The Kindaichi Case Files
- Reika Hazama, a character in the manga series Black Jack
- Reika Houjou (北条 麗華), a character in the light novel series Good Luck! Ninomiya-kun
- Reika Kitakami (北上 麗花), a character in the multimedia series The Idolmaster Million Live!
- Reika Kuze, a character in the video game Fatal Frame III
- Reika Lee (レイカ), a character in the anime series Terminator Zero
- Reika Matsubara (松原 麗架), a character in the visual novel Harukoi Otome
- Reika Mishima (美嶋 玲香), a character in the anime series RahXephon
- Reika Nanjou, a character in the anime series Argevollen
- Reika Nishimura (西村 レイカ), a character in the manga series Sailor Moon
- Reika Rikudou (六導 玲霞), a character in the light novel series Fate/Apocrypha
- Reika Saionji (西園寺 玲華), a character in the anime series Ginga e Kickoff!!
- Reika Saionji (西園寺 レイカ), a character in the manga series Majestic Prince
- Reika Sanjō (三条 レイカ), a character in the anime series Invincible Steel Man Daitarn 3
- Reika Sata (佐田 怜香), a character in the manga series Wolf Girl and Black Prince
- Reika Shimohira (下平 玲花), a character in the manga series Gantz
- Reika Shindai (神代 玲花)/Kamen Rider Sabela, a character in the Japanese tokusatsu drama, Kamen Rider Saber
- Reika Shiragane (白銀レイカ), a character in the anime series Kaiju Girls
- Reika Tachibana (橘 玲佳), a character in the visual novel Baldr Force
- Reika Tama (多摩 レイカ), a character in the manga series Fuuka
- Reika Yamamoto (山本 レイカ), a character in the anime series Serial Experiments Lain
