= I Don't Like Mondays. =

Japanese rock band

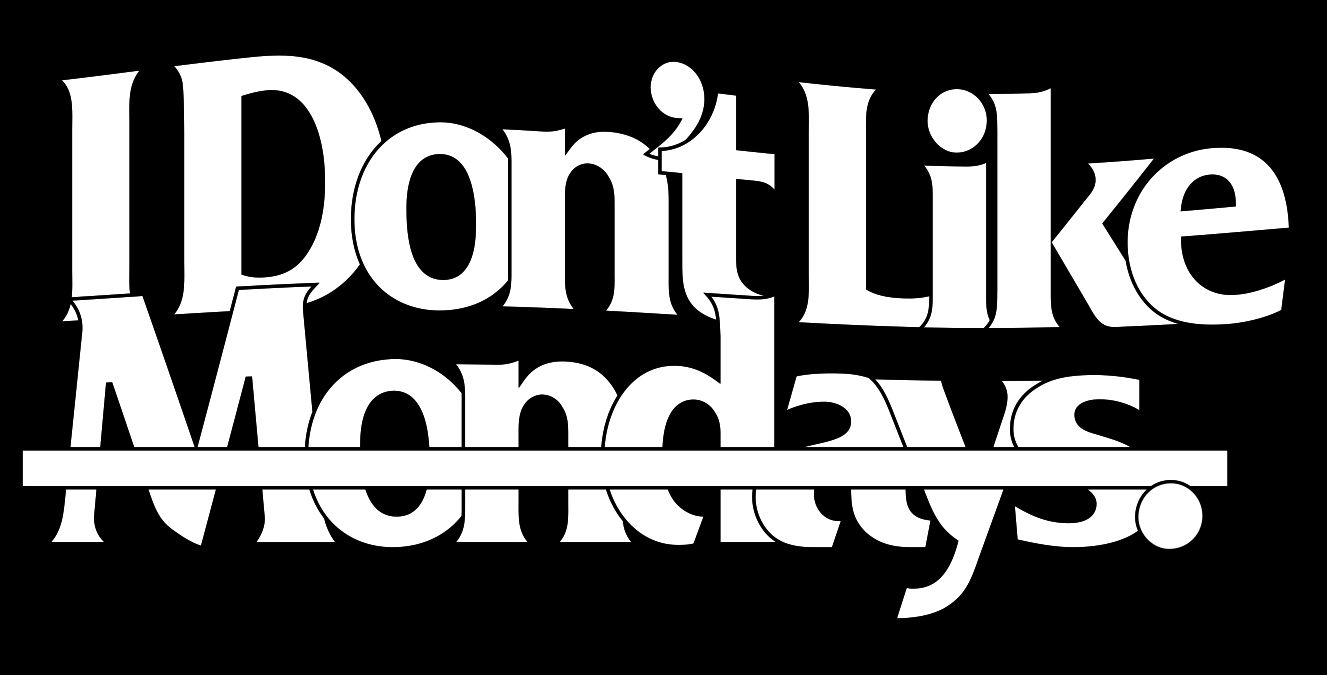
- Band logo

Background information
- Also known as: IDLMs.
- Origin: Japan
- Genre: Rock
- Years active: 2012–present
- Labels: Nippon Columbia (2014–2018); Rhythm Zone (since 2018)
- Members: YU (Vocals); CHOJI (Guitar); KENJI (Bass); SHUKI (Drums)
- Website: idlms.com

I Don't Like Mondays. (IDLMs.) is a Japanese rock band based in Tokyo. The band members are Yu (vocals), Choji (guitar), Kenji (bass guitar), Shuki (drums). Founded in 2012, the band has released several self-produced albums and singles, including the One Piece anime theme song "Paint".

The band focuses on creating high energy dance music with memorable choruses and a light feeling that can take away the burdens of everyday life, including the "Mondays" referenced in their name.

In addition to several tours of Japan, the band has performed internationally at festivals in Jakarta, São Paulo, Taipei, and Barcelona. Their music has been used for the television dramas Rizzoli & Isles and Octo: Mind Investigator Akari Shinno.

The band is also deeply involved in the fashion industry and has collaborated with Versace, H&M, Emporio Armani, and Leslie Kee, among others, along with launching their original fashion brand.

They are signed with Rhythm Zone, an imprint of Avex Group.

== Band members ==
Name	Part	Birthday
Yu	Vocal	February 26, 1988
Choji	Guitar	December 6, 1986
Kenji	Bass guitar	August 13, 1986
Shuki	Drums	July 13, 1988

== History ==
=== Origin of the band name ===
The band name "I Don't Like Mondays." was chosen because the members liked the idea of using a sentence to describe the band. The band has stated that they truly dislike Mondays, and they consider it to be a weekly holiday.

=== 2012–2015: Formation and early albums ===
The band was formed in 2012 in Omotesando, Tokyo. Yu was intending to be the manager of a new band when he met Kenji and Shuki, who had worked together in a previous band. Choji joined after the band's initial guitarist dropped out.

Their first album Play was released in September 2014 by Nippon Columbia, with the band playing a number of festivals the same year, including Tokyo Crazy Kawaii Taipei and J-Music LAB 2014 in Hai Day. The music video for "Perfect Night" was released in July, followed by a remix of the song in December by DJ Baby-T.

In January 2015, they released the double-A-side single "We Are Young"/"Super Special", which included three EDM remixes of previously released songs. The artwork and jacket photo were produced with art direction from the band members, and the single was selected as one of Japan's best singles of the year by Keisuke Kuwata. "Super Special" was chosen as the ending theme for the Japanese broadcast of the American crime drama series Rizzoli & Isles.

The band's second album Tokyo was released in July 2015. For the album jacket, the band was photographed by Leslie Kee. The track "Final Destination" was used as the ending theme for the second season of Rizzoli & Isles. In June, IDLMs. provided music for the "Nippon Genki Project 2015 Super Energy!!" fashion show produced by Kansai Yamamoto. The band performed their first solo concert at Shibuya WWW on October 25.

In September 2015, the band produced a single titled "The Independent", which was used for Leslie Kee's short film The Independents with fashion designer Yohji Yamamoto.

=== 2016–2021: Fashion, Future, and Black Humor ===
The band released their third album Fashion in September 2016. Google Play Music in Japan used "Freaky Boy" from the album in their advertisements, and the song "Tonight" was featured as the ending theme for the TBS late-night music television program Count Down TV. They launched their first national tour in October and performed a solo concert at Zepp DiverCity in Tokyo on November 19.

In June 2017, the band released the E.P Summer, which included a dance remix of "Tonight". The limited edition release also contained 11 live videos from the 2016 Japan tour and the final performance at Zepp DiverCity.

In August 2019, their fourth album Future was released, which was the first album under new label Rhythm Zone. The album contained new mixes of "Tonight" and "Fire" created for the release, and the special edition Blu-ray featured a documentary of the band's recent tours and their decision to change labels. Leading up to the album's release, the band performed the new song "Diamond" for the first time at the Join Alive festival in Hokkaido on July 13. The music video for "Diamond" premiered on July 13, with the band members' wardrobe provided by H&M.

IDLMS. released their fifth album Black Humor in August 2021. During the songwriting phase for the album, Yu composed his lyrics with piano to develop the melody simultaneously. A collaboration with UK fashion brand AllSaints was presented to promote the album's launch.

Following Black Humor's release, the band launched a nationwide tour of Japan, performing their largest number of shows in a single tour.

=== 2022–present: One Piece and international activities ===
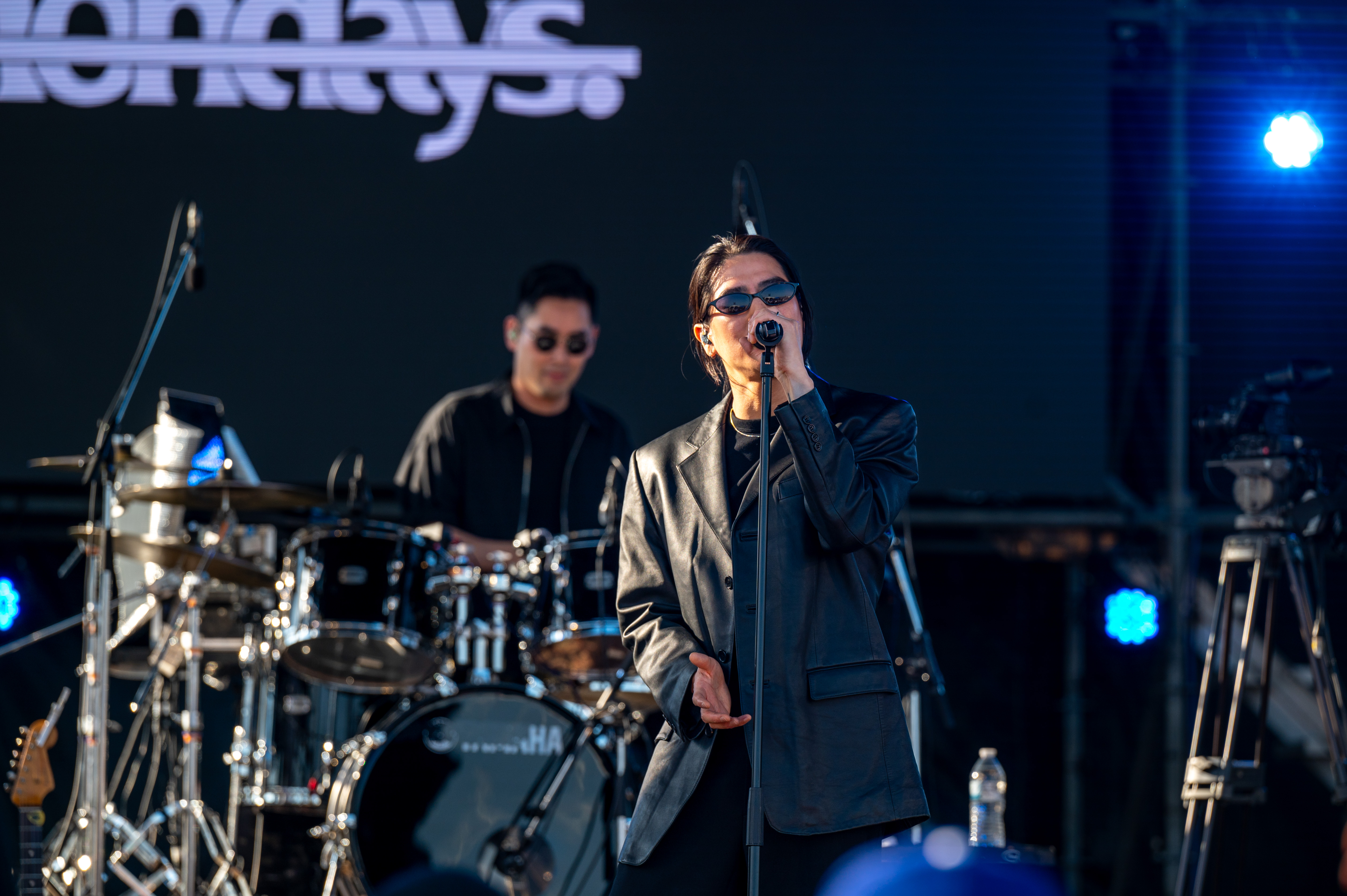
I Don't Like Mondays. performing at Kadena Air Base in 2025

in January 2022, the band released "Paint", which was used for the opening of the One Piece anime. Yu stated an affinity for the series, claiming it was the only manga he has kept reading childhood, and used the teamwork aspect of his own band as inspiration. To prepare for the song's creation, Yu corresponded with One Piece creator Eiichiro Oda to express his thoughts about the series' theme of overcoming adversity.

In July, they performed at the Anime Friends event in São Paulo, Brazil. That same month, their song "Kasaneiro" was used as the theme song for the Japanese television drama Octo: Mind Investigator Akari Shinno.

In February 2023, their songs "Moon Night" and "Wolf Vibes" were used as the opening and ending themes for the TV drama Zenryoku de, Aishite Ii Kana? starring Nanami Sakuraba. On July 2, 2023, they performed at the BubblePop festival in Barcelona, Spain.

In April 2024, they released the 10th anniversary single "New York, New York".

== Music production and visual style ==
=== Musical style ===
Yu writes lyrics in both English and Japanese. The band has noted that the sound of their early recordings was based on international influences, incorporating soul, disco, and pop. The members have cited a range of influences including Katy Perry, Bruno Mars, Kanye West, The Beatles, Oasis, and Peter Gabriel. Beginning with 2021's Black Humor, the band made a conscious decision to focus more on the Japan's domestic J-Pop audience.

=== Music production ===
The band collaborates equally on song creation, using digital technology to share ideas and build each track remotely when they are not in the studio together. Bass and rhythm for the chorus are created first, and then the melody is added. The band will often reference popular trends in music to decide the overall mood and style of a song.

=== Art and stage direction ===
The band directly supervises the look of their live shows, promotion videos, CD jacket art, and band photos.

In 2021, Shuki and Yu collaborated on the artwork and animated promotion videos for Black Humor.

== Fashion ==
Launched an original brand "IDLMs by I Don't Like Mondays.". After the launch, they collaborated with a Japanese original brand shop "And A" and started a collaborated brand called "And A by I Don't Like Mondays.". In September 2016, they announced a collaboration with a Japanese apparel shop Restir and launched "IDLMs. Creative Direction by Restir Edition". They performed at a fashion show of Kansai Yamamoto.

In 2015, IDLMs. created the soundtrack for Leslie Kee's short film The Independents, which featured the Yohji Yamamoto 2015 A/W Collections. The band also appeared in the film.

In April 2019, IDLMs. collaborated with Adidas for the "Do Ya?" music video and presented a performance event in September with AllSaints as part of Vogue Fashion's Night Out.

In October 2020, IDLMs. became brand ambassadors for British watch brand Henry London. Emporio Armani provided the band's wardrobe for the music vdeo "Millennials - Just a Thought".

The track "Shape of Love" was used to promote H&M's first original campaign (Happy Golden Week) in Japan. They also performed in the promotional movie for this campaign shot by Leslie Kee.

== Live ==
YEAR	TITLE
2015	Tokyo 2015
2016	Tokyo 2016
2016	"Fashion" 1st Tour
2017	IDLMs. Joint Gig Tour Guests: Keishi Tanaka / Paellas / Unchain / Vickeblanca
2018	2018 A/W Tour "A Girl in the City"
2019	Future" Tour
2021	Black Humor Tour
2022	Black Thunderbird Tour
2023	Billboard Live Tour 2023
2023	2023 A/W Tour "Runway"

== Discography ==
=== Single ===
YEAR	TITLE	TRACK LIST	Note
2015	We Are Young / Super Special	We Are Young; Super Special; Memories (pal@pop Remix); Perfect Night (pal@pop Remix); Golden Life (Graves + K-smooth Remix)	
2015	Girlfriend (Digital Single)	Girlfriend	
2016	Sorry	CD; Sorry; Girlfriend; Sorry (minus one); Girlfriend (minus one) DVD; Tokyo Brothers (from "Tokyo 2015"); Super Special (from "Tokyo 2015"); Fire (from "Tokyo 2015"); We Are Young (from "Tokyo 2015"); Perfect Night (from "Tokyo 2015")	
2016	Tonight	Tonight; Life; Sing (electric version); Tonight (minus one); Life (minus one)	
2017	Prince (Digital Single)	Prince	
2017	My Girl (Digital Single)	My Girl	
2018	One Thing feat. Salu	One Thing feat. Salu	
2018	Lemonade	Lemonade	
2018	One Thing feat. Salu (Baby-T Remix)	One Thing feat. Salu (Baby-T Remix)	
2019	Do Ya?	Do Ya?	
2019	Zero Gravity	Zero Gravity	
2019	Up to U	Up to U	
2019	Gift	Gift	
2020	Plastic City	Plastic City	
2020	Zenbu Anata no Sei Nanda (全部アナタのせいなんだ)	Zenbu Anata no Sei Nanda (全部アナタのせいなんだ)	
2020	Sunflower	Sunflower	
2020	Monster (モンスター)	Monster (モンスター)	
2020	Mr. Clever	Mr. Clever	
2020	Entertainer	Entertainer	Nishiogikubo Mitsuboshi Yoshudo TV drama theme song
2020	Tokyo Extra (東京エキストラ)	Tokyo Extra (東京エキストラ)	
2020	Millennials -just I thought- (ミレニアルズ 〜just I thought〜)	Millennials -just I thought- (ミレニアルズ 〜just I thought〜)	
2021	Sunflower (Acoustic Live Ver.)	Sunflower (Acoustic Live Ver.)	
2021	Mr. Clever (Acoustic Live Ver.)	Mr. Clever (Acoustic Live Ver.)	
2021	Entertainer (Acoustic Live Ver.)	Entertainer (Acoustic Live Ver.)	
2021	Chijo wo Yumemiru Sakana (地上を夢見る魚)	Chijo wo Yumemiru Sakana (地上を夢見る魚)	Henry London 2021 S/S image song
2021	Ai Kotoba (愛言葉)	Ai Kotoba (愛言葉)	
2021	Baka (馬鹿)	Baka (馬鹿)	
2021	Ongaku no ni ni (音楽のように)	Ongaku no ni ni (音楽のように)	"Do you still swear love?" TV drama theme song
2021	Utsukushiki Sekai (美しき世界)	Beautiful World (Utsukushiki Sekai)	
2022	Paint	Paint	One Piece anime's 24th opening song
2022	Sora no Ao ni Misarete (空の青さにみせられて)	Sora no Ao ni Misarete (空の青さにみせられて)	TBS "Marutto! Saturday" April ending theme
2022	Honne	Honne	
2022	Yoroi	Yoroi	
2022	Kasaneiro (重ね色)	Kasaneiro (重ね色)	Octo ~Emotional investigator Akari Kono~ TV drama theme song
2022	Lonely Zombie Wonderland (ロンリーゾンビーワンダーランド)	Lonely Zombie Wonderland (ロンリーゾンビーワンダーランド)	
2022	Scroll. (Arranged by tofubeats)	Scroll. (Arranged by tofubeats)	
2022	Dynamite (ダイナマイト)	Dynamite (ダイナマイト)	
2023	Wolf Vibes	Wolf Vibes	Will You Let Me Love You With All My Heart? TV drama theme song
2023	Mmm...	Mmm...	
2023	Umbrella	Umbrella	sloggi special collaboration campaign tie-up song
2023	Summer Ghost	Summer Ghost	
2023	What’s going on? feat. Celina Sharma	What’s going on? feat. Celina Sharma	
2024	New York, New York	New York, New York	

=== Album ===
YEAR	TITLE	TRACK LIST
2014	Play	Memories; Perfect Night; Don't Stop Your Music; Bang!! Golden Life; Badman
2015	Tokyo	Fire; We Are Young; Tokyo Brothers; Sing; Star Drive; Feeling; Love Yourself; Super Special; Perfect Night; Final Destination; Memories; Road
2016	Fashion	CD; Introduction; Crazy; Don't look back Game Over; Sorry; Marry me Right before sunset Tonight; Fashion; Stranger; Girlfriend; Freaky boy Life; Memories (Acoustic ver.) *Bonus Track; The Independents *Bonus Track DVD; Sing (Music Video); Love Yourself (Music Video); Girlfriend (Music Video); Sorry (Music Video); Tonight (Music Video); Crazy (Music Video); Sorry (another edition); Behind the scene
2019	Future	FUTURE - Introduction; DIAMOND; DO YA? UP TO U ZERO GRAVITY; LEMONADE; AITAI; A GIRL IN THE CITY; PLEASE; CALL ME; TONIGHT - Future Ver. TRY FOR YOU; FANCY GIRL
2021	Black Humor	Black Humour; MR. CLEVER 地上を夢見る魚; MONOPOLY; Norari Kurari; MOON NIGHT; Its all your fault Fool; Sunflower; Words of Love; Cactus; Gift; Plastic City; Monster; Entertainer; Tokyo Extra; Millennials (Just I thought)
2023	RUNWAY	Umbrella Summer Ghost Beautiful Chaos Strawberry Night Conversation Sin City Mmm... WOLF VIBES Dynamite PAINT

=== E.P. ===
YEAR	TITLE	TRACK LIST
2017	Summer	On my way Shape of love Prince; Tonight (Ksuke Remix); Tokyo Brothers (Live mix); Memories (Live mix); Don't look back (Live Mix); On my way(Live mix)
2018	A Girl in the City	One Thing feat. Salu Lemonade So Bad A Girl in the City Freaky Boy (Shuki Remix) One Thing feat. Salu (Ksuke Remix)
