= Les Major =

English footballer

Personal information
- Full name: Leslie Dennis Major
- Date of birth: 25 January 1926
- Place of birth: Yeovil, England
- Date of death: 2001 (aged 74 or 75)
- Place of death: Derby, England
- Position: Goalkeeper

Senior career*
Years	Team	Apps	(Gls)
1947–1949	Leicester City	26	(0)
1949–1956	Plymouth Argyle	75	(0)
Total		101	(0)
- * Club domestic league appearances and goals

Leslie Dennis Major (25 January 1926 – 2001) was an English footballer who played as a goalkeeper.

He played schoolboy football in Loughborough for Brush Sports, where he was spotted by representatives of Leicester City. He spent two years with the club, making 26 league appearances, before joining Plymouth Argyle on a free transfer as back-up to Welsh international Bill Shortt. He made 23 appearances in his first four seasons with the club, including two in their 1951–52 Third Division South championship winning season. Shortt retired from League football in 1956, and it seemed likely that Major would become the club's first-choice goalkeeper but he was forced to retire from the game that year through injury. He made 78 appearances in all competitions during a seven-year stint with Argyle. He died in Derby in 2001.

== Honours ==
Plymouth Argyle

- Football League Third Division South: 1951–52
