= Skeptic (American magazine) =

Science education magazine

- Premiere issue, featuring a tribute to Isaac Asimov
- Editor-in-Chief: Michael Shermer
- Categories: Skeptical magazine
- Frequency: Quarterly
- Circulation: 40,000 subscribers
- Publisher: The Skeptics Society
- First issue: Spring 1992
- Company: Millennium Press
- Country: United States
- Based in: Altadena, California
- Language: English
- Website: Skeptic.com
- ISSN: 1063-9330

Skeptic, colloquially known as Skeptic magazine, is a quarterly science education and science advocacy magazine published internationally by The Skeptics Society, a nonprofit organization devoted to promoting scientific skepticism and resisting the spread of pseudoscience, superstition, and irrational beliefs. First published in 1992, the magazine had a circulation of over 40,000 subscribers in 2000.

== History, format and structure ==
The magazine was co-founded in late 1991 by Michael Shermer and Pat Linse as they formed the Skeptics Society. The magazine was first published in early 1992. It is published through Millennium Press. As of July 2021, Shermer remained the publisher and editor-in-chief of the magazine. The magazine's co-publisher and art director was Pat Linse, until her death in July 2021. Other noteworthy members of its editorial board include, or have included, evolutionary biologist Richard Dawkins, Pulitzer Prize-winning scientist Jared Diamond, magician and escape artist turned educator James “The Amazing” Randi, actor, comedian, and Saturday Night Live alumna Julia Sweeney, professional mentalist Mark Edward, science writer Daniel Loxton, Lawrence M. Krauss and Christof Koch. Skeptic has an international circulation with over 40,000 subscriptions and is on newsstands in the U.S. and Canada as well as Europe, Australia, and other countries.

The cover story of the magazine's first issue paid tribute to scientist and science-fiction writer Isaac Asimov. According to Shermer, Asimov died when the issue was going to print, so artist Linse produced a pencil portrait of the author. As Asimov wrote a number of stories featuring robots and coined the term "robotics", the cover of volume 12, #2 (2006), which is devoted to the topic of artificial intelligence, depicts a robot sitting on a park bench reading that first issue.

Every issue of the magazine opens with a description of The Skeptics Society and its mission statement, which is to explore subjects such as creationism, pyramid power, Bigfoot, pseudohistorical claims (as in the examples of Holocaust denial and extreme Afrocentrism), the use or misuse of theory and statistics, conspiracy theories, urban myths, witch-hunts, mass hysterias, genius and intelligence, and cultural influences on science, as well as controversies involving protosciences at the leading edge of established science, and even fads like cryonics and low-carb diets. In addition to publishing the magazine, the Society also:

- sponsors lecture series at the California Institute of Technology
- produces and sells tapes of the lectures, as well as other books on pertinent subjects
- holds field trips to investigate and research such subjects
- conducts social events to promote good-will
- provides resources for the public, skeptic organizations (such as SkeptiCamp) and the media, with which they may approach controversial subjects from a skeptical viewpoint

In 2011, the magazine had three regular columnists: James Randi wrote "'Twas Brillig…", Harriet A. Hall wrote "The Skep Doc" and Karen Stollznow wrote "Bad Language". The magazine's page count was between approximately 100 and 110 pages until the 2010s. It was reduced to approximately 80 pages with Vol. 16 No. 3 (2011). As of 2018, the magazine had two regular columnists: Harriet A. Hall and Carol Tavris.

In 2021, the magazine's 100th edition, Vol. 26 No. 2 included a retrospective of over 40 years of Skeptic artwork and covers by Linse and Loxton.

=== Topics ===
Each issue features an editorial. In the past this was provided by James Randi, and was often a reaction to stories from mainstream news media such as the 2005 story by the ABC newsmagazine Primetime Live featuring a Brazilian faith healer, João Teixeira. Other times Randi wrote about topics he had investigated in the past, such as alleged dowsers, alleged psychics like Sylvia Browne, and UFOs.

The magazine also features a large correspondence section called "Forum". This includes not only letters from lay readers but also in-depth comments and rebuttals from professionals, contributing to extended academic debate across issues raised in past editions.

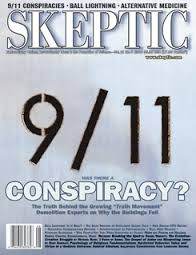

The bulk of the magazine treats a variety of topics. Cover stories have ranged from examination of alleged UFOs in religious icons and theories of the likelihood of artificial intelligence to tributes to influential skeptics including Isaac Asimov and Ernst Mayr. Some editions feature special sections devoted to a particular topic or theme that is examined through multiple articles by different authors, such as intelligent design.

=== Junior Skeptic ===
Bound into most issues is a 10-page young-readers' section called Junior Skeptic. Heralded by a cover printed on glossy paper (the rest of the magazine is printed on non-glossy stock), Junior Skeptic focuses on one topic, or provides practical instruction written and illustrated in a style more appealing to children.

Daniel Loxton is the Editor of Junior Skeptic. He writes and illustrates most issues.

The first edition of Junior Skeptic appeared in volume 6, #2 of Skeptic (2000).

== Official podcasts ==
In April 2006, an independent, skeptical talk program called Skepticality was relaunched as Skepticality: The Official Podcast of Skeptic Magazine. New episodes of the show are released on a biweekly basis. The show is produced by the original, continuing show hosts (Robynn McCarthy and Derek Colanduno) in collaboration with staff of Skeptic magazine.

In 2009, a second official podcast was added. MonsterTalk critically examines the science behind cryptozoological and legendary creatures, such as Bigfoot, the Loch Ness Monster and werewolves. Monster Talk is hosted by Blake Smith and Karen Stollznow, and previously Ben Radford. Blake Smith produces the show.

== Collections ==
- Paranormal Claims: A Critical Analysis, 2007, edited by Bryan Farha, University Press of America, ISBN 978-0-7618-3772-5. Several of the chapters are reprints of Skeptic articles.
- The Skeptic Encyclopedia of Pseudoscience, a collection of articles that discuss the Skeptics Society's scientific findings of investigations into popular pseudoscientific and supernatural claims.

== Editorial board ==
The editorial board is composed of the following people:

- Arthur Benjamin
- Roger Bingham
- Napoleon Chagnon
- K.C. Cole
- Richard Dawkins
- Jared Diamond
- Clayton J. Drees
- Mark Edward
- George Fischbeck
- Gregory Forbes
- John Gribbin
- Christof Koch
- Lawrence M. Krauss (former)
- William McComas
- Leonard Mlodinow
- Richard Olson
- Donald Prothero
- Nancy Segal
- Eugenie Scott
- Julia Sweeney
- Frank Sulloway
- Carol Tavris
- Stuart Vyse

== See also ==
- Critical thinking
- FactCheck
- Freethought
- Pseudoscience
- Scientific skepticism
- Skeptical Inquirer
- SkeptiCamp
- Skepticism
- Snopes.com
- The Freethinker journal
- The Skeptic's Dictionary
- The Skeptic (UK magazine)
- The Straight Dope
