= MonsterTalk =

Skeptical podcast

- Genre: Science, interview
- Language: English

Creative team
- Created by: Blake Smith

Cast and voices
- Hosted by: Blake Smith; Karen Stollznow

Production
- Production: Blake Smith
- Length: 45–80 minutes

Publication
- Original release: July 2, 2009
- Provider: Monster House, LLC

Related
- Website: www.monstertalk.org

MonsterTalk is an audio podcast that was originally presented by the Skeptics Society's Skeptic magazine but broke ties in 2019. Since 2019 it has been an independent podcast under the "Monster House, LLC" banner. The show critically examines the science behind cryptozoological creatures, such as Bigfoot, the Loch Ness Monster, and werewolves. It is hosted by Blake Smith and Karen Stollznow, and produced by Blake Smith. In 2012, MonsterTalk was awarded the Parsec Award for the "Best Fact Behind the Fiction Podcast".

== History ==
The first episode was released on July 2, 2009, and featured an interview with NYU Professor Todd Disotell about the attempted use of DNA evidence in cryptozoologists' search for Bigfoot.

MonsterTalk interviews scientists and investigators that research cryptozoological claims. The show has covered an extensive array of monsters and cryptids, including zombies, demons, ninjas, the Mothman, Cthulhu, the Skookum cast, the Patterson–Gimlin film, the Minnesota Iceman, the Chupacabra; and extinct animals such as pterosaurs, plesiosaurs, and the thylacine.

Guests of the show have included Phil Plait, Professor PZ Myers, Steven Novella, magician James Randi, author Brian Regal, writer and illustrator Daniel Loxton, and investigator Joe Nickell.

== In the media ==
In 2011, Curt Holman conducted an interview with MonsterTalk's producer, Blake Smith, for an article in Creative Loafing. Ghostly Talk radio interviewed the Monster Talk crew in 2009. Blake Smith and Karen Stollznow were also interviewed on the podcast/radio show Skeptically Speaking on May 7, 2010. MonsterTalk is rebroadcast on WPRR in Grand Rapids, Michigan.

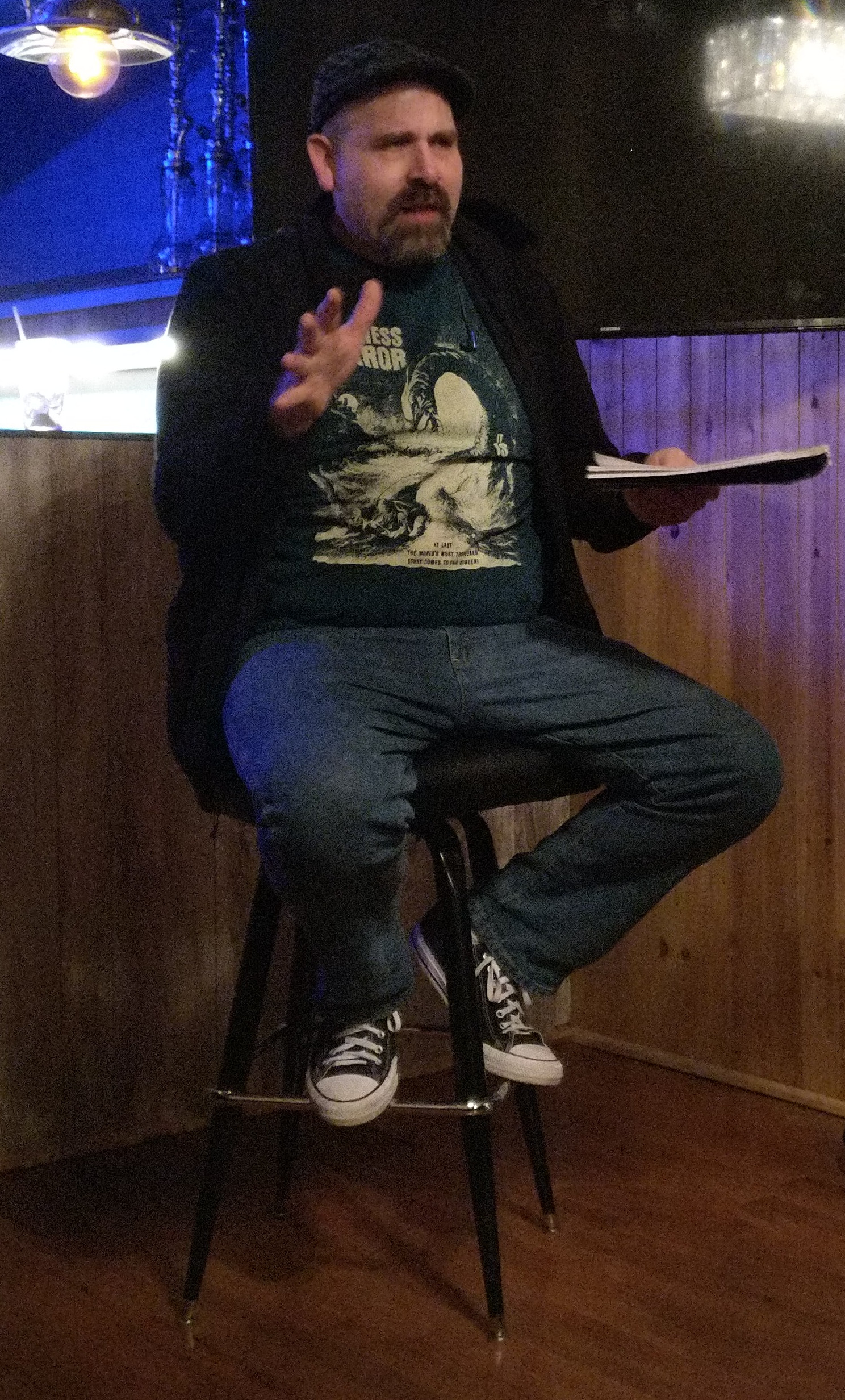
Co-host Blake Smith speaking in March 2018

== Awards ==
MonsterTalk was nominated for a Parsec Award in 2010 and again in 2011.

MonsterTalk won the 2012 Parsec Award for "Best Fact Behind the Fiction Podcast", for programs that "explore the facts that influence the fictions—the science, history, culture, and mythology that inspire these stories."

== See also ==
- Skeptic (U.S. magazine)
- The Skeptics Society
- Cryptozoology
- Cryptids
