= The Skeptic Encyclopedia of Pseudoscience =

2002 book by Michael Shermer

- Cover of the first edition
- Editors: Michael Shermer; Pat Linse
- Language: English
- Subject: Pseudoscience
- Publisher: ABC-CLIO
- Publication date: November 14, 2002
- Publication place: United States
- Media type: Print (Hardcover)
- Pages: 903
- ISBN: 1576076539
- OCLC: 50155642
- Dewey Decimal: 503 21
- LC Class: Q172.5.P77 S54 2002
- Preceded by: How We Believe: The Search for God in an Age of Science
- Followed by: Denying History

The Skeptic Encyclopedia of Pseudoscience is a two-volume collection of articles that discuss the Skeptics Society's scientific findings of investigations into popular pseudoscientific and supernatural claims. It has been called "a 2-volume set with an attitude [...] a skeptical one". The editor, Michael Shermer, director of the Skeptics Society, pulled together articles originally published in Skeptic magazine with some conceptual overviews and historical documents to create this two-volume encyclopedia. Pat Linse is listed as a contributing editor. It was published by ABC-CLIO in 2002.

The encyclopedia has five sections. The first volume is composed of alphabetical write-ups on the scientific view of pseudoscientific concepts such as the "Bermuda Triangle and dowsing, Shroud of Turin and Feng Shui, spiritualism and biorhythms, placebo effect and graphology, Alien abductions and UFOs, crop circles and astrology", followed by a section of investigations and discussions. The second volume explores such subjects in more depth with sections containing case studies, "for and against" essays, and historical documents. This final section has been criticized for containing only five documents.

== Reception ==
Tom Gilson in Against the Grain has some positive comments about the encyclopedia: "[T]he treatment afforded the topics covered in this encyclopedia is serious ... The Skeptic Encyclopedia of Pseudoscience is one of those sets in which the fascination value may equal its reference use ... without a doubt, many people are captivated with the issues discussed in this work." However, he also is of the opinion that the final section is too brief and should be either extended or removed. Gilson questions the price of the volumes, given that “…at least half of the content is reprinted from Skeptic Magazine.” He does however recognise that “The contributors are fully identified and many are academics with advanced degrees.”

The American Reference Books Annual says that: "A careful reading ... should be required of all who wish to get a university degree ... In the Internet age ... people ... should make every effort toward two goals: To spread good scientific methods for evaluating truth claims, and to help nurture enlightened traditional worldviews. ... This set does much in the direction of achieving the first goal."

== See also ==
- Scientific skepticism
- Skeptic's Dictionary
- An Encyclopedia of Claims, Frauds, and Hoaxes of the Occult and Supernatural
