= The Skeptics Society =

American nonprofit organization

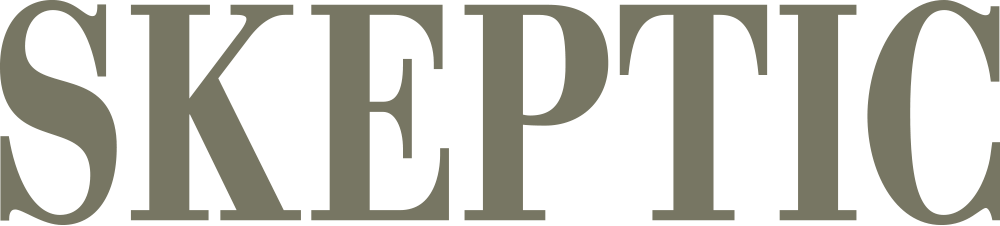
- Formation: 1992; 34 years ago
- Type: Nonprofit
- Location: Worldwide
- Members: c. 50,000 (magazine circulation)
- Executive director: Michael Shermer
- Publication: Skeptic; Junior Skeptic; Skepticality; Skepticblog; INSIGHT
- Website: skeptic.com

The Skeptics Society is a nonprofit, member-supported organization devoted to promoting scientific skepticism and resisting the spread of pseudoscience, superstition, and irrational beliefs. The Skeptics Society was co-founded by Michael Shermer, Kim Ziel Shermer and Pat Linse as a Los Angeles-area skeptical group to replace the defunct Southern California Skeptics. After the success of its Skeptic magazine, introduced in early 1992, it became a national and then international organization. Their stated mission "is the investigation of science and pseudoscience controversies, and the promotion of critical thinking."

== History ==
In late 1991, the Skeptics Society was co-founded by Michael Shermer and Pat Linse, in Los Angeles with the assistance of Kim Ziel Shermer. For the first five years, Shermer and Linse worked on the Skeptics Society out of Shermer's garage. The Skeptic Society formed after a scandal forced an earlier group known as the Southern California Skeptics to dissolve.

In 1996, the Los Angeles Times reported that Shermer, Linse, and Ziel Shermer walked on a bed of hot coals in Altadena, California in a demonstration to show that their ability was natural rather supernatural in origin. By 2000, Shermer stated that the Society's magazine, Skeptic, had a circulation of 40,000. As of 2017, the Wall Street Journal reported that the Society itself had 50,000 members.

Shermer stated as context for the founding of Skeptic Society:

The modern skeptical movement is a fairly recent phenomenon dating back to Martin Gardner’s 1952 classic, Fads and Fallacies in the Name of Science. Gardner’s copious essays and books over the past four decades debunking all manner of bizarre claims, coupled to James “the Amazing” Randi’s countless psychic challenges and media appearances throughout the 1970s and 1980s (including 36 appearances on The Tonight Show), pushed the skeptical movement to the forefront of public consciousness. The philosopher Paul Kurtz helped create dozens of skeptics groups throughout the United States and abroad, and his Committee for the Scientific Investigation of Claims of the Paranormal (CSICOP) inspired me to found the Skeptics Society and Skeptic magazine...

Explaining the organization's name, the Society states:

Some people believe that skepticism is the rejection of new ideas, or worse, they confuse 'skeptic' with 'cynic' and think that skeptics are a bunch of grumpy curmudgeons unwilling to accept any claim that challenges the status quo. This is wrong. Skepticism is a provisional approach to claims. It is the application of reason to any and all ideas—no sacred cows allowed. In other words, skepticism is a method, not a position. Ideally, skeptics do not go into an investigation closed to the possibility that a phenomenon might be real or that a claim might be true. When we say we are 'skeptical,' we mean that we must see compelling evidence before we believe.

== Activities ==
=== Skeptic Magazine ===
The Skeptics Society publishes Skeptic magazine, a quarterly magazine that examines fringe science and paranormal claims, available by subscription or on major newsstands in the U.S. and Canada. Its cover stories have included examination of alleged UFOs in religious icons, theories of the likelihood of artificial intelligence, and tributes to its role models such as Isaac Asimov and Ernst Mayr. Some editions feature special sections devoted to a particular topic or theme that is examined through multiple articles by different authors, such as intelligent design and alternative medicine. The Skeptics Society also publishes eSkeptic, a weekly email newsletter on skeptical topics. The society hosts a website with information on skepticism-related topics and provides information to the media about such topics.

=== Junior Skeptic ===
Bound into most issues is a 10-page young-readers' section called Junior Skeptic which first appeared in 2000 in volume 6, #2 of Skeptic magazine. Junior Skeptic focuses on one topic, or provides practical instruction written and illustrated in a style more appealing to children. The editor of Junior Skeptic was Daniel Loxton, who writes and illustrates most issues. The section stopped appearing in 2021 following the death of Skeptic co-founder Pat Linse.

=== Skeptic Research Center ===
The Skeptic Research Center (SRC) launched in July 2020 as a way to survey peoples' attitudes about divisive issues. The results of each survey study are released through a series of brief reports (i.e., digestible single-topic analyses) through eSkeptic and on the Skeptic website. As of November 2021, the SRC has released 19 reports and the center’s work has been cited in the Wall Street Journal and the Manhattan Institute for Policy Research.

=== Podcasts ===
The Skeptics Society distributes two podcasts, Skepticality and MonsterTalk. Skepticality, adopted as the group's official podcast, promotes critical thinking and science. It was listed by iTunes as a top-rated audio talk show in 2016. Each episode is an audio magazine featuring regular segments by contributors who are specialized in specific areas of critical thought followed by featured content which is, usually, in the form of an interview with a researcher, author, or individual who is helping promote skeptical thought and/or science. MonsterTalk is a podcast that critically examines the science behind cryptozoological (and legendary) creatures, such as Bigfoot, the Loch Ness Monster, or werewolves. Hosted by Blake Smith and Dr. Karen Stollznow, MonsterTalk holds interviews with scientists and investigators. It received "The Best Fact Behind Fiction" award in 2012 from the Parsec Awards.

=== Blogs ===
Until 2014, the Skeptics Society's blog was Skepticblog. In 2014, they started their new blog called INSIGHT, with the editor as Daniel Loxton.

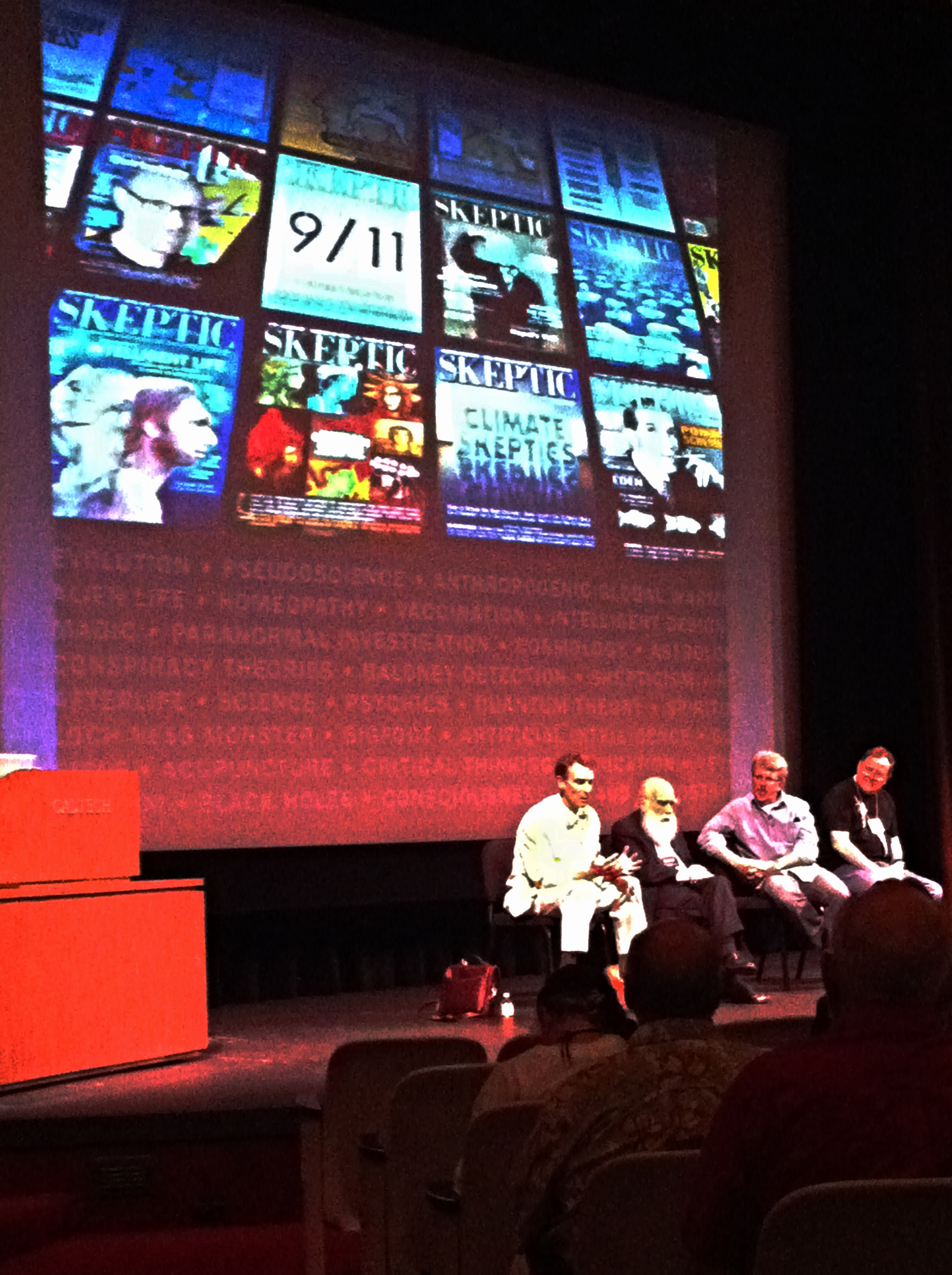
Symposium Panel, 2011

=== Lecture series ===
The Skeptics Society sponsors a lecture series at the California Institute of Technology. The Caltech Lecture Series offers speakers on a wide range of topics relating to science, psychology, social issues, religion/atheism, skepticism, etc. Past speakers include Julia Sweeney, Richard Dawkins, Philip Zimbardo, Dinesh D'Souza, Steven Pinker, Carol Tavris, and Sam Harris. The lectures occur on Sunday afternoons, and are open to the public for a nominal fee.

The Skeptics Society hosted the "Origins Conference" in October 2008 with Nancey Murphy, Hugh Ross, Leonard Susskind, Sean Carroll, Paul Davies, Stuart Kauffman, Christof Koch, Kenneth R. Miller, Donald Prothero, and Victor J. Stenger.

On 24–26 June 2011 the organization also hosted the Science Symposium, speakers included: Michael Shermer, James Randi, Bill Nye the Science Guy and Mr. Deity (Brian Keith Dalton).

On 29–31 May 2015 Skeptic Society hosted In the Year 2525: Big Science, Big History, and the Far Future of Humanity. Speakers included: Richard Dawkins, Jared Diamond, Lawrence Krauss, Esther Dyson, John McWhorter, Ian Morris, Carol Tavris, Gregory Benford, David Brin, Michael Shermer, and Donald Prothero.

=== Reading Room ===
The Reading Room is a library containing a growing index of articles, reviews and opinion editorials culled from their archives, offering a look into the subjects the Skeptics Society has explored over the years.

=== School curriculum resources ===
The Curriculum Resource Center is a free repository of resources for teaching students how to think skeptically.

== Notable editorial board members (past and present) ==
- Roger Bingham
- Napoleon Chagnon
- K.C. Cole
- Richard Dawkins
- Jared Diamond
- Mark Edward
- George Fischbeck
- John Gribbin
- Christof Koch
- Lawrence M. Krauss
- Leonard Mlodinow
- Donald Prothero
- Nancy Segal
- Eugenie Scott
- Ambrose Swasey
- Julia Sweeney
- Frank Sulloway
- Carol Tavris
- Stuart Vyse

== See also ==
- The Skeptic (UK magazine)
- The Skeptic Encyclopedia of Pseudoscience, a collection of articles that discuss the Skeptics Society's scientific findings of investigations into popular pseudoscientific and supernatural claims.
