= Scientific skepticism =

Questioning of claims lacking empirical evidence

Scientific skepticism or rational skepticism (also spelled scepticism), sometimes referred to as skeptical inquiry, is a position in which one questions the veracity of claims lacking scientific evidence. In practice, the term most commonly refers to the examination of claims and theories that appear to be unscientific, rather than the routine discussions and challenges among scientists. Scientific skepticism differs from philosophical skepticism, which questions humans' ability to claim any knowledge about the nature of the world and how they perceive it, and the similar but distinct methodological skepticism, which is a systematic process of being skeptical about (or doubting) the truth of one's beliefs.

The skeptical movement (British spelling: sceptical movement) is a contemporary social movement based on the idea of scientific skepticism. The movement has the goal of investigating claims made on fringe topics and determining whether they are supported by empirical research and are reproducible, as part of a methodological norm pursuing "the extension of certified knowledge".

Roots of the movement date at least from the 19th century, when people started publicly raising questions regarding the unquestioned acceptance of claims about spiritism, of various widely held superstitions, and of pseudoscience. Publications such as those of the Dutch Vereniging tegen de Kwakzalverij (1881) also targeted medical quackery. Using as a template the Belgian organization founded in 1949, Comité Para, Americans Paul Kurtz and Marcello Truzzi founded the Committee for the Scientific Investigation of Claims of the Paranormal (CSICOP), in Amherst, New York, in 1976. Now known as the Committee for Skeptical Inquiry (CSI), this organization has inspired others to form similar groups worldwide.

== Overview ==
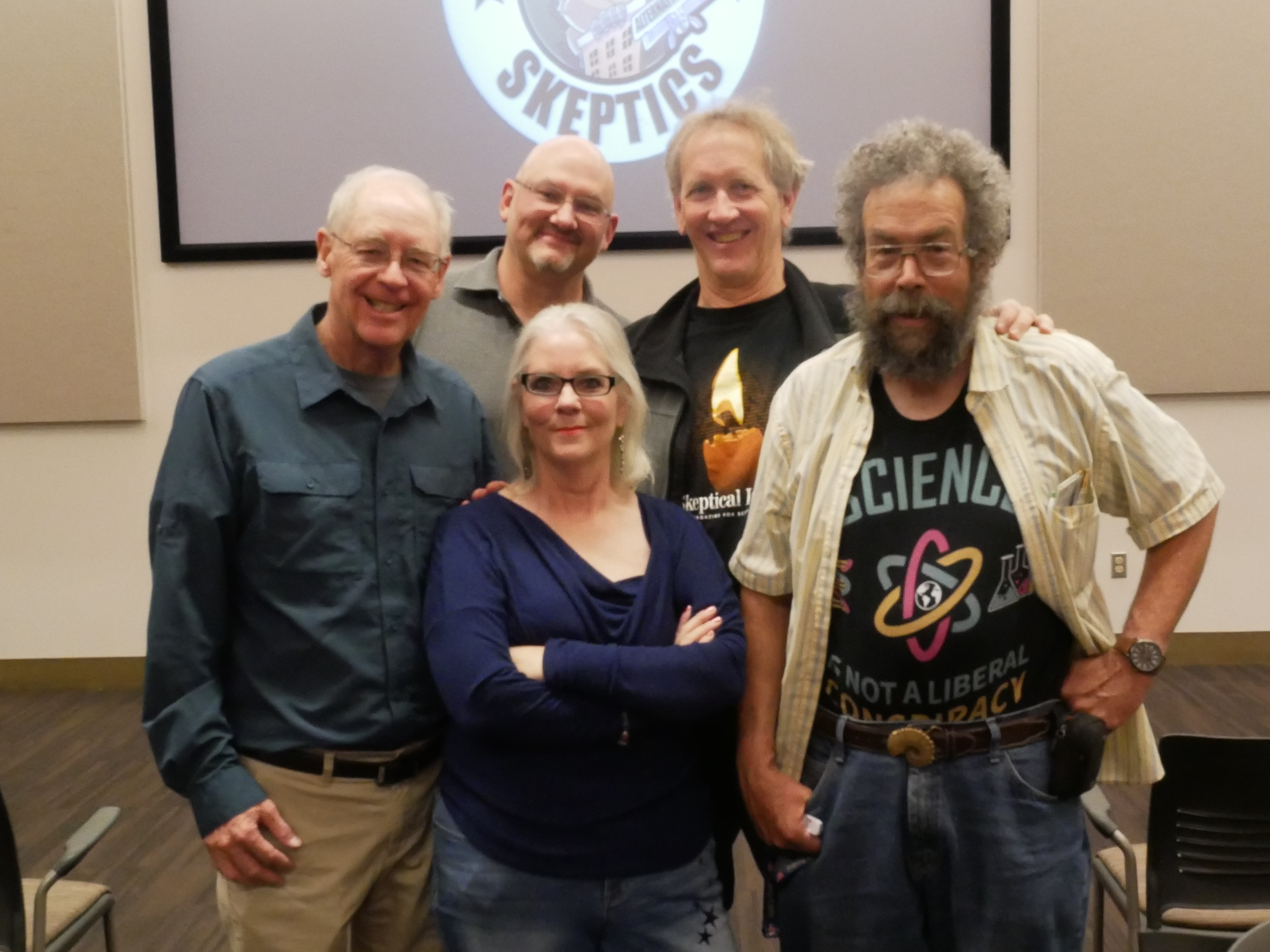
Five Fellows of Committee for Skeptical Inquiry in 2018

Scientific skeptics maintain that empirical investigation of reality leads to the most reliable empirical knowledge, and suggest that the scientific method is best suited to verifying results. Scientific skeptics attempt to evaluate claims based on verifiability and falsifiability; they discourage accepting claims which rely on faith or anecdotal evidence.

Paul Kurtz described scientific skepticism in his 1992 book The New Skepticism, calling it an essential part of scientific inquiry. The Skeptics Society describes it as "the application of reason to any and all ideas—no sacred cows allowed." Robert K. Merton introduced Mertonian norms, which assert that all ideas must be tested and are subject to rigorous, structured community scrutiny. Kendrick Frazier said that scientific skeptics have a commitment to science, reason, evidence, and the quest for truth. Carl Sagan emphasized the importance of being able to ask skeptical questions, recognizing fallacious or fraudulent arguments, and considering the validity of an argument rather than simply whether we like the conclusion. Similarly, Steven Novella described skepticism as selecting "beliefs and conclusions that are reliable and valid to ones that are comforting or convenient" and as the study of "pitfalls of human reason and the mechanisms of deception so as to avoid being deceived by others or themselves". Brian Dunning called skepticism "the process of finding a supported conclusion, not the justification of a preconceived conclusion.''

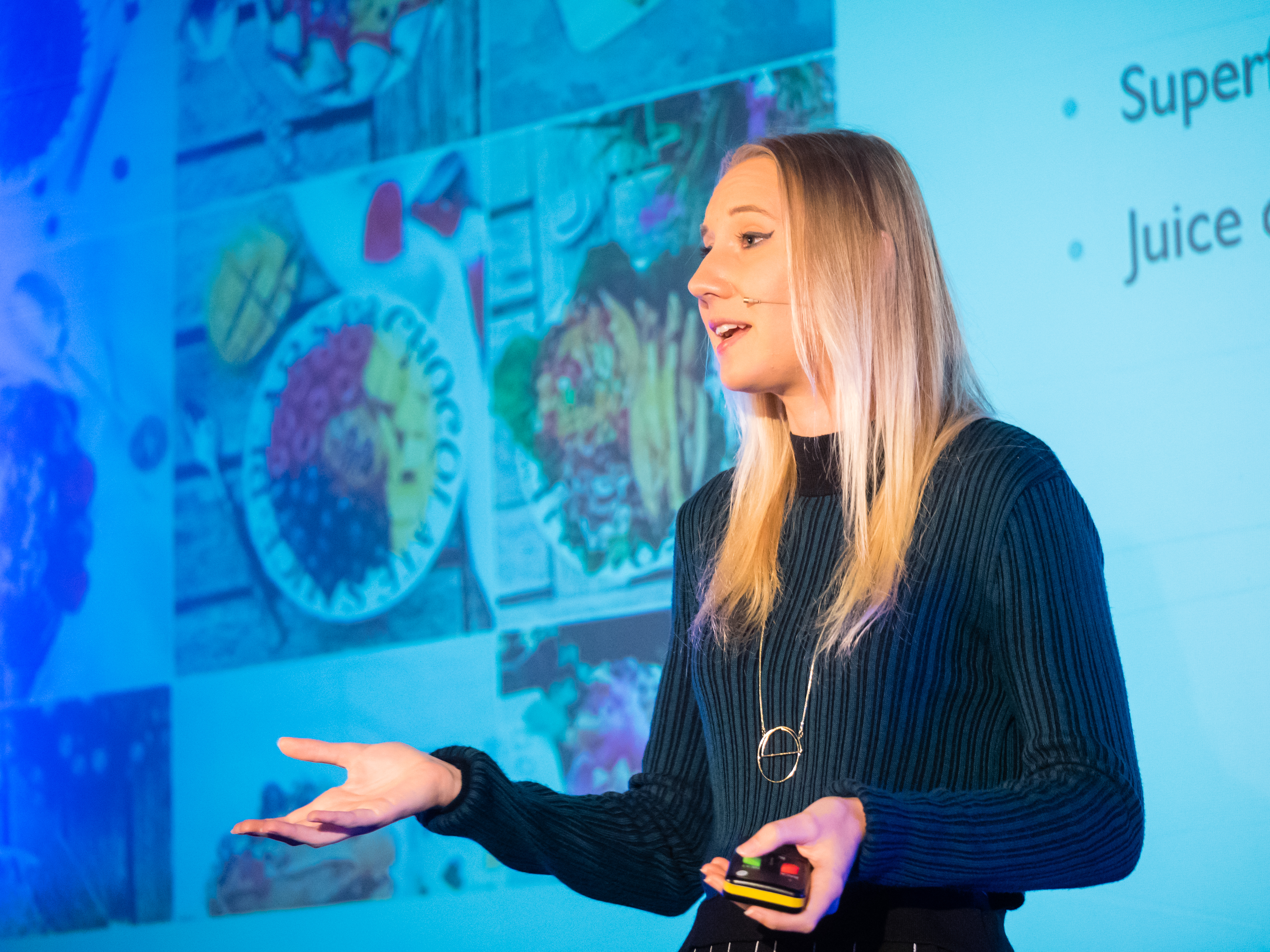
Nutritionist Pixie Turner talking about nutrition-related pseudoscience in 2019

Skeptics often focus their criticism on claims they consider implausible, dubious or clearly contradictory to generally accepted science. Scientific skeptics do not assert that unusual claims should be automatically rejected out of hand on a priori grounds—rather they argue that one should critically examine claims of paranormal or anomalous phenomena and that extraordinary claims would require extraordinary evidence in their favor before they could be accepted as having validity. From a scientific point of view, skeptics judge ideas on many criteria, including falsifiability, Occam's Razor, Morgan's Canon and explanatory power, as well as the degree to which their predictions match experimental results.

Skepticism in general may be deemed part of the scientific method; for instance an experimental result is not regarded as established until it can be shown to be repeatable independently.

The Sci.Skeptic FAQ characterizes the skeptic spectrum as divided into "wet" and "dry" skeptics, (Note: Direct URL has been blacklisted as a source: faqs.org/faqs/skeptic-faq/) primarily based on the level of engagement with those promoting claims that appear to be pseudoscience; the dry skeptics preferring to debunk and ridicule, in order to avoid giving attention and thus credence to the promoters, and the "wet" skeptics, preferring slower and more considered engagement, in order to avoid appearing sloppy and ill-considered and thus similar to the groups all skeptics opposed.

Ron Lindsay has argued that while some non-scientific claims appear to be harmless or "soft targets", it is important to continue to address them and the underlying habits of thought that lead to them so that we do not "have a lot more people believing that 9/11 was an inside job, that climate change is a hoax, that our government is controlled by aliens, and so forth—and those beliefs are far from harmless".

=== Skeptical movement ===
With regard to the skeptical social movement, Daniel Loxton refers to other movements already promoting "humanism, atheism, rationalism, science education and even critical thinking" beforehand. He saw the demand for the new movement—a movement of people called "skeptics"—as based on a lack of interest by the scientific community to address paranormal and fringe-science claims. In line with Kendrick Frazier, he describes the movement as a surrogate in that area for institutional science. The movement set up a distinct field of study, and provided an organizational structure, while "the long-standing genre of individual skeptical writing" lacked such a community and background. Skeptical organizations typically tend to have science education and promotion among their goals.

The skeptical movement has had issues with allegations of sexism. Mary Coulman identified a disparity between women and men in the movement in a 1985 skeptic newsletter. The skeptic movement has generally been made up of men; at a 1987 conference the members there discussed the fact that the attendees were predominantly older white men and a 1991 listing of 50 CSICOP fellows included four women. Following a 2011 conference, Rebecca Watson, a prominent skeptic, raised issues of the way female skeptics are targeted with online harassment including threats of sexual violence by opponents of the movement, and also raised issues of sexism within the movement itself. While she received some support in response to her discussion of sexism within the movement, she later became a target of virulent online harassment, even from fellow skeptics, after posting an online video that discussed her discomfort with being propositioned in a confined space. This became known as "Elevatorgate", based on Watson's discussion about being propositioned in a hotel elevator in the early morning after a skeptic event.

== Debunking and rational inquiry ==
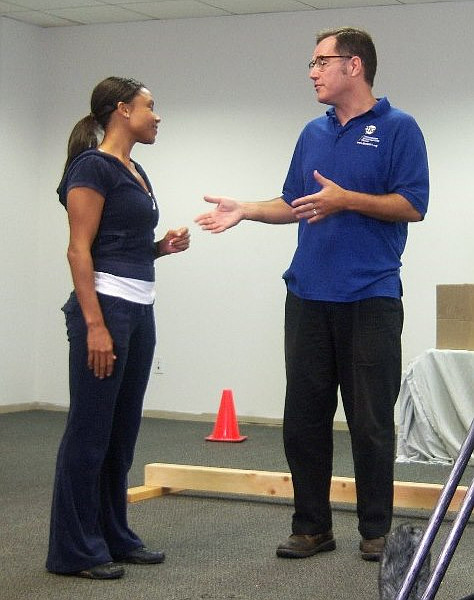
Independent Investigations Group testing Power Balance bracelet in 2010

The verb "to debunk" is used to describe efforts by skeptics to expose or discredit claims believed to be false, exaggerated, or pretentious. It is closely associated with skeptical investigation or rational inquiry of controversial topics (compare list of topics characterized as pseudoscience) such as U.F.O.s, claimed paranormal phenomena, cryptids, conspiracy theories, alternative medicine, religion, or exploratory or fringe areas of scientific or pseudoscientific research.

Further topics that scientifically skeptical literature questions include health claims surrounding certain foods, procedures, and alternative medicines; the plausibility and existence of supernatural abilities (e.g. tarot reading) or entities (e.g. poltergeists, angels, gods—including Zeus); the monsters of cryptozoology (e.g. the Loch Ness monster); as well as creationism/intelligent design, dowsing, conspiracy theories, and other claims the skeptic sees as unlikely to be true on scientific grounds.

Skeptics such as James Randi have become famous for debunking claims related to some of these. Paranormal investigator Joe Nickell cautions, however, that "debunkers" must be careful to engage paranormal claims seriously and without bias. He explains that open minded investigation is more likely to teach and change minds than debunking.

A striking characteristic of the skeptical movement is the fact that while most of the phenomena covered, such as astrology and homeopathy, have been debunked again and again, they stay popular. Frazier reemphasized in 2018 that "[w]e need independent, evidence-based, science-based critical investigation and inquiry now more than perhaps at any other time in our history."

The scientific skepticism community has traditionally been focused on what people believe rather than why they believe—there might be psychological, cognitive or instinctive reasons for belief when there is little evidence for such beliefs. According to Hammer, the bulk of the skeptical movement's literature works on an implicit model, that belief in the irrational is being based on scientific illiteracy or cognitive illusions. He points to the skeptical discussion about astrology: The skeptical notion of astrology as a "failed hypothesis" fails to address basic anthropological assumptions about astrology as a form of ritualized divination. While the anthropological approach attempts to explain the activities of astrologers and their clients, the skeptical movement's interest in the cultural aspects of such beliefs is muted.

According to sociologist David J. Hess, the skeptical discourse tends to set science and the skeptical project apart from the social and the economic. From this perspective, he argues that skepticism takes on some aspects of a sacred discourse, as in Emile Durkheim's Elementary Forms of the Religious Life—Science, seen as pure and sacred (motivated by values of the mind and reason), is set apart from popular dealings with the paranormal, seen as profane (permeated by the economic and the social); obscuring the confrontation between science and religion. Hess states as well a strong tendency in othering: both skeptics and their opponents see the other as being driven by materialistic philosophy and material gain and assume themselves to have purer motives.

=== Perceived dangers of pseudoscience ===
While not all pseudoscientific beliefs are necessarily dangerous, some can potentially be harmful. Plato believed that to release others from ignorance despite their initial resistance is a great and noble thing. Modern skeptical writers address this question in a variety of ways. Bertrand Russell argued that some individual actions based on beliefs for which there is no evidence of efficacy can result in destructive actions. James Randi often wrote on the issue of fraud by psychics and faith healers. Unqualified medical practice and alternative medicine can result in serious injury and death. Skeptical activist Tim Farley, who aims to create a catalogue of harmful pseudoscientific practices and cases of damage caused by them, estimates the documented number of killed or injured to be more than 600,000. Richard Dawkins points to religion as a source of violence (notably in The God Delusion), and considers creationism a threat to biology. Some skeptics, such as the members of The Skeptics' Guide to the Universe podcast, oppose certain new religious movements because of their cult-like behaviors.

Leo Igwe, Junior Fellow at the Bayreuth International Graduate School of African Studies and past Research Fellow of the James Randi Educational Foundation (JREF), wrote A Manifesto for a Skeptical Africa, which received endorsements from multiple public activists in Africa, as well as skeptical endorsers around the world. He is a Nigerian human rights advocate and campaigner against the impacts of child witchcraft accusations. Igwe came into conflict with high-profile witchcraft believers, leading to attacks on himself and his family.

In 2018, Amardeo Sarma provided some perspective on the state of the skeptical movement by addressing "the essence of contemporary skepticism and [highlighting] the vital nonpartisan and science-based role of skeptics in preventing deception and harm." He emphasized the dangers of pseudoscience as a reason for prioritizing skeptical work.

=== Pseudoskepticism ===
Richard Cameron Wilson, in an article in New Statesman, wrote that "the bogus skeptic is, in reality, a disguised dogmatist, made all the more dangerous for his success in appropriating the mantle of the unbiased and open-minded inquirer". Some advocates of discredited intellectual positions (such as AIDS denial, Holocaust denial and climate change denial) engage in pseudoskeptical behavior when they characterize themselves as "skeptics". This is despite their cherry picking of evidence that conforms to a pre-existing belief. According to Wilson, who highlights the phenomenon in his 2008 book Don't Get Fooled Again, the characteristic feature of false skepticism is that it "centres not on an impartial search for the truth, but on the defence of a preconceived ideological position".

Scientific skepticism is itself sometimes criticized on this ground. The term pseudoskepticism has found occasional use in controversial fields where opposition from scientific skeptics is strong. For example, in 1994, Susan Blackmore, a parapsychologist who became more skeptical and eventually became a Committee for the Scientific Investigation of Claims of the Paranormal (CSICOP) fellow in 1991, described what she termed the "worst kind of pseudoskepticism":

There are some members of the skeptics' groups who clearly believe they know the right answer prior to inquiry. They appear not to be interested in weighing alternatives, investigating strange claims, or trying out psychic experiences or altered states for themselves (heaven forbid!), but only in promoting their own particular belief structure and cohesion ...

Commenting on the labels "dogmatic" and "pathological" that the "Association for Skeptical Investigation" puts on critics of paranormal investigations, Bob Carroll of the Skeptic's Dictionary argues that that association "is a group of pseudo-skeptical paranormal investigators and supporters who do not appreciate criticism of paranormal studies by truly genuine skeptics and critical thinkers. The only skepticism this group promotes is skepticism of critics and [their] criticisms of paranormal studies."

== History ==
=== Historical roots ===
According to skeptic author Daniel Loxton, "skepticism is a story without a beginning or an end." His 2013 article in Skeptic magazine "Why Is There a Skeptical Movement" claims a history of two millennia of paranormal skepticism. He is of the opinion that the practice, problems, and central concepts extend all the way to antiquity and refers to a debunking tale as told in some versions of the Old Testament, where the Prophet Daniel exposes a tale of a "living" statue as a scam. According to Loxton, throughout history, there are further examples of individuals practicing critical inquiry and writing books or performing publicly against particular frauds and popular superstitions, including people like Lucian of Samosata (2nd century), Michel de Montaigne (16th century), Thomas Ady and Thomas Browne (17th century), Antoine Lavoisier and Benjamin Franklin (18th century), many different philosophers, scientists and magicians throughout the 19th and early 20th century up until and after Harry Houdini. However, skeptics banding together in societies that research the paranormal and fringe science is a modern phenomenon.

Two early important works influential to the skeptical movement were Daniel Webster Hering's Foibles and Fallacies of Science (1924) and D. H. Rawcliffe's The Psychology of the Occult.

Loxton mentions the Belgian Comité Para (1949) as the oldest "broad mandate" skeptical organization. Although it was preceded by the Dutch Vereniging tegen de Kwakzalverij (VtdK) (1881), which is therefore considered the oldest skeptical organization by others, the VtdK only focuses on fighting quackery, and thus has a 'narrow mandate'. The Comité Para was partly formed as a response to a predatory industry of bogus psychics who were exploiting the grieving relatives of people who had gone missing during the Second World War. In contrast, Michael Shermer traces the origins of the modern scientific skeptical movement to Martin Gardner's 1952 book Fads and Fallacies in the Name of Science.

In 1968, the French Association for Scientific Information (AFIS) was founded. AFIS strives to promote science against those who deny its cultural value, abuse it for criminal purposes or as a cover for quackery. According to AFIS, science itself cannot solve humanity's problems, nor can one solve them without using the scientific method. It maintains that people should be informed about scientific and technical advancements and the problems it helps to solve. Its magazine, Science et pseudo-sciences, attempts to distribute scientific information in a language that everyone can understand.

=== CSICOP and contemporary skepticism ===
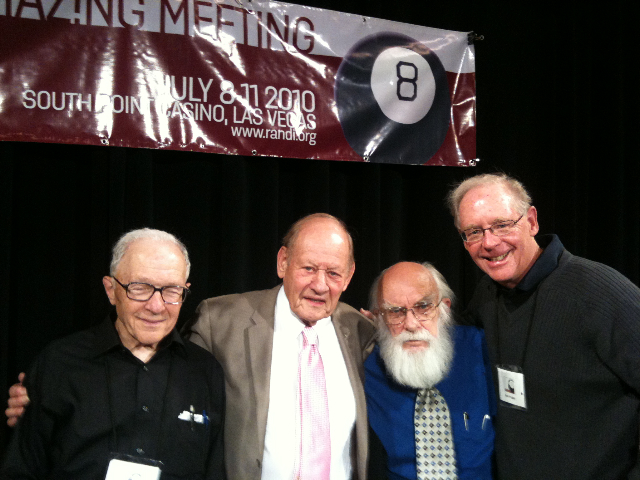
Influential North American skeptics: Ray Hyman, Paul Kurtz, James Randi and Kendrick Frazier

In 1976, the Committee for the Scientific Investigation of Claims of the Paranormal (CSICOP), known as the Committee for Skeptical Inquiry (CSI) since November 2006, was founded in the United States. Some see this as the "birth of modern skepticism", however, founder Paul Kurtz actually modeled it after the Comité Para, including its name. Kurtz' motive was being "dismayed ... by the rising tide of belief in the paranormal and the lack of adequate scientific examinations of these claims."

Kurtz was an atheist and had also founded the Committee for the Scientific Examination of Religion. While he saw both aspects as being covered in the skeptical movement, he had recommended CSICOP to focus on paranormal and pseudoscientific claims and to leave religious aspects to others. Despite not being the oldest, CSICOP was "the first successful, broad-mandate North American skeptical organization of the contemporary period", popularized the usage of the terms "skeptic", "skeptical" and "skepticism" by its magazine, Skeptical Inquirer, and directly inspired the foundation of many other skeptical organizations throughout the world, especially in Europe.

These included Australian Skeptics (1980), Vetenskap och Folkbildning (Sweden, 1982), New Zealand Skeptics (1986), GWUP (Austria, Germany and Switzerland, 1987), Skepsis r.y. (Finland, 1987), Stichting Skepsis (Netherlands, 1987), CICAP (Italy, 1989) and SKEPP (Dutch-speaking Belgium, 1990).

Besides scientists such as astronomers, stage magicians like James Randi were important in investigating charlatans and exposing their trickery. In 1996 Randi formed the James Randi Educational Foundation (JREF) and created the One Million Dollar Paranormal Challenge, where anyone who could demonstrate paranormal abilities, under mutually agreed-upon controlled circumstances, could claim the prize. After Randi's retirement in 2015, the Paranormal Challenge was officially terminated by the JREF with the prize unclaimed:

Effective 9/1/2015 the JREF has made major changes including converting to a grant making foundation and no longer accepting applications for the Million Dollar Prize from the general public.

Other influential second-generation American organizations were The Skeptics Society (founded in 1992 by Michael Shermer), the New England Skeptical Society (originating in 1996) and the Independent Investigations Group (formed in 2000 by James Underdown).

=== After 1989 ===
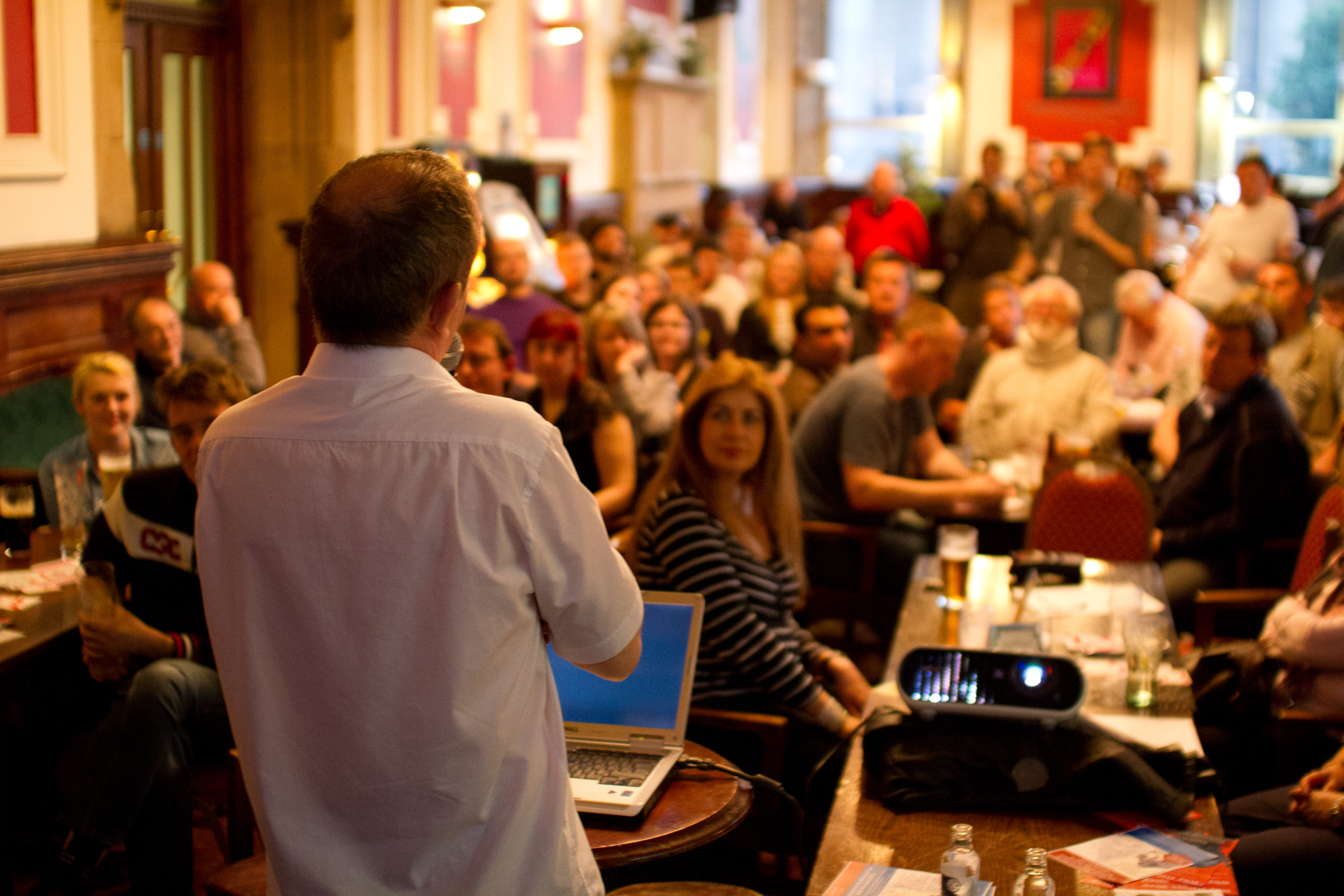
Brian Deer talks to the Merseyside Skeptics Society at a Skeptics in the Pub meeting.

After the Revolutions of 1989, Eastern Europe saw a surge in quackery and paranormal beliefs that were no longer restrained by the generally secular Communist regimes or the Iron curtain and its information barriers. The foundation of many new skeptical organizations was as well intending to protect consumers. These included the Czech Skeptics' Club Sisyfos (1995), the Hungarian Skeptic Society (2006), the Polish Sceptics Club (2010) and the Russian-speaking Skeptic Society (2013). The Austrian Skeptical Society in Vienna (founded in 2002) deals with issues such as Johann Grander's "vitalized water" and the use of dowsing at the Austrian Parliament.

The European Skeptics Congress (ESC) has been held throughout Europe since 1989, from 1994 onwards co-ordinated by the European Council of Skeptical Organizations. In the United States, The Amaz!ng Meeting (TAM) hosted by the JREF in Las Vegas had been the most important skeptical conference since 2003, with two spin-off conferences in London, UK (2009 and 2010) and one in Sydney, Australia (2010). Since 2010, the Merseyside Skeptics Society and Greater Manchester Skeptics jointly organized Question, Explore, Discover (QED) in Manchester, UK. World Skeptics Congresses have been held so far, namely in Buffalo, New York (1996), Heidelberg, Germany (1998), Sydney, Australia (2000), Burbank, California (2002), Abano Terme, Italy (2004) and Berlin, Germany (2012).

In 1991, the Center for Inquiry, a US think-tank, brought the CSICOP and the Council for Secular Humanism (CSH) under one umbrella. In January 2016, the Richard Dawkins Foundation for Reason and Science announced its merger with the Center for Inquiry.

In 2010, as a form of skeptical outreach to the general population, Susan Gerbic launched the Guerrilla Skepticism on Wikipedia (GSoW) project to improve skeptical content on Wikipedia.

== Notable skeptical media ==
Books

- The Demon-Haunted World
- Why People Believe Weird Things
- Fads and Fallacies in the Name of Science
- The Skeptics' Guide to the Universe

Magazines

- Skeptic (US)
- Skeptical Inquirer
- The Skeptic (UK)

Television programs

- Penn & Teller: Bullshit!
- MythBusters

Podcasts

- The Skeptics' Guide to the Universe
- Skepticality
- The Skeptic Zone
- Skeptoid
- Point of Inquiry
- For Good Reason

== See also ==
- Academic skepticism
- Anti-cult movement
- Atheism
- Brights movement
- Criticism of science
- Denialism
- Empiricism
- Freethought
- Inductivism
- Lists about skepticism
- Logical positivism
- Naturalism (philosophy)
- Philosophic burden of proof
- Positivism
- Precautionary principle
- Religious skepticism
- Reproducibility
- Scientific reductionism
- Scientism
- Secular humanism
- Secular movement
- SkeptiCamp
- Skepticism
- The Skeptic's Dictionary
- Snopes.com
- Theory of justification
- Superstitions
- Superstitions in Muslim societies
