= Elizabeth A. Wood =

American crystallographer and geologist

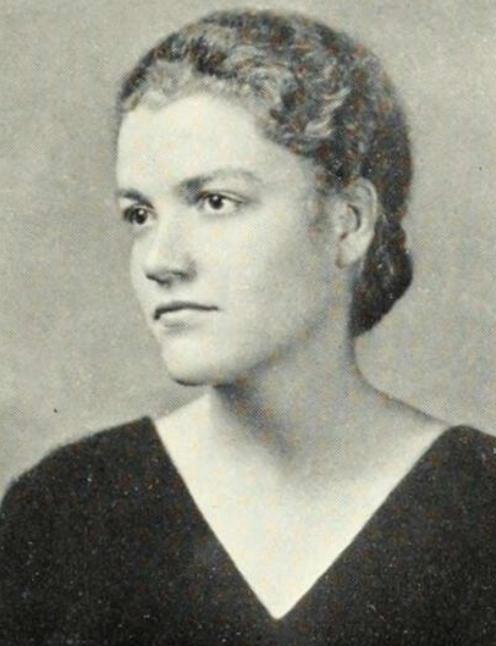
- Elizabeth "Betty" Armstrong Wood in 1933
- Born: October 19, 1912; New York City, US
- Died: March 23, 2006 (aged 93); Freehold, NJ
- Education: Barnard College, Bryn Mawr
- Known for: First woman hired as a Member of the Technical Staff at Bell Labs, research into electromagnetic properties of crystals
- Spouse: Ira Eaton "Sandy" Wood
- Scientific career
- Fields: Crystallography
- Workplaces: Bell Telephone Laboratories
- Thesis: Mylonization of Hybrid Rocks Near Philadelphia, Pennsylvania (1939)
- Doctoral advisor: Edward H. Watson
- Other academic advisors: Florence Bascom, Dorothy Wyckoff, Ida H. Ogilvie

Elizabeth Armstrong Wood (born Elizabeth J. Armstrong; 1912–2006) was an American crystallographer and geologist who ran a research program at Bell Telephone Laboratories that led to the development of new superconductors and lasers. She was known for the clarity of her writing and her efforts to educate the general public about scientific subjects.

== Education ==
Elizabeth Armstrong "Betty" Wood was born October 19, 1912, in New York, New York. Her parents were Herbert R. Armstrong and Winona M. Hull. She went to Barnard College for her B.A. and Bryn Mawr College for her master's degree and doctorate in geology. She went on to become an instructor in geology at Bryn Mawr for the 1934–35 and 1937–38 academic years. In the same period, she was an instructor in geology and mineralogy at Barnard (1935–37, 1938–41). She eventually became a research assistant at Columbia University.

== Career ==
In 1942, Wood—whose interest in crystallography had developed at Bryn Mawr—took a job in the Physical Research Department of Bell Telephone Laboratories, where she was the first woman scientist hired as a Member of the Technical Staff (MTS). During WWII she worked on quartz crystals, which were key components in radio communications. For over two decades, she ran a crystallographic research program at Bell Labs (Murray Hill, NJ), focusing primarily on the electromagnetic properties of crystals. She addressed such problems as growing single crystals that would have useful conductive, magnetic, or other properties; as well as investigating new crystalline materials with ferromagnetic or piezoelectric properties. She looked at phase transitions in silicon, irradiation coloring in quartz, and ways to change the state of certain materials through the application of electric fields. In the course of her research, she developed "the first systematic notation for surface crystallography", or Wood notation. Her work fed into the development of new superconductors and lasers at Bell Labs.

Wood became known for the clarity of her writing, particularly in books intended for nonscientists such as Science for the Airplane Passenger (1969). Her Crystals and Light (1964), written for people with no prior background in optics, was long considered the standard beginner's textbook in the field. A version of this book, Experiments with Crystals and Light (1964), was put out by Bell Labs for high school students as part of an experiment kit. Her Crystal Orientation Manual (1963) was a widely used handbook for technicians on the proper preparation of crystals for research. As the title of her 1962 booklet Rewarding Careers for Women in Physics (1962) suggests, she championed efforts to bring more women into the sciences, speaking out on the issues involved—such as cultural disapproval of professional women—at meetings and conferences.

From the 1950s to the 1970s, Bell Labs spent some $500 million on technologies to create a videophone. In 1964, Bell Labs debuted its "Picturephone" system, with limited commercial service in a few cities. The service was inaugurated with a ceremonial call from First Lady Bird Johnson to Wood in Bell Labs' videophone center in New York City.

Wood was a fellow of the American Physical Society. She was awarded honorary doctorates by Wheaton College (1963), Western College, Ohio (1965), and Worcester Polytechnic Institute (1970).

Throughout her career, Wood undertook leadership roles in a number of professional organizations. One of her more prominent efforts was to participate in the founding of the American Crystallographic Association (ACA) out of a merger between the American Society for X-Ray and Electron Diffraction (ASXRED) and the Crystallographic Society of America (CSA). In 1957, she became the ACA's second president and the first woman to hold that position.

Other leadership activities included the following:

- Chair, U.S. delegation to International Union of Crystallography (IUCr) General Assembly (1957)
- Board Member, American Institute of Physics (AIP, 1963–69)
- Associate Director, National Science Foundation's Physical Science for Nonscience Students Project (1965–1971)
- AIP Commission on College Physics (1967–1971)
- Member, IUCr Commission on Crystallographic Teaching (1969–1972)

== Personal life ==
Wood and her husband hybridized irises as a hobby and gained recognition in the field.

== Death and legacy ==
Wood died March 23, 2006, of a stroke. In 1997, the ACA established the Elizabeth A. Wood Science Writing Award to honor the authors of publications that do an exceptional job in writing about science for the public. The award is presented every three years, and the first honoree was Nobel laureate Roald Hoffmann. Other winners have included K.C. Cole, Ira Flatow and Oliver Sacks.

== Books ==
- Science for the Airplane Passenger (1969); Wood, Elizabeth A. (1975). Science from Your Airplane Window (2nd revised ed.). Dover Publications. ISBN 9780486232058.
- Crystals and Light: An Introduction to Optical Crystallography; Wood, Elizabeth A. (1977). Crystals and Light: An Introduction to Optical Crystallography (2nd revised ed.). New York: Dover Publications. ISBN 9780486234311.
- Experiments with Crystals and Light (1964)
- The 88 Diperiodic Groups in Three Dimensions (1964)
- Crystal Orientation Manual (1963)
- Rewarding Careers for Women in Physics (1962)
- Pressing Needs in School Science (1969)
- Crystals - A Handbook for School Teachers (1972)
