= Robert Todd Carroll =

American philosopher, writer and academic (1945–2016)

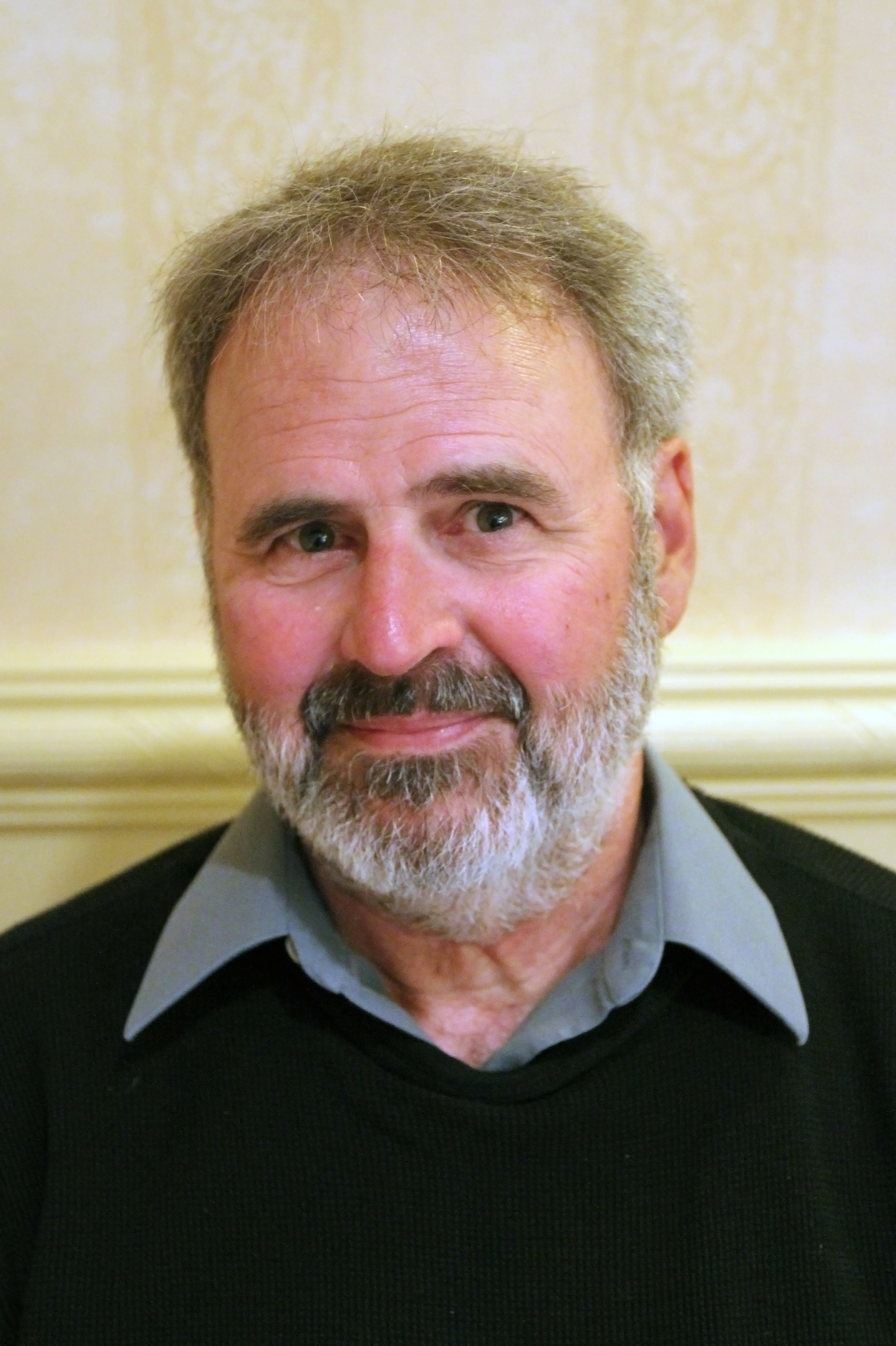
- Carroll in 2011
- Born: Robert Todd Carroll; May 18, 1945; Joliet, Illinois, U.S.
- Died: August 25, 2016 (aged 71); Davis, California, U.S.
- Education: University of California, San Diego
- Occupations: Author, professor
- Website: www.skepdic.com

Robert Todd Carroll (May 18, 1945 – August 25, 2016) was an American author, philosopher and academic, best known for The Skeptic's Dictionary. He described himself as a naturalist, an atheist, a materialist, a metaphysical libertarian, and a positivist. In 2010 he was elected a fellow of the Committee for Skeptical Inquiry. He was a professor of philosophy at Sacramento City College from 1977 until his retirement in 2007.

== Life ==
Carroll was born in Joliet, Illinois, on May 18, 1945. His father worked in a coal processing plant. In 1954 the family moved to San Diego, where Carroll grew up. He described his early years in Ocean Beach as an ideal childhood. He was raised Catholic.

Carroll went to the University of San Diego High School and then received a Catholic education from the University of Notre Dame. He went into seminary in Notre Dame, but after a short time he left in 1965 and went back to San Diego. Carroll earned his PhD in philosophy in 1974 at the University of California, San Diego, writing his doctoral thesis under the direction of Richard H. Popkin on the religious philosophy of Edward Stillingfleet, who had defended the Anglican church passionately against Catholics, deists and atheists before becoming Bishop of Worcester. Carroll's thesis was published in 1975. By then Carroll was married, with two daughters. The new family moved to Susanville, California, where he started teaching philosophy at Lassen Community College. He later moved to the Sacramento area and from 1977 lived in Davis.

Carroll said he never went through a religious deconversion moment but instead had a long journey to disbelief. He first started doubting Catholicism, he said, when he went into seminary in Notre Dame. After leaving the seminary he became intrigued by eastern religions and, inspired by Alan Watts, started looking at their holy books. Carroll became interested in Paramahansa Yogananda and attended meetings of his Self-Realization Fellowship to do yoga and chanting. At the time, he identified as agnostic. After leaving the Fellowship, he said, he spent years thinking about his religion. He later said, "The more I thought about religious ideas, the more false and absurd they seem to me." Carroll took up Kierkegaard's idea that religious beliefs require a leap of faith because they cannot be rationally proven. But Carroll decided to leap in the other direction. He said he "found many reasons for disbelief and absolutely no reasons for belief."

In May 2014, Carroll was diagnosed with stage IV pancreatic neuroendocrine cancer and liver metastasis. In May 2016 he announced he would no longer be able to write the Skeptic's Dictionary monthly newsletter on account of his illness. On August 25, 2016, Carroll died in a local hospital in Davis, California. He was survived by his wife and his two daughters and two grandchildren.

== Career ==
=== Professor ===
Carroll started teaching philosophy part time at Lassen Community College. Then he taught philosophy of religion at American River College for two years. Thereafter he taught full time at Sacramento City College, where from 1977 through 2007 he taught introductory philosophy; logic and critical reasoning; law, justice, and punishment; and critical thinking about the paranormal. For several years he served as chairman of the philosophy department.

=== Writer ===
Drawing on his classwork, Carroll wrote Becoming a Critical Thinker: A Guide for a New Millennium, an introductory textbook for logic and critical thinking. Pearson Educational published the first edition in 2000. A second edition was published in 2005.

In 2003 John Wiley & Son published a paperback edition of The Skeptic's Dictionary, derived from Carroll's website of the same name. The book provides essays on subjects Carroll considered supernatural, occult, paranormal, or pseudoscientific. It generally assumed that something is false until proven true. In the last chapter, Carroll offered ways to improve critical thinking and skepticism. The book is also available in Dutch, English, Japanese, Korean, and Russian.

In 2011 Carroll published online a children's version of The Skeptic's Dictionary. In 2013, it came out as a book under the title Mysteries and Science: Exploring Aliens, Ghosts, Monsters, the End of the World and Other Weird Things. Carroll also wrote Unnatural Acts: Critical Thinking, Skepticism, and Science Exposed!, which was published as an e-book in 2011 by the James Randi Educational Foundation. A paperback version is available from Lulu. In 2013 Carroll also self-published The Critical Thinker's Dictionary, which features short articles about cognitive biases and logical fallacies.

=== Skeptic ===
Carroll said he had been investigating controversial beliefs since he was seven years old when he had doubts about Santa Claus. Carroll started writing skeptical content in 1992, when both his best friend and his father-in-law died within the same week. He later said, "It was like the deaths of these two people had forced me to start looking at everything and not take anything for granted."

After Carroll and his wife attended free training in 1994 in which they learned about the Internet and HTML code, Carroll started the Skeptic's Dictionary website (skepdic.com) with ten articles written for his students and expanded it from there. Although the website was a one-man project, volunteers later assisted in editing it and translated it into more than a dozen languages. The Skeptic's Dictionary, Carroll said, was inspired by Pierre Bayle's Historical and Critical Dictionary in both its name and its biased stance.

On March 27, 2012, Carroll began a regular segment on the podcast Skepticality entitled "Unnatural Virtue" in which he commented on topics in critical thinking and skepticism. The segment ran for thirty-one episodes, until April 29, 2014.

Carroll spoke at several skeptic conferences. In 2003 he spoke at the first Amaz!ng Meeting and at a conference of the Committee for the Scientific Investigation of Claims of the Paranormal on frauds and hoaxes. In 2004 he spoke to the Irish Skeptics in Dublin. In 2007 he conducted a critical-thinking workshop at the 5th Amazing Meeting. In 2011 he led a discussion on "Five Myths About Skeptics" at the second annual SkeptiCalCon event, held in Berkeley, CA.

He was also interviewed by groups promoting scientific skepticism, such as the New England Skeptical Society and Media Man Australia. In January 2010 he was elected a Fellow of the Committee for Skeptical Inquiry.

In an interview with Point of Inquiry's Karen Stollznow, Carroll said he did not earn much money from his skeptical work: "If we talk about the money we make from skepticism we might set a record for the shortest interview ever." But everybody should be a skeptic, he said, because it is a healthy way of approaching life. He said that skeptics' meetups and conferences, as well as the positive feedback he received on his work, were his main motivations.

== Criticism ==
=== Richard Milton ===
After Carroll published a piece online labelling Richard Milton's writings on alternative science "Internet Bunk," Milton responded by accusing Carroll of being a "pseudo-skeptic" and said that Carroll had fabricated quotations and misrepresented his arguments. Carroll replied to these accusations in an addendum to his piece.

=== Rupert Sheldrake ===
Carroll wrote two Skeptic's Dictionary entries criticizing Rupert Sheldrake's ideas. The first criticized Sheldrake's N'kisi Project, a set of experiments meant to test the possibility of a telepathic link between N'kisi (a grey parrot) and its owner, Aimee Morgana. Carroll charged that when calculating the statistical significance of the parrot's responses, Sheldrake had omitted 60 percent of the data. Carroll further criticized Jane Goodall for her involvement in the Project. The second entry challenged Sheldrake's morphic resonance idea, in which Sheldrake proposed that, in addition to genetic influences, a "morphogenetic field" for each species evolves similarly to how the species' genes might evolve, that these fields organize the nervous system's activity and can act as a collective memory for the whole species, and that these fields get passed down into the species.

== Publications ==
- The Common-sense Philosophy of Religion of Bishop Edward Stillingfleet 1635–1699, ISBN 90-247-1647-0. (1974 doctoral dissertation, under the direction of Richard Popkin, University of California at San Diego).
- Becoming a Critical Thinker: A Guide for the New Millennium, Needham Heights, Massachusetts, Pearson Custom, 2001. ISBN 0-536-60060-0.
- The Skeptic's Dictionary: A Collection of Strange Beliefs, Amusing Deceptions, and Dangerous Delusions, New York: John Wiley & Sons, 2003, ISBN 0-471-27242-6.
- Unnatural Acts: Critical Thinking, Skepticism, and Science Exposed!, Los Angeles: James Randi Educational Foundation, 2011, ISBN 978-1-105-90219-2.
- The Critical Thinker's Dictionary: Biases, Fallacies, and Illusions and what you can do about them, lulu.com, November 2013, ISBN 978-1-304-62277-8.
- Mysteries and Science: Exploring Aliens, Ghosts, Monsters, the End of the World and Other Weird Things [A Skeptic's Dictionary for Kids], OCLC 973947502.
