= Karen Stollznow =

Australian-American skeptic

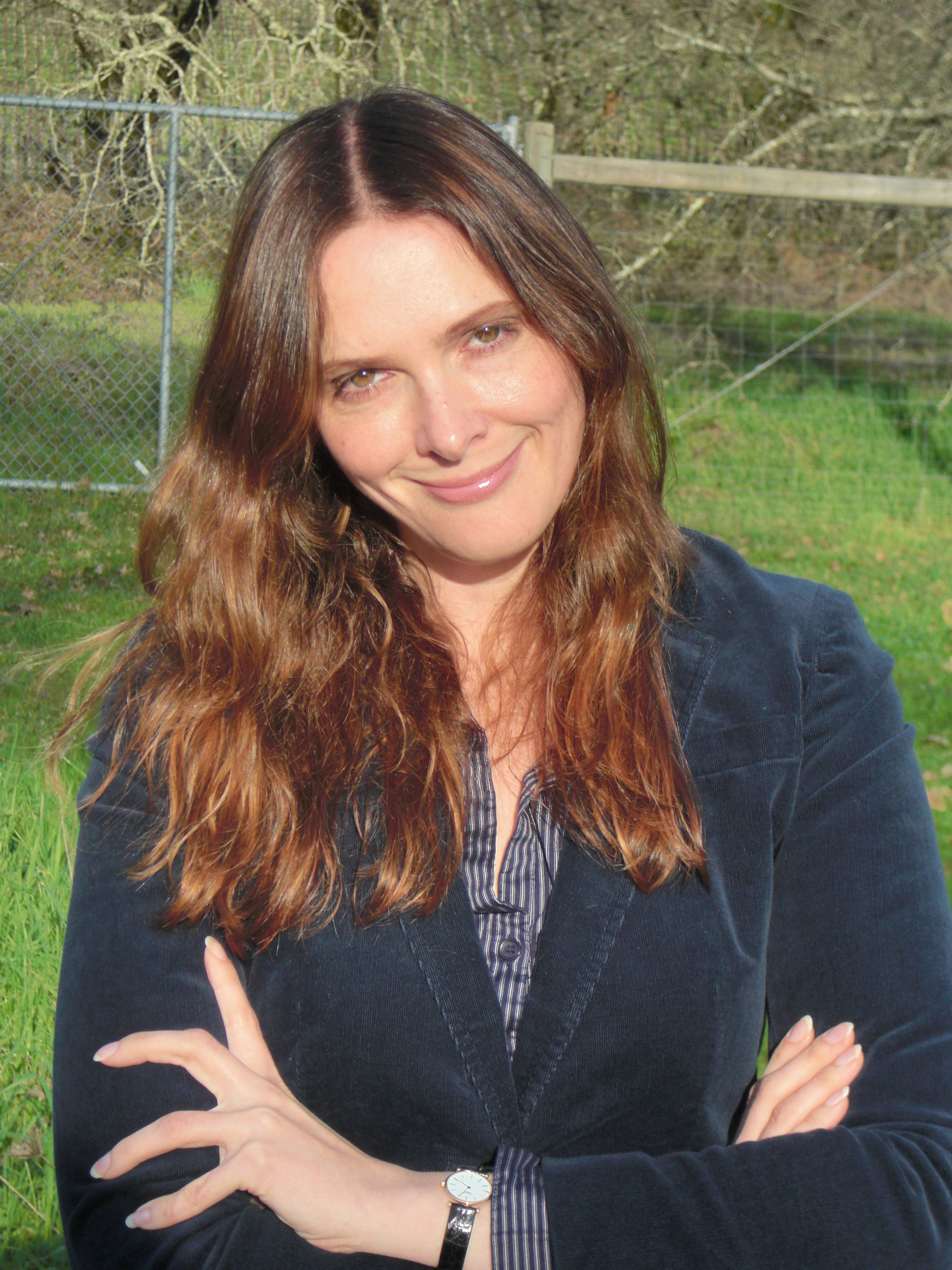
- February 2010
- Born: Australia
- Education: University of New England
- Known for: Writing, Linguistics, Podcasting, Skepticism of the paranormal, Research Fellow for JREF and CSI
- Scientific career
- Fields: Linguistics
- Workplaces: San Francisco State University; University of California, Berkeley; University of New England; Cal Poly; University of Colorado Boulder; Metropolitan State College of Denver; Griffith University
- Website: http://www.karenstollznow.com

Karen Stollznow is an Australian-American author, linguist, public speaker, and podcaster. Her books include the forthcoming Beyond Words: How we learn, use, and lose language , Bitch: The Journey of a Word, Missed Conceptions: How We Make Sense of Infertility, On the Offensive: Prejudice in Language Past and Present, The Language of Discrimination, God Bless America: Strange and Unusual Religious Beliefs and Practices in the United States, Haunting America, Language Myths, Mysteries and Magic, Hits and Mrs, and Would You Believe It?: Mysterious Tales From People You'd Least Expect. Stollznow also writes short fiction, including the title Fisher's Ghost and Other Stories, and she is a host on the podcast Monster Talk with Blake Smith. She has written for many popular publications, including The Conversation and Psychology Today. Stollznow has also appeared as an expert on many TV shows, including the History Channel's History's Greatest Mysteries and Netflix's Files of the Unexplained.

== Career ==
Stollznow’s work spans linguistics, authorship, and public scholarship, with a focus on language as it relates to culture, identity, and belief. A student of linguistics and history at the University of New England in Armidale, New South Wales, she received First Class Honors in Linguistics, and went on to a PhD in the area of Lexical Semantics. She graduated with her doctorate in 2007. In 2004, she relocated to California to become a Visiting Student Researcher with the Department of Linguistics at the University of California, Berkeley. In 2005, she became a Researcher for the Script Encoding Initiative, a project of the UC Berkeley Department of Linguistics, in cooperation with the Unicode Consortium. She is currently a researcher in the Department of Linguistics at Griffith University and also affiliated with the Griffith Centre for Social and Cultural Research.

From 1997 to 2009, Stollznow was a prominent investigator and writer for the Australian Skeptics and served as Editor of their magazine The Skeptic for which she also wrote many articles. She has also written for publications such as Australasian Science, Neucleus, Skeptical Inquirer, and others.

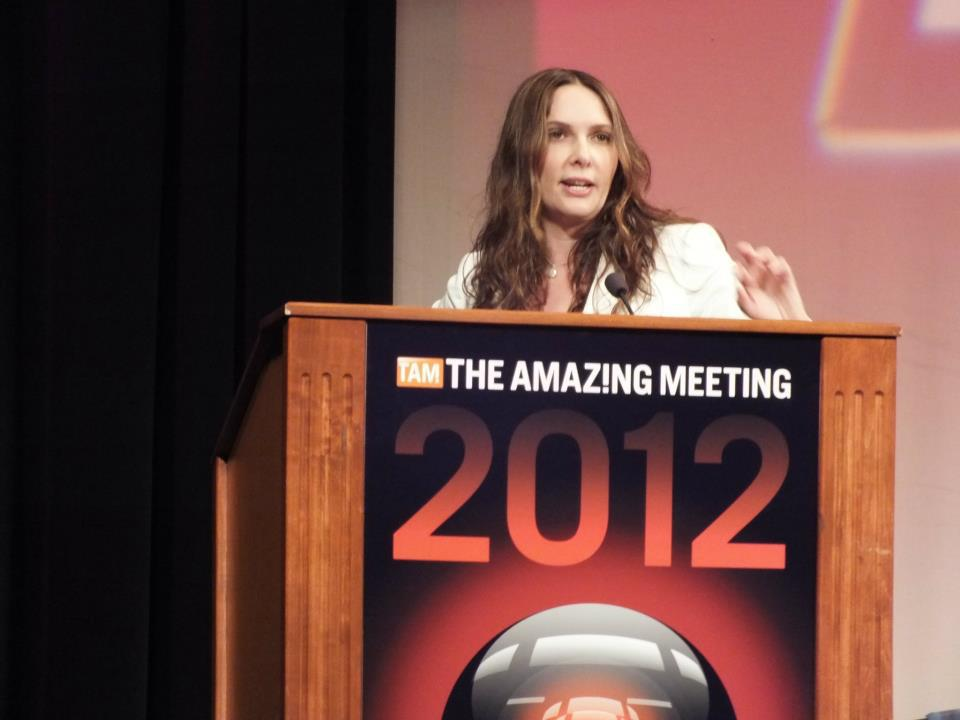
Karen Stollznow Presents at TAM 2012

Between 2009 and 2011 she wrote the Naked Skeptic column for the Committee for Skeptical Inquiry (CSI), now rebranded as The Good Word for Skeptical Inquirer. In 2010 she began as the Bad Language columnist for Skeptic. She has been a host of the Skeptics Society's MonsterTalk podcast since its beginning in 2009 and in 2010 she became a host of the Center for Inquiry's Point of Inquiry podcast as well. In 2011 she presented a talk at the Colorado Springs SkeptiCamp on Making (Up) History, and at the Denver/Boulder SkeptiCamp on Braco the Gazer. In 2012 she was a speaker at The Amazing Meeting in Las Vegas, giving a talk titled "Prediction and Language", and in 2013 giving a talk titled "What an Excellent Day for an Exorcism".

Stollznow was also a Research Fellow for the James Randi Educational Foundation, was a Contributing Editor for Skeptical Inquirer magazine, and was a Fellow of the Committee for Skeptical Inquiry.

Since the mid-2010s, Stollznow’s work has increasingly focused on linguistics, authorship, and the study of language in its cultural and social contexts. Her research and writing during this period have emphasized sociolinguistics, including the analysis of gendered language, slurs, and taboo expressions.

She is the author of several books examining language and identity, including Bitch: The Journey of a Word, published by Cambridge University Press, which traces the historical development and cultural impact of a gendered term, and On the Offensive: Prejudice in Language Past and Present, which explores discriminatory language across cultures and historical periods.

In addition to her academic and literary work, Stollznow has continued to engage in public scholarship through media and broadcasting. She has appeared in television and streaming productions addressing cultural beliefs and unexplained phenomena, including programs distributed by Netflix and the History Channel.

She has also remained active in podcasting and science communication, including her involvement with MonsterTalk, which examines folklore, paranormal claims, and belief systems from a scientific and cultural perspective.

== Selected publications ==
- Stollznow, Karen (2026). Beyond Words: How we learn, use, and lose language Cambridge University Press ISBN 9781009587389
- Stollznow, Karen (2024). bitch: The Journey of a Word. Cambridge University Press
- Stollznow, Karen (2020). On The Offensive: Prejudice in Language Past and Present Cambridge University Press ISBN 9781108791786
- Stollznow, Karen (2017). The Language of Discrimination. Lincom GmbH. ISBN 978-3862887903
- Stollznow, Karen (2017). Would You Believe It?: Mysterious Tales From People You'd Least Expect. Amazon Digital Services. ASIN B01MQVE2Z5
- Stollznow, Karen (2016). Hits and Mrs. Amazon Digital Services. ASIN B01BJGUCXI
- Stollznow, Karen (2014). Language Myths, Mysteries and Magic. ISBN 978-1137404855
- Stollznow, Karen (2013). God Bless America: Strange and Unusual Religious Beliefs and Practices in the United States. ISBN 978-1939578006
- Stollznow, Karen (2013). Haunting America. James Randi Educational Foundation. ASIN B00DSQVBAQ.
- Stollznow, Karen (2010). Skepticism and the Paranormal: A Rose By Any Other Name. In Bonett, W. (Ed.) The Australian Book of Atheism. Scribe Publications ISBN 1921640766 OCLC 653346301
- Stollznow, Karen (June 2009), "The Writing's on the Wall for the World's Endangered Writing Systems", The Australian and New Zealand Journal of Technical Communication Southern Communicator (17): 12–13
- Stollznow, Karen (2009), "Keith Allan & Kate Burridge, Forbidden words: Taboo and the censoring of language. Cambridge: Cambridge University Press, 2006.", Language in Society, 38 (1): 135–136, doi:10.1017/s0047404508090234, OCLC 4668942846, S2CID 145114519
- Stollznow, Karen (2008), "Dehumanisation in language and thought", Journal of Language and Politics, 7 (2): 177–200, doi:10.1075/jlp.7.2.01sto, OCLC 535670348
- Stollznow, Karen (2007), "Key Words in the Discourse of Discrimination: A Semantic Analysis", PhD Dissertation University of New England, OCLC 277175055
- Stollznow, Karen (2005), "When Opposites Attract: The Re-appropriation and Amelioration of Words in Australian English", Society of North America, Boston
- Stollznow, Karen (2004), "Whinger! Wanker! Wowser! 'Aussie English insults: deprecatory language and the Australian Ethos'" (PDF), Proceedings of the 2003 Australian Linguistic Society, Australian Journal of Linguistics: 11
- Collins, Anne ed. Stollznow, Karen (2004), "Who You Gonna Call?", English Express 2, pp. 33–38, ISBN 0123602432
- Stollznow, Karen (2003), "The semantics and usage of abusive epithets in Australian English. Conference paper proceedings", New Zealand Linguist Society Wellington
- Stollznow, Karen (2002), "Terms of Abuse in Australian English: An analysis of abusive and insulting epithets in Australian English", University of New England BA Honors Thesis

== Personal life ==
Stollznow is an expatriate Australian and formerly lived in the San Francisco Bay Area, California. Born in the Sydney suburb of Manly, she grew up in Collaroy, on the Northern Beaches of Sydney.

Stollznow lives with her husband Matthew Baxter and their son in Denver, Colorado.
