= The Skeptic's Dictionary =

2003 essay collection by Robert Todd Carroll

- Author: Robert Todd Carroll
- Language: English
- Subject: Scientific skepticism
- Genre: Non-fiction
- Publisher: John Wiley & Sons
- Publication date: August 15, 2003
- Publication place: United States
- Media type: Paperback
- Pages: 446
- ISBN: 978-0-471-27242-7
- OCLC: 52086432
- Dewey Decimal: 001.9 21
- LC Class: Q172.5.P77 C37 2003
- Followed by: Becoming a Critical Thinker: A Guide for the New Millennium

The Skeptic's Dictionary is a collection of cross-referenced skeptical essays by Robert Todd Carroll, published on his website skepdic.com and in a printed book. The skepdic.com site was launched in 1994 and the book was published in 2003 with nearly 400 entries. As of January 2011 the website has over 700 entries. A comprehensive single-volume guides to skeptical information on pseudoscientific, paranormal, and occult topics, the bibliography contains some seven hundred references for more detailed information. According to the back cover of the book, the on-line version receives approximately 500,000 hits per month.

The Skeptic's Dictionary is, according to its foreword, intended to be a small counterbalance to the voluminous occult and paranormal literature; not to present a balanced view of occult subjects.

== Contents ==
According to Carroll,

“The Skeptic’s Dictionary is aimed at four distinct audiences: the open-minded seeker, who makes no commitment to or disavowal of occult claims; the soft skeptic, who is more prone to doubt than to believe; the hardened skeptic, who has strong disbelief about all things occult; and the believing doubter, who is prone to believe but has some doubts. The one group this book is not aimed at is the 'true believer' in the occult. If you have no skepticism in you, this book is not for you.”

Carroll defines each of these categories, explaining how and why, in his opinion, his dictionary may be of interest, use, and benefit to each of them. He also defines the term “skepticism” as he uses it and identifies two types of skeptic, the Apollonian, who is “committed to clarity and rationality” and the Dionysian, who is “committed to passion and instinct.” William James, Bertrand Russell, and Friedrich Nietzsche exemplify the Apollonian skeptic, Carroll says, and Charles Sanders Peirce, Tertullian, Søren Kierkegaard, and Blaise Pascal are Dionysian skeptics.

The articles in the book are in several categories:

- Alternative medicine
- Cryptozoology
- Extraterrestrials and UFOs
- Frauds and hoaxes
- Junk science and pseudoscience
- Logic and perception
- New Age beliefs
- The paranormal and the occult
- Science and philosophy
- The supernatural and the metaphysical.

Print versions are available in Dutch, English, Japanese, Korean, and Russian. Numerous entries have been translated for the Internet in several other languages. A newsletter keeps interested parties up to date on new entries and an archived list of previous newsletters is available online. Norcross et al. state that Carroll has made considerable progress in exposing pseudoscience and quackery.

== Reception ==
Roy Herbert's review of the paperback version written for the New Scientist magazine commented that "it is an amazing assembly, elegantly written and level-headed, with a wry remark here and there", and that "this superb work is likely to be used so often that it is a pity it is a softback book.". Skeptical Inquirer stated that it was "a book that should be a staple of everyone’s diet-part of the package we are given at birth to help us avoid the dangers and pitfalls of living in a world riddled with bad ideas and empty promises...". It was also described by Gary Jason, a Philosophy professor at California State University as "... a good reference book for a critical thinking class."

== See also ==
- An Encyclopedia of Claims, Frauds, and Hoaxes of the Occult and Supernatural – 1995 book by James Randi
- Critical thinking – Analysis of facts to form a judgment
- The Skeptic Encyclopedia of Pseudoscience – 2002 book by Michael Shermer
- FactCheck.org – Fact-checking website
- Freethought – Position that beliefs should be formed only on the basis of logic, reason, and empiricism
- Pseudoscience – Unscientific claims presented as scientific
- Scientific skepticism – Questioning of claims lacking empirical evidence
- Skeptical Inquirer – Bimonthly magazine published by CSI
- Skepticism – Doubtful attitude toward knowledge claims
- Skeptic (US magazine) – Science education magazine
- List of books about skepticism
- Snopes.com – Fact-checking website
- The Freethinker journal – Skeptic journal
- The Skeptic (UK magazine) – British magazine
- The Straight Dope – Column published in the Chicago Reader
- List of common misconceptions
