= K. C. Cole =

American non-fiction writer (born 1946)

- Born: August 22, 1946 (age 80)
- Education: Barnard College
- Occupations: Writer, author, radio commentator, and professor
- Writing career
- Subject: Science
- Notable works: The Universe and the Teacup: The Mathematics of Truth and Beauty, Something Incredibly Wonderful Happens: Frank Oppenheimer and the World He Made Up
- Notable awards: American Institute of Physics Science Writing Award
- Website: kccole.com

K. C. Cole (born August 22, 1946) is an American science writer, author, radio commentator and professor emerita at the USC Annenberg School for Communication and Journalism. She has covered science for The Los Angeles Times since 1994, as well as writing for many other publications, and has been described as "the queen of the metaphor in science writing".

Of the ten books she has written, eight are nonfiction. These include the bestseller The Universe and the Teacup: The Mathematics of Truth and Beauty (1998), which has been translated into a dozen languages, and her memoir about her late mentor, Frank Oppenheimer, Something Incredibly Wonderful Happens: Frank Oppenheimer and the World He Made Up (2009).

Cole has received awards from the National Women's Political Caucus, the American Crystallographic Association, the American Institute of Physics and the Skeptics Society, among others. She is a Lifetime Honorary Member of Sigma Xi.

== Personal life ==
Cole grew up in multiple locations including Rio de Janeiro, Brazil and Port Washington, New York. She studied political science at Barnard College, where she received her B.A.

In 1968, she traveled to Eastern Europe, living in Czechoslovakia just one year after the Warsaw Pact invasion. She went to work for Radio Free Europe, beginning her career in journalism, and published her first article in The New York Times Magazine in 1970 titled, "Prague, Two Years After." The article covered life after the invasion.

After living for several years in Eastern Europe, Cole moved back to the United States to San Francisco, where she took a position at the Saturday Review as an editor and writer. In the late 1970s, she also worked as an editor and writer for Newsday, where she wrote on subjects from politics to travel, women's issues, and education. Her articles also appeared in such publications as Omni, People, Glamour, Psychology Today, The New York Times, Newsweek, The Washington Post, Seventeen, and The New York Daily News.

Cole's first foray into novel writing focused on issues of feminism and motherhood. In 1980, Doubleday published her novel, What Only a Mother Can Tell You About Having a Baby. In 1982, Doubleday published her book, Between the Lines: Searching for the Space Between Feminism and Femininity and Other Tight Spots. Both books were well-received with a write-up in Time Magazine for the former and a series of excerpts published in The Milwaukee Journal from the latter.

== Science writing ==
=== Frank Oppenheimer and the Exploratorium ===
While living and writing in San Francisco, Cole was handed a magazine assignment to write about the Exploratorium, an innovative science museum. At the time, she had no interest in studying science, but her experience with the Exploratorium changed that. She avidly pursued an independent study of physics with the help of the Exploratorium staff, and developed a friendship with the Exploratorium's founder and the "uncle of the atomic bomb", Frank Oppenheimer, who became her mentor. Her experiences with Oppenheimer and the Exploratorium inspired her to pursue science writing.

=== Journalism ===
Cole first wrote about science themes for the New York Times in its column series "Hers" and in individual magazine features. Focusing primarily on physics and math, she went on to write a science column for The Washington Post, and her science articles have appeared in the Esquire, Smithsonian, Lear's, The New Yorker, the Columbia Journalism Review, and other publications. She wrote and edited for Discover magazine for years, sharing a column with Stephen Jay Gould and Lewis Thomas. In 1994, Cole began covering physical science for The Los Angeles Times in a column called "Mind Over Matter," which was later collected in book form. She left The Los Angeles Times to pursue teaching at the University of Southern California, but has continued to contribute to The Los Angeles Times periodically.

Her science journalism has appeared in prestigious collections including The Best American Science Writing in 2004 and 2005, and in The Best American Science and Nature Writing in 2002.

=== Books ===
In the mid-1980s, Cole began writing nonfiction science books. In 1985, Bantam published Sympathetic Vibrations: Reflections on Physics as a Way of Life with a foreword by Frank Oppenheimer. The book was based on Cole's New York Times "Hers" and Discover columns, and an expanded 2nd edition was published in 1999 under the title First You Build a Cloud: And Other Reflections on Physics as a Way of Life.

In 1998, Mariner published Cole's second science book The Universe and the Teacup: The Mathematics of Truth and Beauty, a national bestseller that has been translated into twelve languages. In 2001, Mariner published The Hole in the Universe: How Scientists Peered over the Edge of Emptiness and Found Everything. In 2009, she published a book about her friend, mentor, and colleague Frank Oppenheimer called Something Incredibly Wonderful Happens: Frank Oppenheimer and the World He Made Up.

=== Radio commentaries ===
Cole is a frequent radio commentator. She appeared on American Public Media's Marketplace, and her past science commentaries for KPCC (Southern California Public Radio) spanned topics from "The Magic of String Theory" to "The Evolution of Evidence." She has also commented for the BBC World Service and WYNC Studio's Science Friday.

== Teaching ==
Cole is a retired professor from the University of Southern California's (USC) Annenberg School for Communication and Journalism. She has also taught science writing at Yale and Wesleyan universities, and was a professor of Science, Society and Communication at the University of California, Los Angeles (UCLA). She's been actively involved with the Journalism and Women Symposium (JAWS) and PEN Center USA West. She is a science writer-in-residence at the Annenberg Public Policy Center at the University of Pennsylvania for 2019–20.

== Art and science ==
In keeping with the spirit of the Exploratorium in San Francisco, Cole engages in exploring connections between art, science, politics, etc. She helped to found an ongoing series of events, held first at Cornelia Street Café in New York, and later at the Santa Monica Art Studios, called "Categorically Not!" Each event involved people from three different fields (from physics to the arts) discussing a common theme, such as Nothingness, or Fluid Dynamics. Speakers have included Oliver Sacks and Roald Hoffmann.

== Awards and honors ==
- 1984, Exploratorium's Public Understanding of Science Award, presented by Frank Oppenheimer
- 1995, American Institute of Physics Science Writing award
- 1998, Skeptics Society Edward R. Murrow Award "for thoughtful coverage of scientific controversies"
- 1998, Los Angeles Times Award for Deadline Reporting
- 1999, Los Angeles Times award for Explanatory Journalism
- 2001, Elizabeth A. Wood Science Writing Award, American Crystallographic Association
- 2007, Lifetime Honorary Member, Sigma Xi
- 2013, EMMA (Exceptional Merit in Media Award), National Women's Political Caucus for her article "Why does ‘CEO’ mean ‘white male’?" in the Los Angeles Times.
- USC "Remarkable Woman Faculty Member"

== Bibliography ==
- Cole, K.C. (1978). Vision : in the eye of the beholder. San Francisco, Calif.: Exploratorium.
- Cole, K. C. (1980). What only a mother can tell you about having a baby. Garden City, N.Y.: Anchor Press.
- Cole, K.C. (1980). Facets of light : colors, images, and things that glow in the dark. San Francisco, Calif: Exploratorium.
- Cole, K.C. (1982). Between the lines : searching for the space between feminism and femininity and other tight spots. Garden City, NY: Anchor Press/Doubleday. ISBN 0385172311.
- Cole, K. C. (1985). Sympathetic vibrations : reflections on physics as a way of life / K.C. Cole; foreword by Frank Oppenheimer. New York: W. Morrow.
  - 2nd expanded edition: Cole, K.C. (1999). First you build a cloud : and other reflections on physics as a way of life. San Diego: Harcourt Brace.
- Cole, K.C. (1998). Universe and the teacup : the mathematics of truth and beauty. New York: Harcourt Brace.
- Cole, K.C. (2001). Hole in the universe : how scientists peered over the edge of emptiness and found everything. New York: Harcourt.
- Cole, K.C. (2003). Mind over matter : conversations with the cosmos. Orlando: Harcourt.
- Cole, K.C. (2009). Something incredibly wonderful happens : Frank Oppenheimer and the world he made up. Boston: Houghton Mifflin Harcourt.
