= Daniel Loxton =

Canadian writer (born 1975)

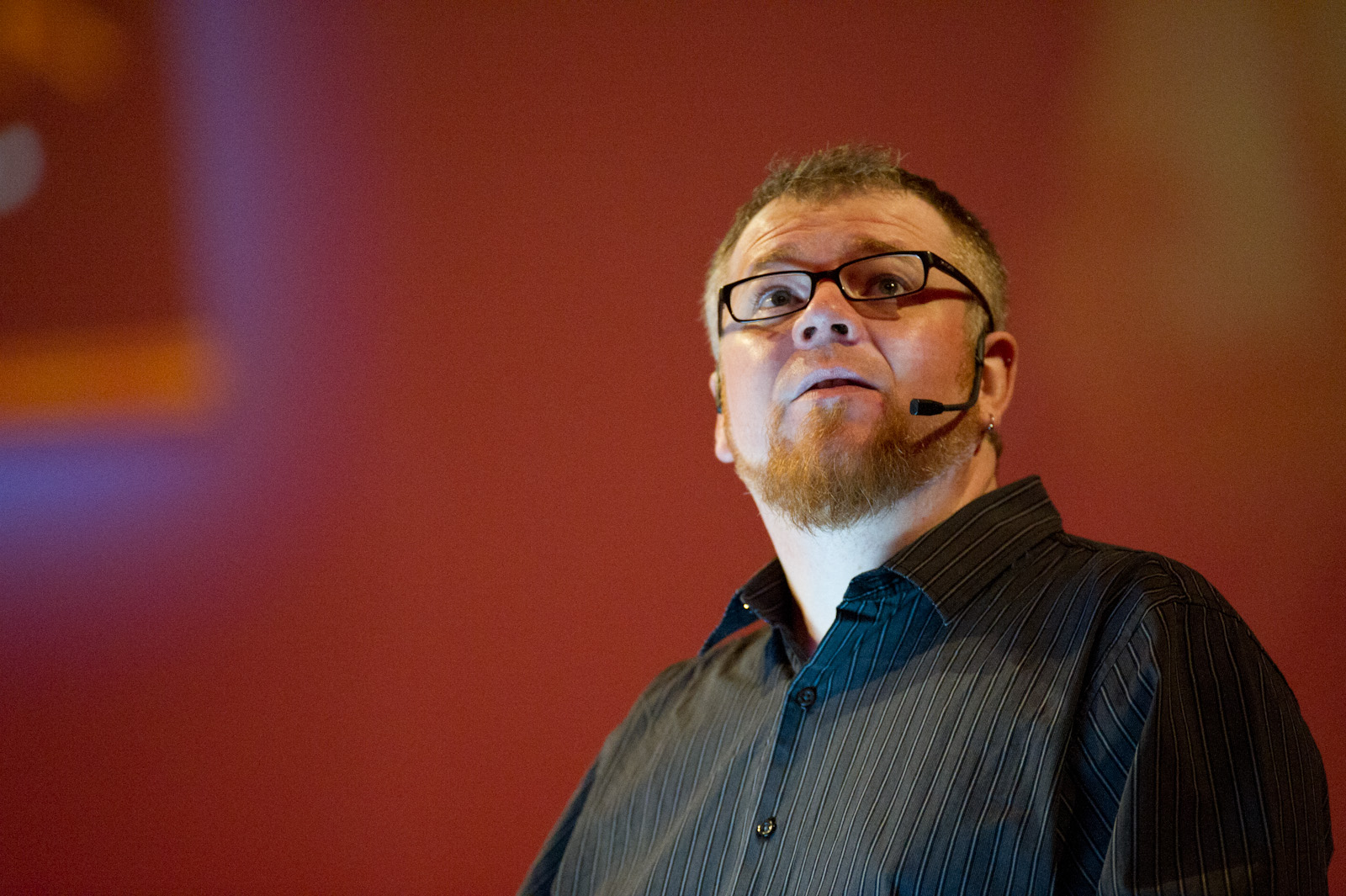
- Daniel Loxton
- Occupations: Writer, editor

Daniel Loxton (born 1975) is a Canadian writer, illustrator, and skeptic. He wrote or co-wrote several books including Tales of Prehistoric Life, a children's science trilogy, and Abominable Science!, a scientific look at cryptozoology. As editor of Junior Skeptic, Loxton writes and illustrates most issues of Junior Skeptic, a children's science section in the Skeptics Society's Skeptic magazine.

Loxton has written articles for critical thinking publications including eSkeptic, Skeptic, Skeptical Briefs, and the Skeptical Inquirer as well as contributed cover art to Skeptic, Yes, and Free Inquiry. From 2009 to 2014 he regularly contributed to Skepticblog, a collaboration blog promoting science, critical thinking, and skepticism. Since 2014, Loxton has been the editor of The Skeptics Society's INSIGHT.

== Early life ==
Loxton credits Barry Beyerstein for his interest in skepticism. In several interviews Loxton talks about attending a science fiction conference in British Columbia in 1991 and hearing Beyerstein speak on behalf of the BC Skeptics. "He calmly and kindly fielded questions from the audience—and I was shocked by almost everything he said. This wasn’t the usual fluff: this guy really knew what he was talking about, in a way that I had never encountered before. Even his 'I don’t know's were substantial in a way that I wasn’t used to hearing."

Loxton worked as a professional shepherd in British Columbia on the Canadian side of the Alaska Panhandle.

== Career ==
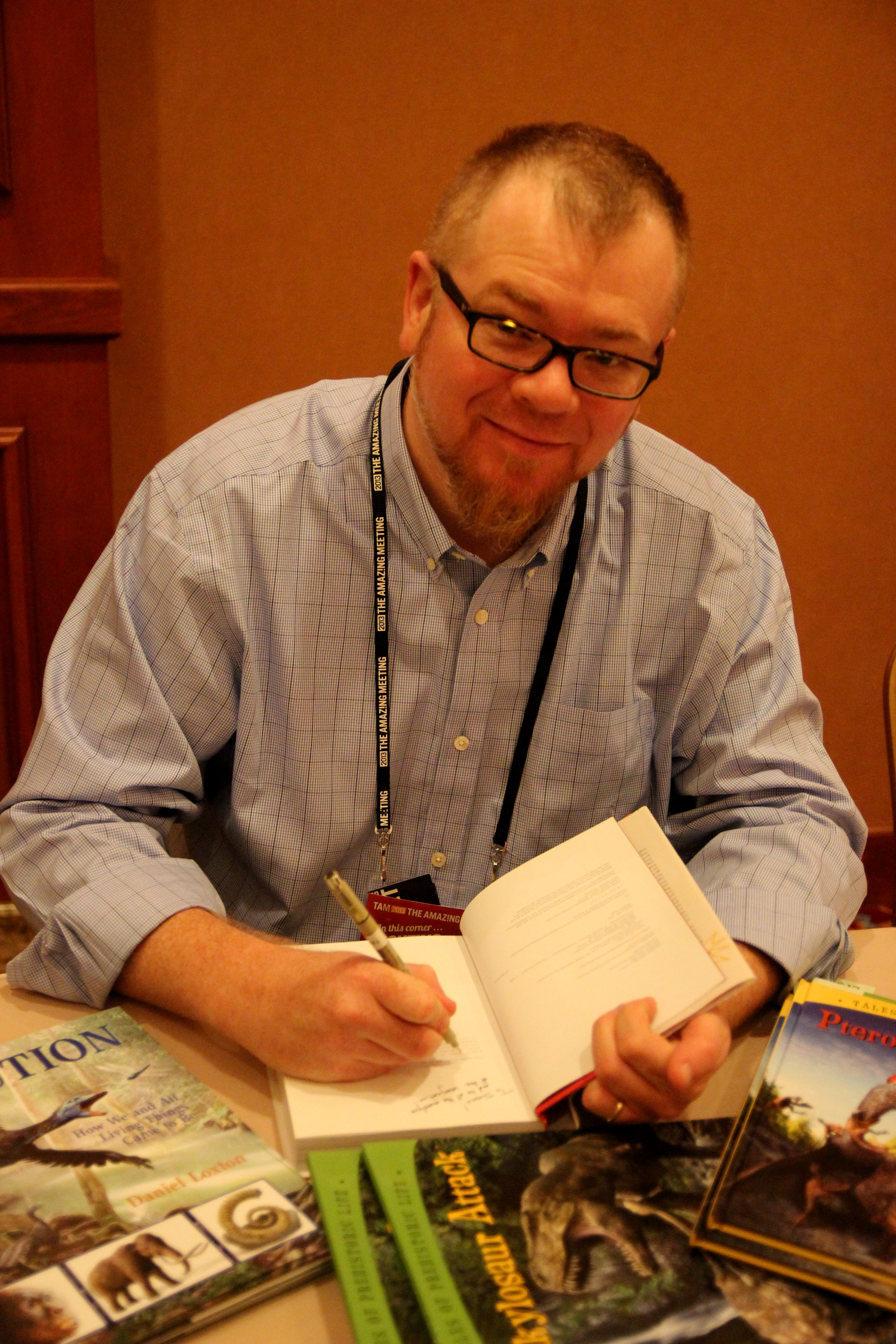
Loxton at book signing TAM 2013

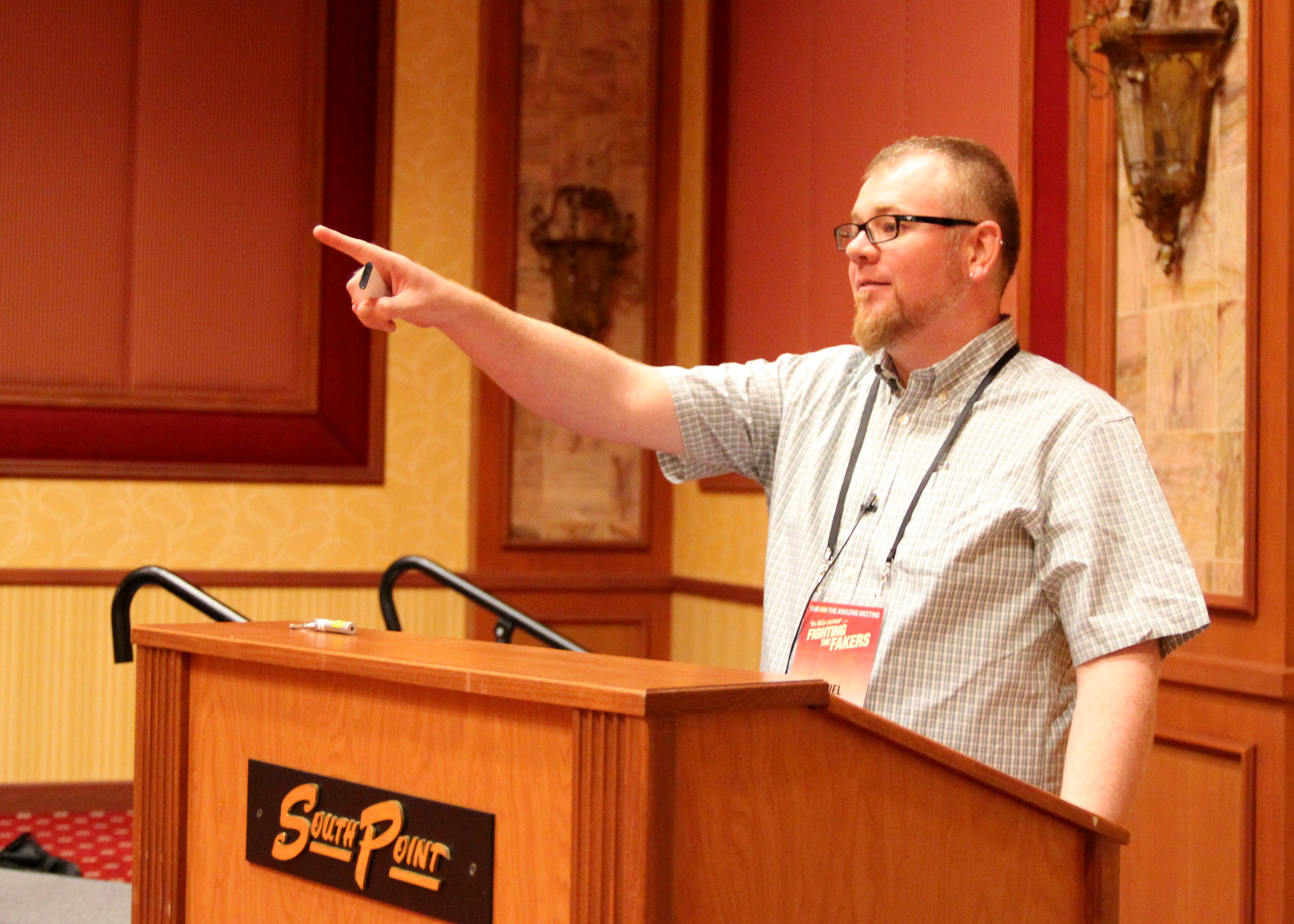
Loxton at podium at TAM 2013 - Preserving Skeptic History

Loxton has published articles on skeptical activism. In 2007, he wrote "Where Do We Go From Here?" about the direction of the new generation of skepticism, and which helped to inspire the SkeptiCamp community organized conferences on scientific skepticism. Then in 2009, he wrote "What Do I Do Next?" providing ideas for individual involvement in the skepticism movement, which was featured on an episode of the Skepticality podcast. In 2014, he wrote "Why Is There a Skeptical Movement?" which explores "the roots, founding principles, and purpose of scientific skepticism. Arguing that it is essential for skeptics to "appreciate that we’re caretakers for the work of those who have come before," Loxton carries forward the discussion about the scope and limits of scientific skepticism that has been raised again in recent days".

Loxton is the author of Evolution: How We and All Living Things Came To Be, which was nominated for the Canadian Children's Book Centre's Norma Fleck Award for Children's Non-Fiction and won the Lane Anderson Award (a $10,000 prize). When pitching Evolution to U.S. publishers, Loxton was told, "‘Well of course I love it, but we just think it’s a little too hot,’... Which is a strange thing to say about fundamental biology." Not so in Canada. About writing a children's book on the topic of evolution Loxton states, "People forget to see kids as thinking beings, as people who have existential questions that they want answered. They just need the best information available," he said. "Keep it simple, but make it true."

In 2011, he wrote Ankylosaur Attack (Tales of Prehistoric Life), which was nominated for a Forest of Reading Silver Birch Express award from the Ontario Library Association. He also appeared in an interview on the JREF podcast, For Good Reason in the episode dated February 6, 2010 and on Christopher Brown's Meet the Skeptics! podcast.

In 2013, he co-authored Abominable Science!.

In 2015, Loxton was elected a fellow of the Committee for Skeptical Inquiry.

== Books ==
- Loxton, Daniel (2010), Evolution: How We and All Living Things Came to Be, Kids Can Press, p. 56, ISBN 978-1554534302 (translated into Slovenian, Korean, Norwegian, Persian, and, in a modified form as the separate book Evolução, Portuguese).
- Loxton, Daniel; Smith, Jim W.W. (2011), Ankylosaur Attack, (Tales of Prehistoric Life), Kids Can Press, pp. 32, ISBN 978-1554536313
- Loxton, Daniel; Smith, Jim W.W. (2013), Pterosaur Trouble, (Tales of Prehistoric Life), Kids Can Press, pp. 32, ISBN 978-1554536320
- Loxton, Daniel; Prothero, Donald R (2013), Abominable Science!: Origins of the Yeti, Nessie, and Other Famous Cryptids, Columbia University Press, pp. 432, ISBN 978-0231153201
- Loxton, Daniel; Smith, Jim W.W. (2014), Plesiosaur Peril, (Tales of Prehistoric Life), Kids Can Press, p. 32, ISBN 978-1554536337
