= SkeptiCamp =

Small grassroots conference for scientific skeptics)

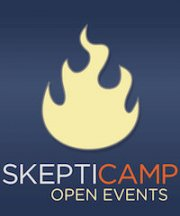
- SkeptiCamp Open Events
- Founded: 2007; 19 years ago
- Founder: Reed Esau
- Type: Nonprofit
- Key people: Daniel Loxton, Reed Esau

SkeptiCamp was founded by Reed Esau in 2007 and is small grassroots conference where scientific skeptics come together and participate and present. Skepticamps are held in varying formats worldwide and are operated in the style of an unconference.

== History ==
=== Background ===
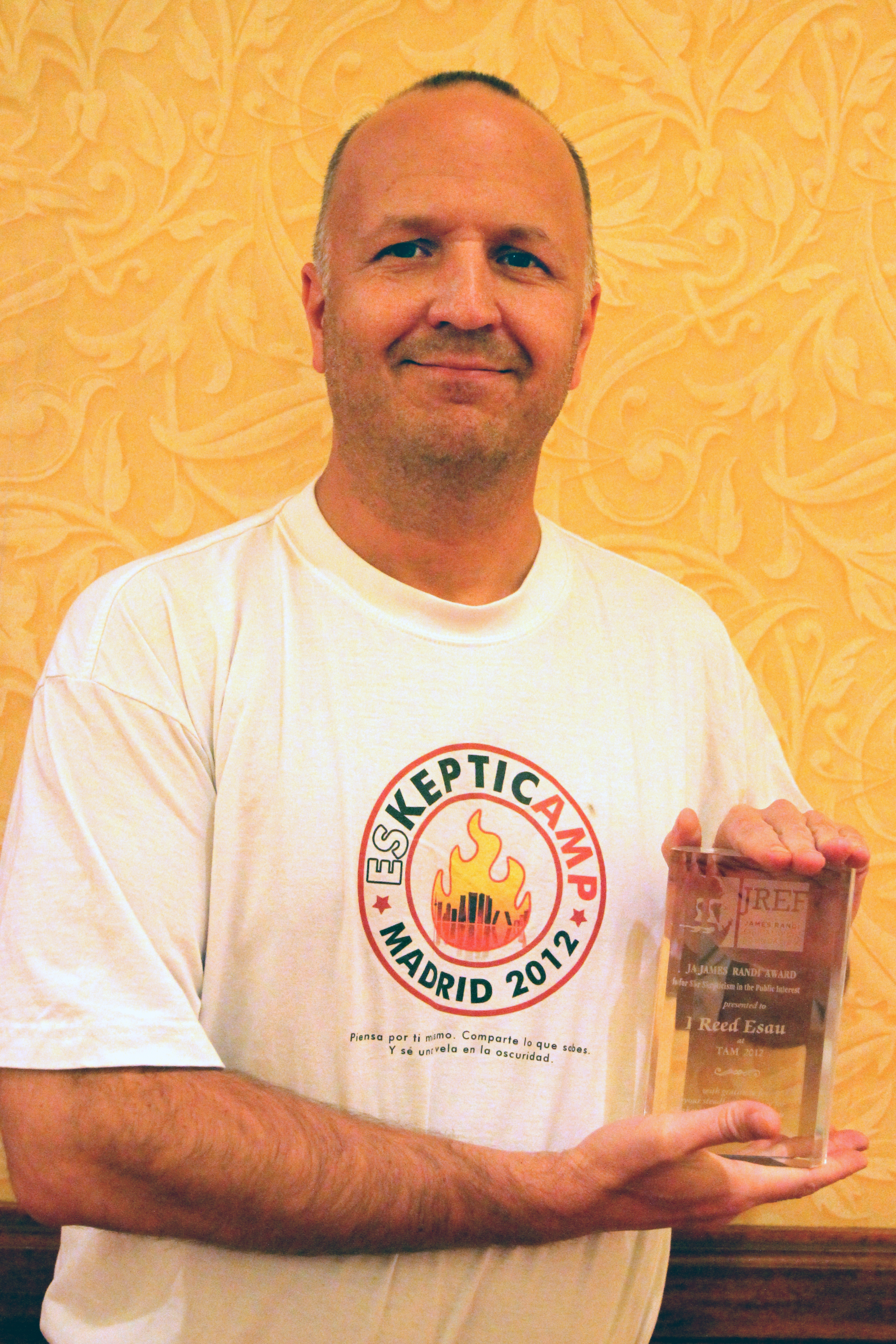
Reed Esau founder of SkeptiCamp, with JREF award

The SkeptiCamp concept was founded in 2007 by Reed Esau. It was partially inspired by Daniel Loxton's 2007 essay on the state of the Skeptical movement, "Where Do We Go From Here?", and from attending The Amaz!ng Meeting in 2007, an annual conference that focuses on science, skepticism, and critical thinking.

SkeptiCamps can be "loosely organized", the format also allows ad hoc group formation, and avoids the overhead associated with more formal content channels.

=== Events ===
The first SkeptiCamp was held in August 2007 in Denver, and was organized by Reed Esau along with Rich Ludwig and Crystal Yates-White. Since that first event, over one hundred other events have been held in cities such as Winnipeg, Manitoba; Colorado Springs; Nashua, New Hampshire; Chicago, Illinois; and Seaside, California.

In January 2018 Monterey County Skeptics ran their 4th Skepticamp at Seaside; and in February 2018 Fort Collins held their 8th consecutive annual skepticamp.

==== SpeedyCamps ====
Just as SkeptiCamps are slimmed down versions of larger skeptic's conferences such as CSICon, a SpeedyCamp is a slimmed down version of a SkeptiCamp. SpeedyCamps are a platform for more inexperienced speakers to make a presentation in 15 minute time slots which includes time for attendees to ask the speaker questions or to make comments. Topics are similar to the larger SkeptiCamps, and include presentations centered around Scientific Skepticism.

==== Outside the United States ====
The first SkeptiCamp in Australia was run by the Australian Skeptics on April 30, 2011, at the University of Technology Sydney. 100 people attended the 7 hour event and discussed a broad range of topics from the conflict in the Middle East to genetically modified food and clinical trials in the United States. Melbourne SkeptiCamp followed on October 22, 2011, at the University of Melbourne, then shortly afterwards the Surf Coast Summer SkeptiCamp was launched on January 21, 2012, at the Aireys Inlet Community Hall. In 2015, the Australian National Skeptics Convention kicked off with the 100th worldwide SkeptiCamp in Brisbane. Eight local skeptics participated as speakers and the event concluded with a panel discussion. The science on top podcast was recorded live at the 2018 Surf Coast Summer Skepticamp. Skepticamps are held annually in Australia at the Surf Coast, Canberra, and Brisbane.

The first Skepticamps in Canada took place in Vancouver in 2008 and 2009 and one was organized in Edmonton in July 2010. Then on October 23, 2010, simultaneous SkeptiCamps were held in four Canadian cities: Vancouver, Winnipeg, Ottawa and Toronto. Ottawa and Vancouver continued to host Skepticamps most years since 2010, while the most recent one in Edmonton took place in 2011, in Winnipeg in 2014.

In the United Kingdom, Edinburgh had a Skepticamp every year between 2009 and 2012. London had one in 2013 and Manchester every year since 2014.

In Spain, Madrid and Alicante both had a Skepticamp in 2012.

Under the name SciCamp, a Skepticamp took place in Uppsala (Sweden) in 2012.

NZ Skeptics help a Skepticamp in Wellington in 2014.

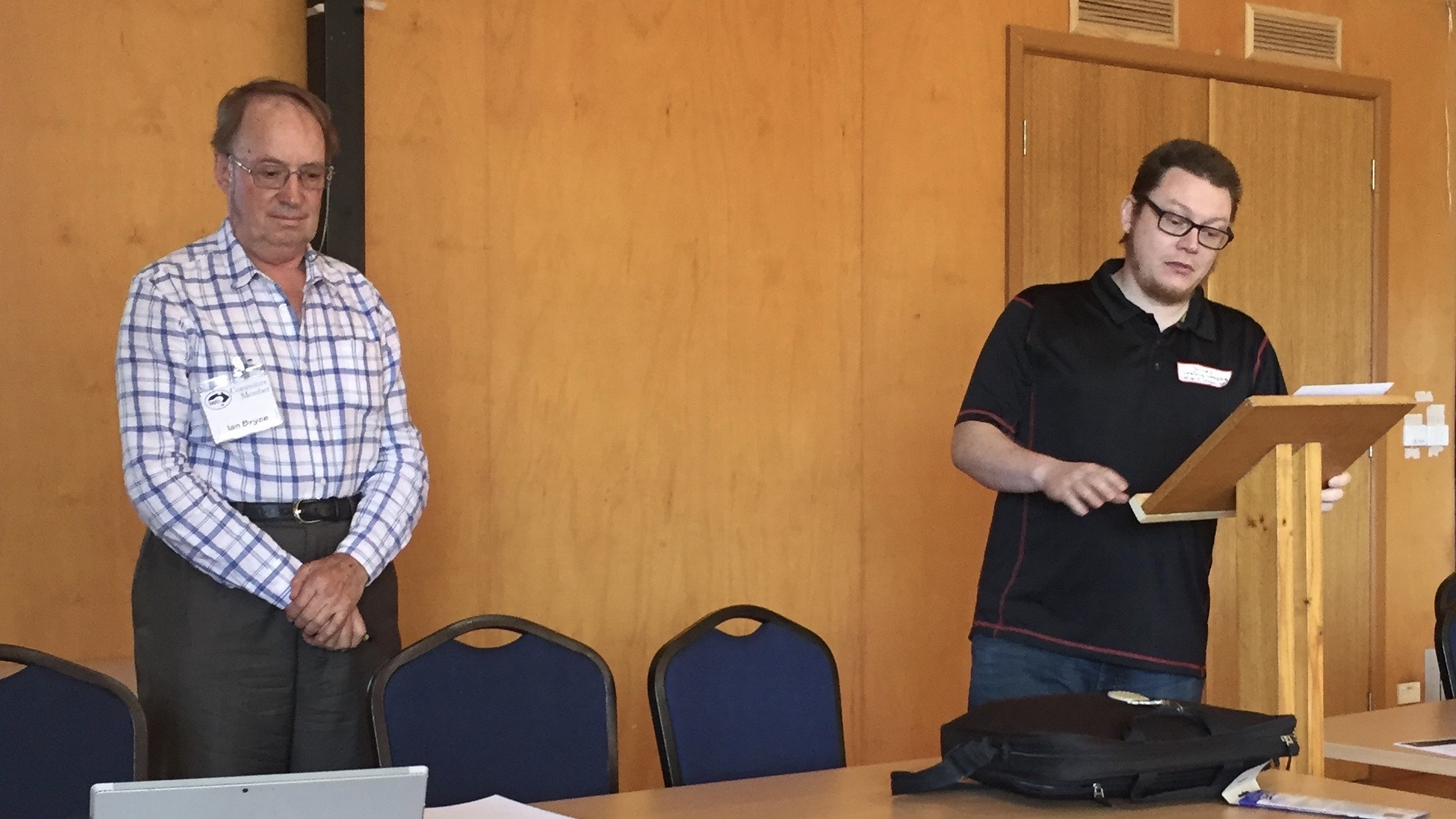
James Rolton introduces Ian Bryce, who spoke about the Australian Skeptics $100 000 Challenge. Surf Coast Skepticamp on February 17, 2018.

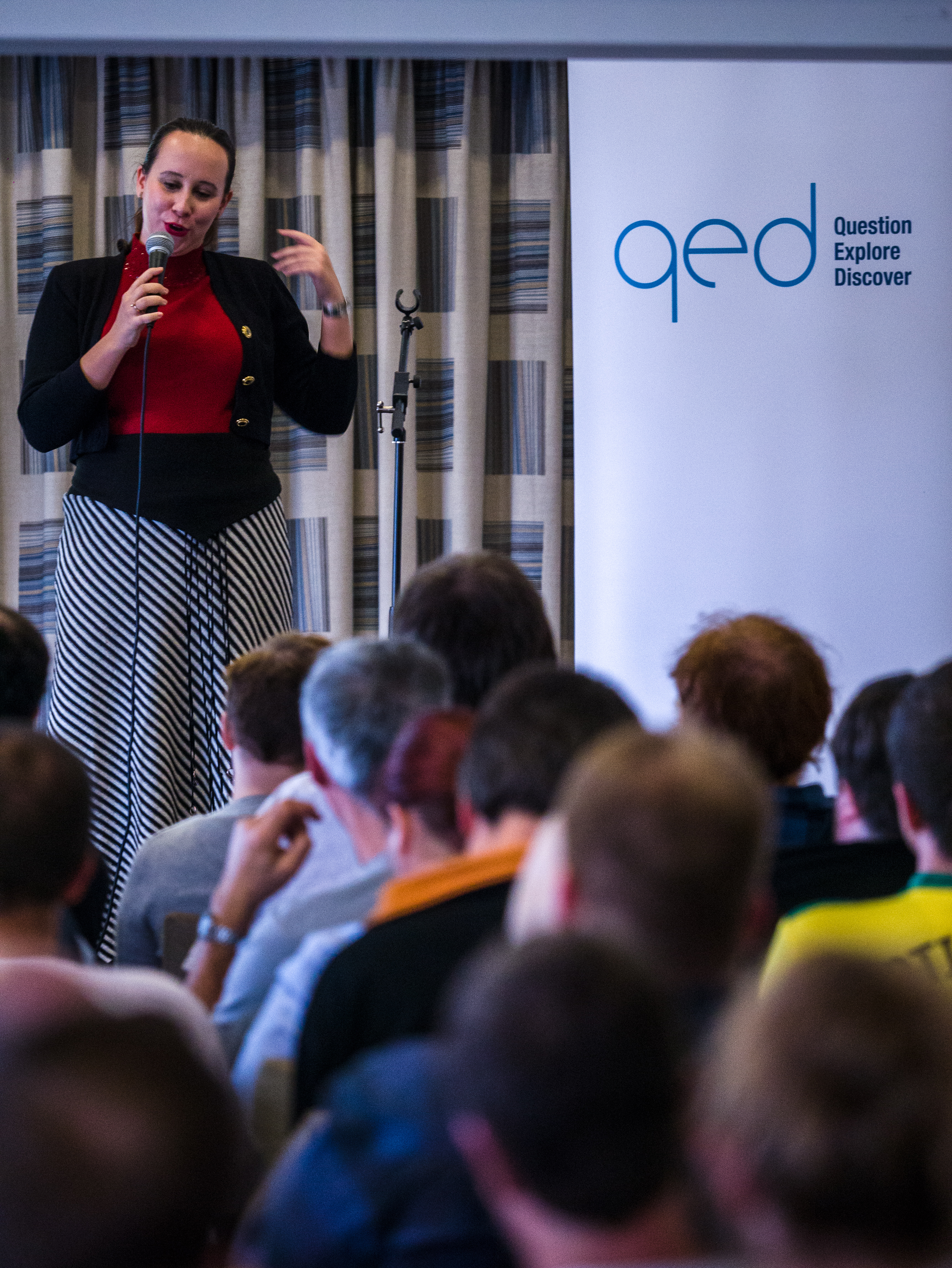
Claire Klingenberg talks at Skepticamp at QEDCon 2016 in Manchester.

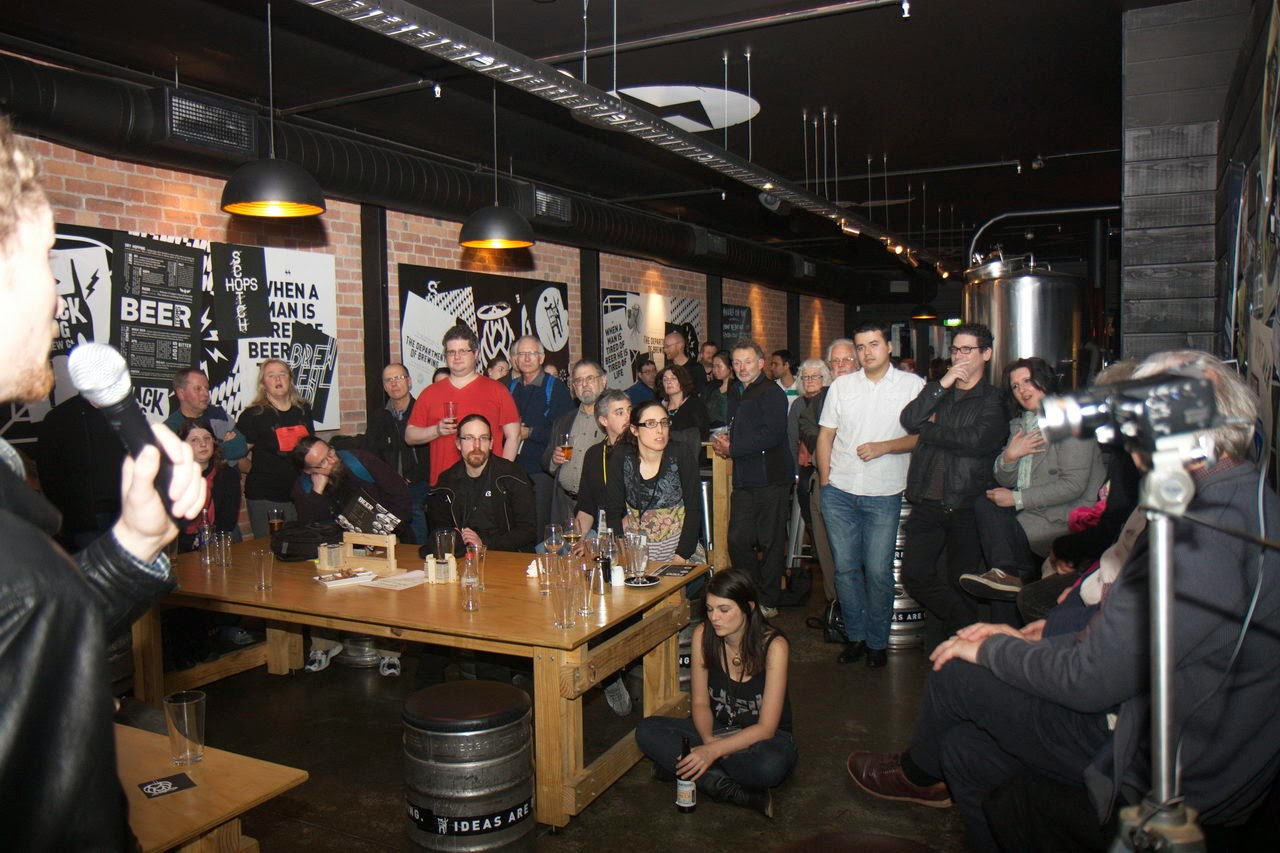
SkeptiCamp in Wellington 2013

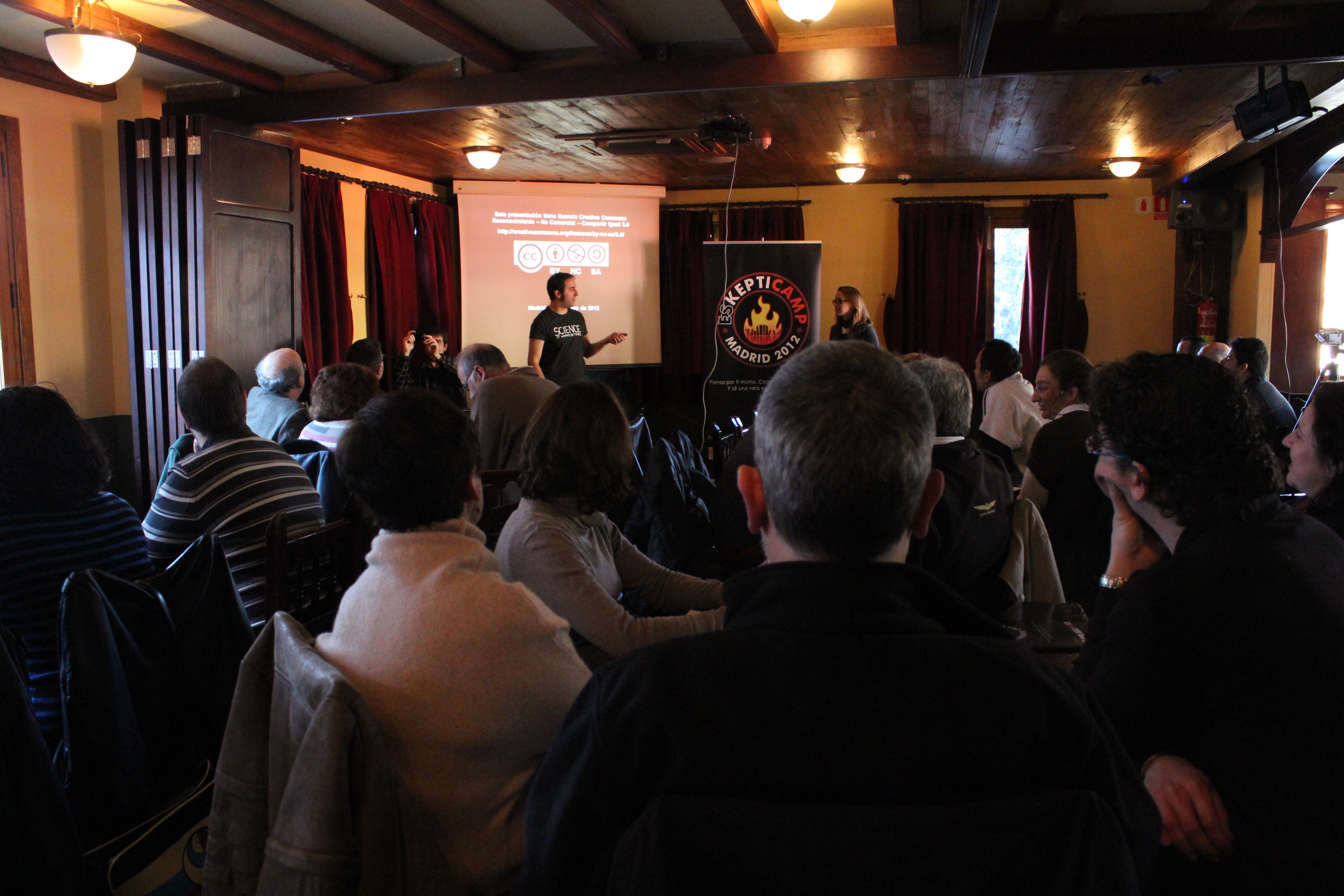
Luis Garcia Castro and Daniela Meli during the SkeptiCamp Madrid 2012 Opening

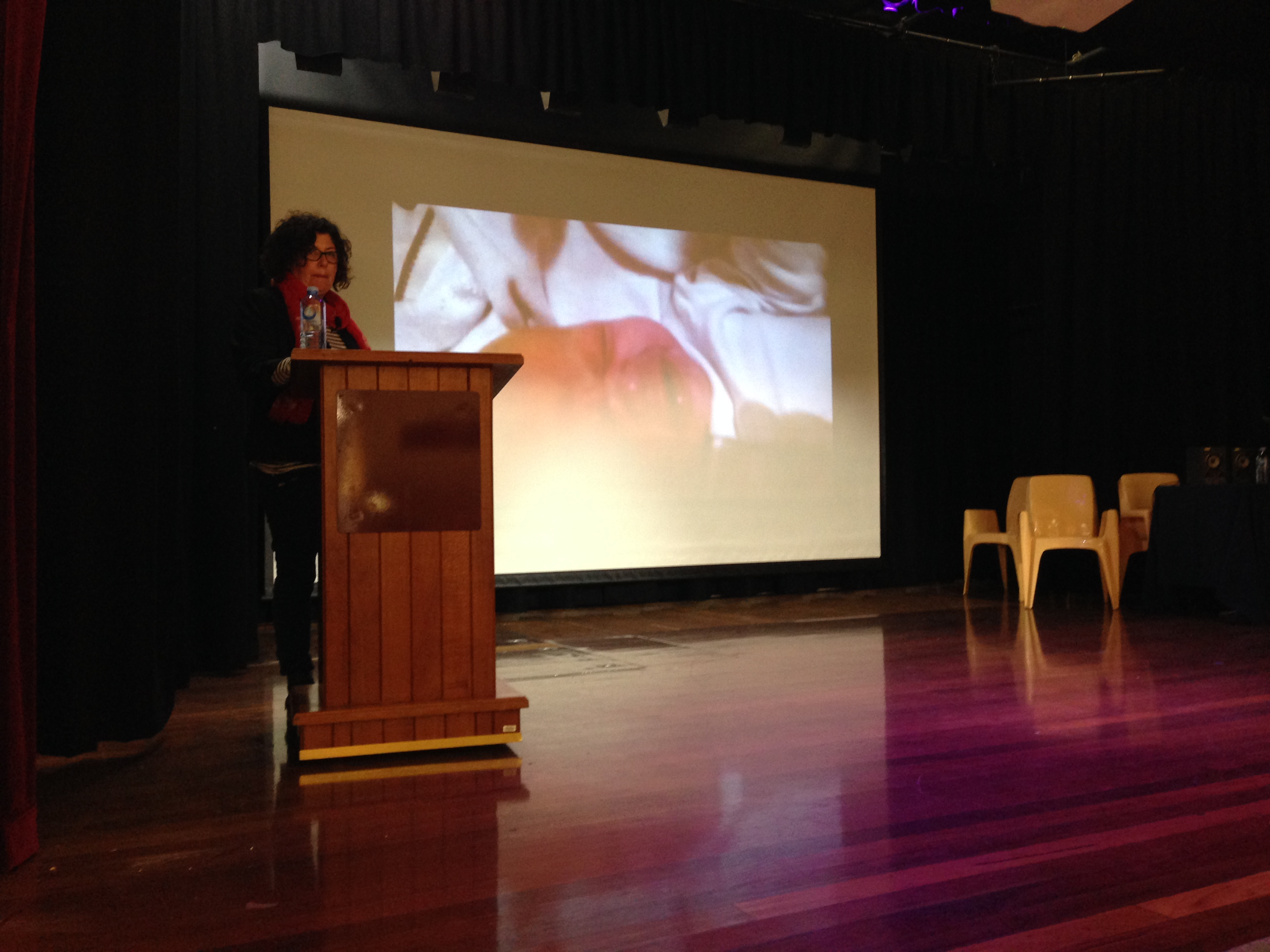
Alison Gaylard of NRVS speaking at the 2014 Brisbane SkeptiCamp

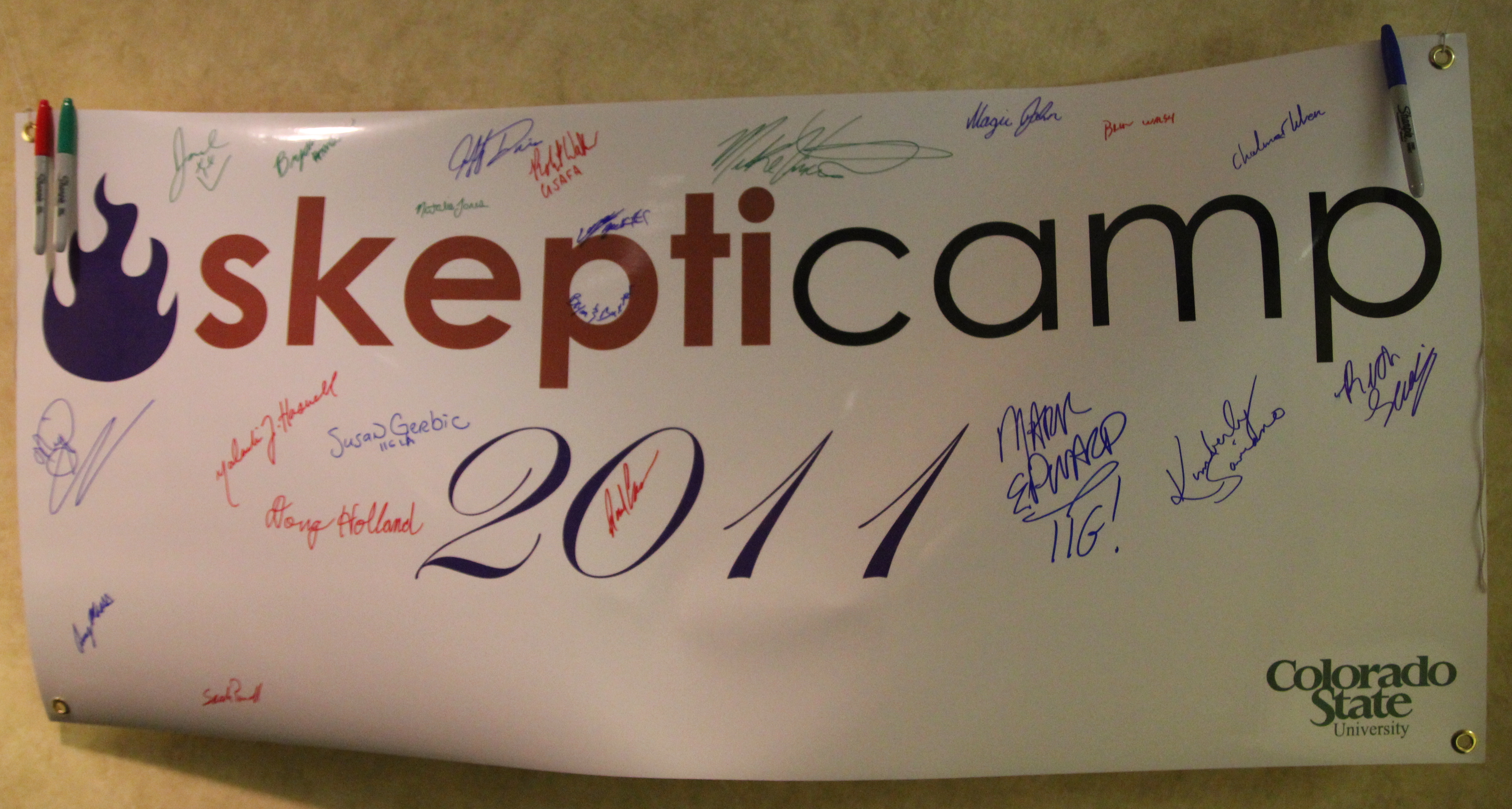
Fort Collins, Colorado, 2011

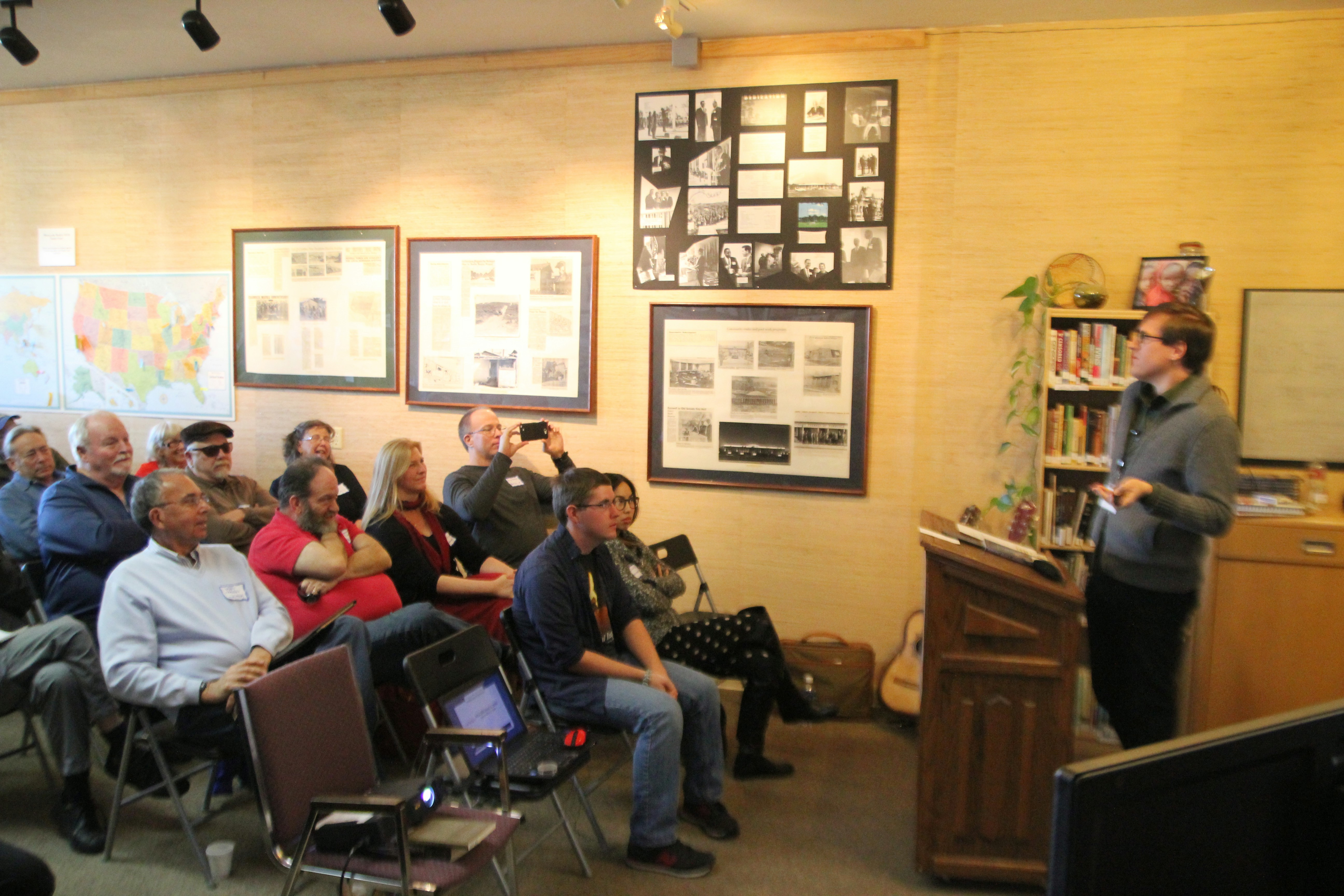
Kyle Polich lectures at SkeptiCamp 2015

== See also ==
- Café Scientifique
- Nerd Nite
