= Tim Farley =

Software engineer & skeptic (born 1962)

Timothy Patrick Farley
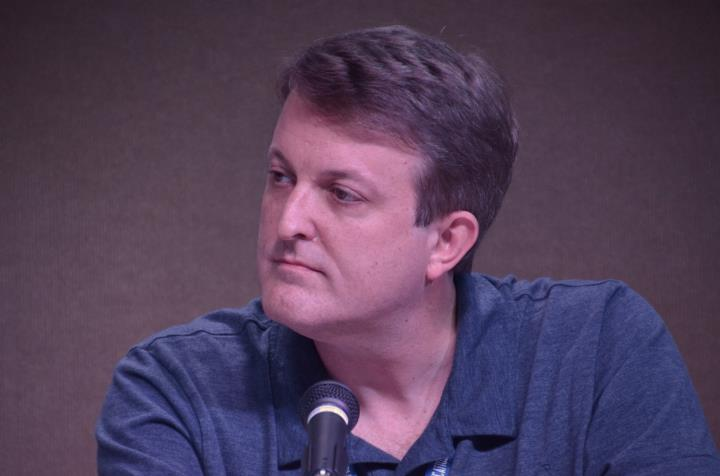
- At Dragon*Con 2011
- Born: August 12, 1962 (age 64); Edison, New Jersey, US
- Known for: Skepticism, podcaster, computer security, computer software engineer
- Website: http://whatstheharm.net http://skeptools.com

Timothy Patrick Farley (born August 12, 1962) is a computer software engineer, writer and instructor who lives in Atlanta, Georgia. He is an expert in computer security and reverse engineering as well as a skeptic. He was a research fellow of the James Randi Educational Foundation. Tim Farley is the creator of the website What's The Harm?, a resource where stories are documented and categorized about the damage done when people fail to use critical thinking skills. Farley was also instrumental in the apprehension of spammer "David Mabus."

== Early life ==
Farley was born in 1962 and grew up in Edison, New Jersey. He later lived in Valdosta, Georgia and in Atlanta, Georgia.

While in high school and college, Farley was involved in Star Trek fandom and wrote for and edited several fanzines. Most of his writing was non-fiction, examining the science of Star Trek such as the technology shown. In 1985 Farley created the Star Trek Historical Calendar which related science, cartoons and historical facts associated with the series. This venture in college he credits with guiding his later interests in his "This day in skeptic history" project. He was also president of two different Star Trek fan clubs at different times: VISTAS in Valdosta and ASTRA in Atlanta. Later he worked on the staff of several Atlanta-area conventions including Atlanta Fantasy Fair and Dragon Con.

== Professional career ==
His professional career has been in software development, specializing in network communications, computer security and reverse engineering of binary software. He has worked for several Atlanta-area software companies including SemWare, Magee Enterprises, Internet Security Systems, and SPI Dynamics among others.

He has written a number of articles for computer periodicals about programming, computer networking and other topics. He has also written a chapter for a book on computer networking. As an expert in reverse engineering he has been quoted in BYTE Magazine and contributed material to the book Undocumented DOS and other books.

He has participated in computer industry standards committees and has presented at computer industry conferences. He has received three patents for his work in computer security. Farley has also worked as an instructor for commercial computer security training, including reverse engineering and secure application development.

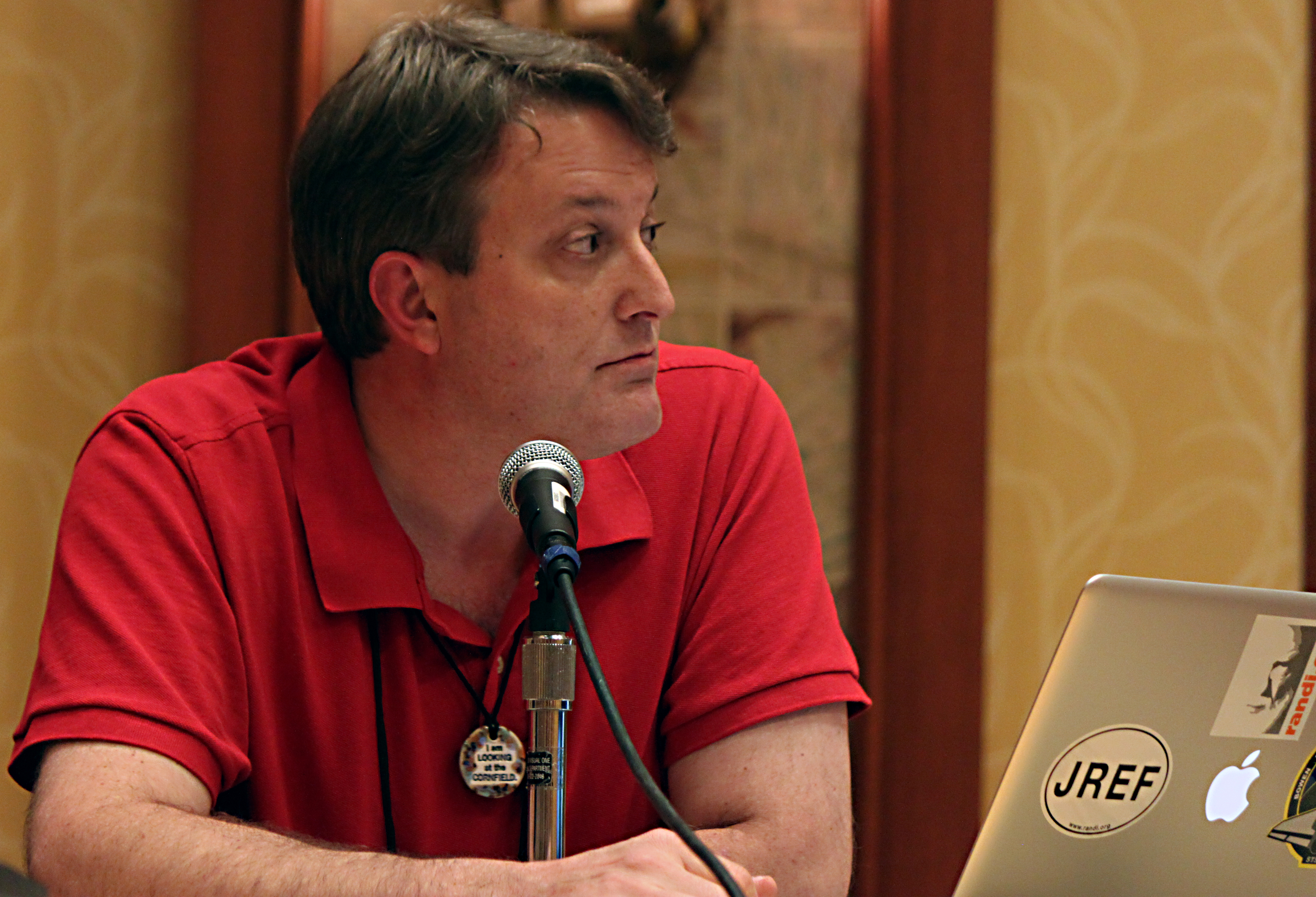
Tim Farley at TAM9, July 2011

== Career as a skeptic ==
Farley is the creator of the web site What's The Harm? which documents the damage done by mistaken beliefs, misinformation and pseudoscience.

In an interview with Richard Saunders on the Skeptic Zone podcast, Farley discussed how he wanted to try to stay focused on "concrete stories of people that actually got hurt" that he could cite with some kind of "decent documentation". He stated that he wanted to keep the format simple so that anyone could comfortably access the stories, on any browser with no flashy videos. He hopes to expand the site into longer feature stories of some of the more documented or popular stories. Saunders stated that the site "has a wealth of information, if someone asks you "what's the harm?", you can run to this website and see that the harm is... lack of critical thinking."

Farley has written on skeptical topics at his Skeptical Software Tools blog and elsewhere. He also been published in Skeptical Inquirer.

Farley has spoken at local skeptics meetings such as Skeptics in the Pub in Atlanta, Boston, Reno, Nevada, Washington, DC, Manchester, New Hampshire and Madison, Wisconsin. He presented at several SkeptiCamps including Atlanta in 2009, 2010 and 2011 and New York City in 2009.

Speaking at TAM 2012, Farley urged the audience of skeptics to become more involved spreading critical thinking on the Internet, just a few minutes each day. "We need more tools... we need people welding these tools, we need to be the army that is using these tools as weapons against the quacks and the psychics." He cautions skeptics not to get too comfortable thinking that science will always win, because it is right. "We may delude ourselves in thinking it [science] does not need our help." He listed many new software tools that are available on the Internet for free and are relatively easy to use, and he reminded the audience, "Our opponents are doing everything they can to push nonsense on the general public." In his final advice to attendees he stated "Spread out – Pay attention – Stop wasting your online time."

Farley was named one of the Top Skeptics of 2012 by the podcast The Skeptic's Guide to the Universe.

=== "David Mabus" ===
In August 2011, Farley played a role in the identification and apprehension of Dennis Markuze. Markuze, using the name David Mabus, was responsible for a campaign of online threats against skeptics and atheists for many years.

In June 2012, Markuze pleaded guilty "to uttering threats toward eight people" and received an 18-month suspended sentence. Farley, who had been threatened, stated for the Montreal Gazette that he believed Markuze had continued his threats against atheists right up to his sentencing. Markuze, through his attorney, denied it, but was soon re-arrested for violating conditions of his parole.

Markuze received a sentence in June 2015. It includes three years during which he is required to follow the treatment of a psychiatrist and take prescribed medications. He is also prohibited from communicating in any way with Farley.

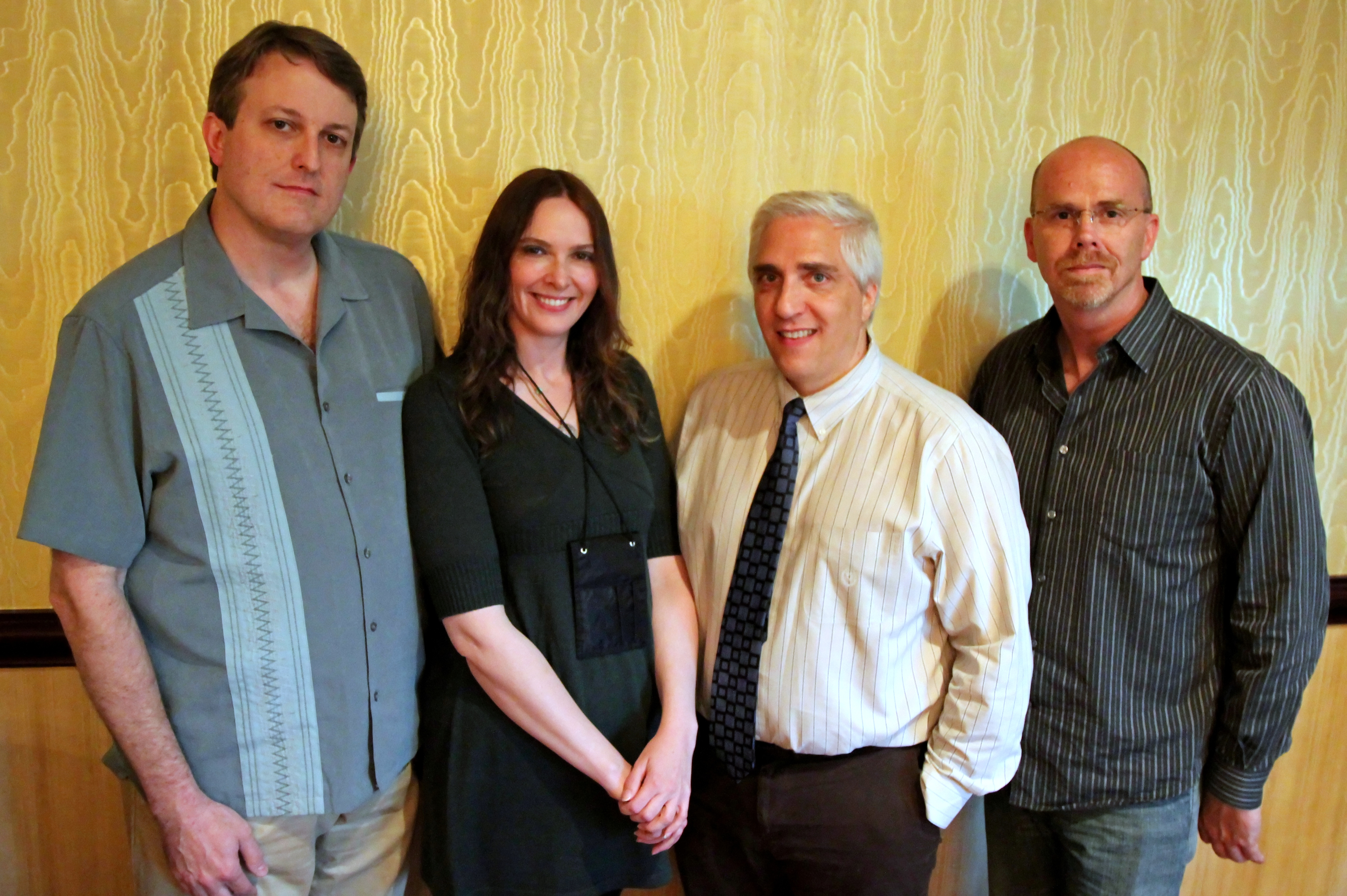
Four JREF fellows: Tim Farley, Karen Stollznow, Steven Novella & Ray Hall. Portrait taken at The Amaz!ng Meeting TAM9 from Outer Space July 16, 2011.

=== James Randi Educational Foundation ===
Farley has been affiliated with the James Randi Educational Foundation for several years. He gave a presentation at The Amaz!ng Meeting 6 in July 2008 entitled "Building Internet Tools for Skeptics." Farley was a featured guest at The Amazing Meeting 7 in July 2009 where he led a workshop titled "Introduction to Skepticism & the Skeptic Web" and also presented a paper with Christian Walters titled "How Are We Doing? Attracting and Keeping Visitors to Skeptic Web Sites." He also gave a presentation and sat on a panel during The Amaz!ng Adventure 4 and gave another presentation on The Amaz!ng Adventure 5.

In June 2011, Farley was named a research fellow by the organization. He researched the information in the organization's Today in Skeptic History iPhone app and writes for JREF's blog. In February 2014, Farley's position as a JREF Fellow ended.

At TAM 2012, Farley's lectures focused on improving activism (and reducing slacktivism) in the skeptical movement. His lectures included the workshop, The Future of Skepticism Online: Crowd-Sourced Activism and a panel Future of Skepticism with D. J. Grothe, Reed Esau, Barbara Drescher and Jamy Ian Swiss.

=== Podcasting & other media ===
Farley has been interviewed on the Skepticality podcast three times. As of Skepticality #123 he regularly appears on the program to present a short segment called A Few Minutes of Skeptic History. He has also appeared on the Skepchick podcast, Jeff Cutler's Bowl of Cheese, Skeptically Speaking on CJSR-FM, American Freethought, Nonsense Podcast, The Reality Check, Point of Inquiry, Take 5 on CIUT-FM, Skeptic Zone, Meet the Skeptics, the Norwegian podcast Saltklypa, Search Engine with Jesse Brown and WPRR's Reality Check.
