= Theresa Caputo =

American television personality and medium

- Born: Theresa Brigandi; June 10, 1967 (age 59); Hicksville, New York, U.S.
- Other name: Long Island Medium
- Occupation: Television personality
- Years active: 2011–present
- Known for: Long Island Medium
- Spouse: Larry Caputo (m. 1989; div. 2018)
- Children: Larry Caputo Jr., Victoria Caputo

Theresa Caputo (born June 10, 1967) is an American psychic medium, best known for her TLC reality television series Long Island Medium.

== Early life ==
Caputo, the daughter of Nicholas and Veronica Brigandi, was born and raised in Hicksville, New York, on Long Island. She has a brother, Michael. Their father was a volunteer firefighter and worked for the Nassau County Department of Public Works until 1980 when he was elected county water commissioner.

== Career ==
Caputo was on the TLC reality TV series Long Island Medium from 2011 to 2019. She is also the author of four books and tours under "Theresa Caputo Live! The Experience". On January 25, 2024, Theresa returned to TV with her new series, Theresa Caputo: Raising Spirits on the Lifetime network.

== Criticism ==
Several people have raised doubts about her powers, including Inside Edition and Jezebel. D. J. Grothe called on Caputo to prove her abilities, and James Randi said her claims were not true.

In April 2012, the James Randi Educational Foundation awarded Caputo its Pigasus Award, a tongue-in-cheek award that seeks to expose parapsychological, paranormal or psychic frauds. The James Randi Education Foundation has been critical of Caputo's work.

A newspaper review of Caputo's performances at the NYCB Theatre at Westbury in late 2017 concluded, "For me, this unbelievable experience was simply that: not to be believed. In my humble opinion, Caputo is a damn good performer, and she's got undeniably likable sass and charisma. I just don't think she speaks with the dead. Or she didn't the night that I saw her. But my father probably could have told you that."

Paranormal investigator Massimo Polidoro calls Caputo a "performer" and reports on an investigation done by Inside Edition and mentalist Mark Edward who attended one of her live shows in 2012. In 2013, illusionist Criss Angel offered Caputo $1 million to prove her claims.

== Personal life ==
On December 3, 2017, Theresa and her husband Larry Caputo jointly announced they were separating after 28 years of marriage. They have two children, who have both appeared on the show: Larry Caputo Jr. and Victoria Caputo. On June 27, 2018, Larry Caputo, who moved to Los Angeles following the separation from Theresa, announced he and Theresa were moving from separation to divorce. In December 2018, Theresa Caputo announced the divorce had been finalized.

== Works and publications ==
- Caputo, Theresa; Grish, Kristina (2013). There's More to Life Than This: Healing Messages, Remarkable Stories, and Insight About the Other Side from the Long Island Medium (1st Atria Books hardcover ed.). Pocket Books. ISBN 978-1-4767-2703-5. OCLC 872588683.
- Caputo, Theresa (2014). You Can't Make This Stuff Up: Life Changing Lessons from Heaven. Pocket Books. ISBN 978-1-4767-6443-6. OCLC 903630815.
- Caputo, Theresa (2017). Good Grief: Heal Your Soul, Honor Your Loved Ones, and Learn to Live Again. Atria Books. ISBN 978-1-5011-3908-6. OCLC 956959045.

== See also ==
- Ann O'Delia Diss Debar
- Char Margolis
- Flim-Flam!
- Fortune telling fraud
- Houdini's debunking of psychics and mediums
- James Van Praagh
- John Edward
- Mark Edward
- Matt Fraser (psychic)
- Monica the Medium
- Televangelist Peter Popoff exposed by James Randi
- Psychic Blues: Confessions of a Conflicted Medium
- Psychic Friends Network
- Rose Mackenberg
- Sylvia Browne
- Thomas John Flanagan
- Tyler Henry
