= Ray Hyman =

American psychology professor (born 1928)

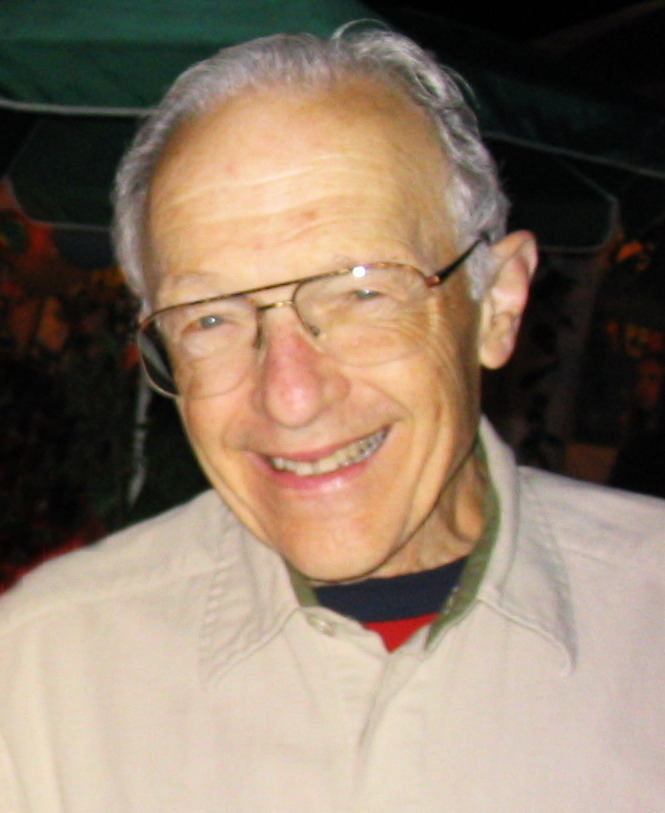
- Hyman in 2003
- Born: June 23, 1928 (age 98); Chelsea, Massachusetts, U.S.
- Education: Boston University; Johns Hopkins University
- Known for: Critic of parapsychology, research on Hick's Law
- Awards: In Praise of Reason Award (2003), Robert P. Balles Prize (2005), IIG Houdini Hall of Honor Award (2011)
- Scientific career
- Fields: Psychology
- Workplaces: University of Oregon; Harvard
- Ray Hyman's voice recorded October 2016 at CSICon

Ray Hyman (born June 23, 1928) is a professor emeritus of psychology at the University of Oregon in Eugene, Oregon, and a noted critic of parapsychology. Hyman, along with James Randi, Martin Gardner and Paul Kurtz, is one of the founders of the modern skeptical movement. He is the founder and leader of the Skeptic's Toolbox. Hyman serves on the Executive Council for the Committee for Skeptical Inquiry.

== Career ==
Hyman was born in Chelsea, Massachusetts, to a Jewish family. Although he was bar mitzvahed at 13, Hyman "never had a religious feeling". In his teenage years and later while attending Boston University, he worked as a magician and mentalist, impressing the head of his department (among others) with his palmistry. Hyman at one point believed that 'reading' the lines on a person's palm could provide insights into their nature, but later discovered that the person's reaction to the reading had little to do with the actual lines on the palm. This fascination with why this happened led him to switch from a journalist degree to psychology.

JREF president D.J. Grothe asked Hyman "How does a young psychology student get into this parapsychology racket ... why you?" Hyman replied that it began when he was hired as a magician at age 7 (as the "Merry Mystic") performing for the Parents and Teachers Association at his school. This led him to read all about Harry Houdini and his work with spiritualists. By the age of 16 he started investigating spiritualist meetings. Thinking back to age 7, "I can't ever remember not being a skeptic".

Magicians who perform mentalism debate among themselves about using a disclaimer. The disclaimer is supposed to inform the audience that what they are witnessing is entertainment, and is not based on actual paranormal powers. In an interview with mentalist Mark Edward, Edward asked Hyman if he had ever used a disclaimer during the six years when he performed professionally as a mentalist. Hyman told him he did not remember explicitly using a disclaimer. He remembered always beginning the performance by stating that he did not claim any special powers. He was an entertainer and he hoped they would enjoy the show. After he became a psychologist, he realized that this was an example of the "invited inference." By openly stating that he made no claims about the nature of his ability, Hyman had given his audience no reason to challenge him. Indeed, he had invited the onlookers to make their own inferences about the source of the apparent feats of mind reading. Most of them concluded he was truly psychic.

He obtained a doctorate in psychology from Johns Hopkins University in 1953, and then taught at Harvard for five years. He also became an expert in statistical methods. In 2007 Hyman received an honorary doctorate from the Simon Fraser University for his "intellect and discipline who inspire others to follow in his footsteps... (and) for his courageous advocacy of unfettered skeptical inquiry". In 1982, Hyman held the "Spook Chair" for one year at Stanford University during a sabbatical from the University of Oregon. What the Stanford University psychologists informally call the "Spook" chair is officially known as The Thomas Welton Stanford Chair for Psychical Research. Thomas Welton was the brother of Stanford's founder, Leland Stanford.

Along with other notable skeptics like James Randi, Martin Gardner, Marcello Truzzi and Paul Kurtz, he was a founding member of the Committee for the Scientific Investigation of Claims of the Paranormal (CSICOP) (which is now known as the Committee for Skeptical Inquiry (CSI)), which publishes the Skeptical Inquirer. He also developed a style guide and etiquette manual to assist skeptical writers and critics. This is called "Hyman's Proper Criticism" and proposes six steps that skeptics can use to upgrade the quality of their criticism.

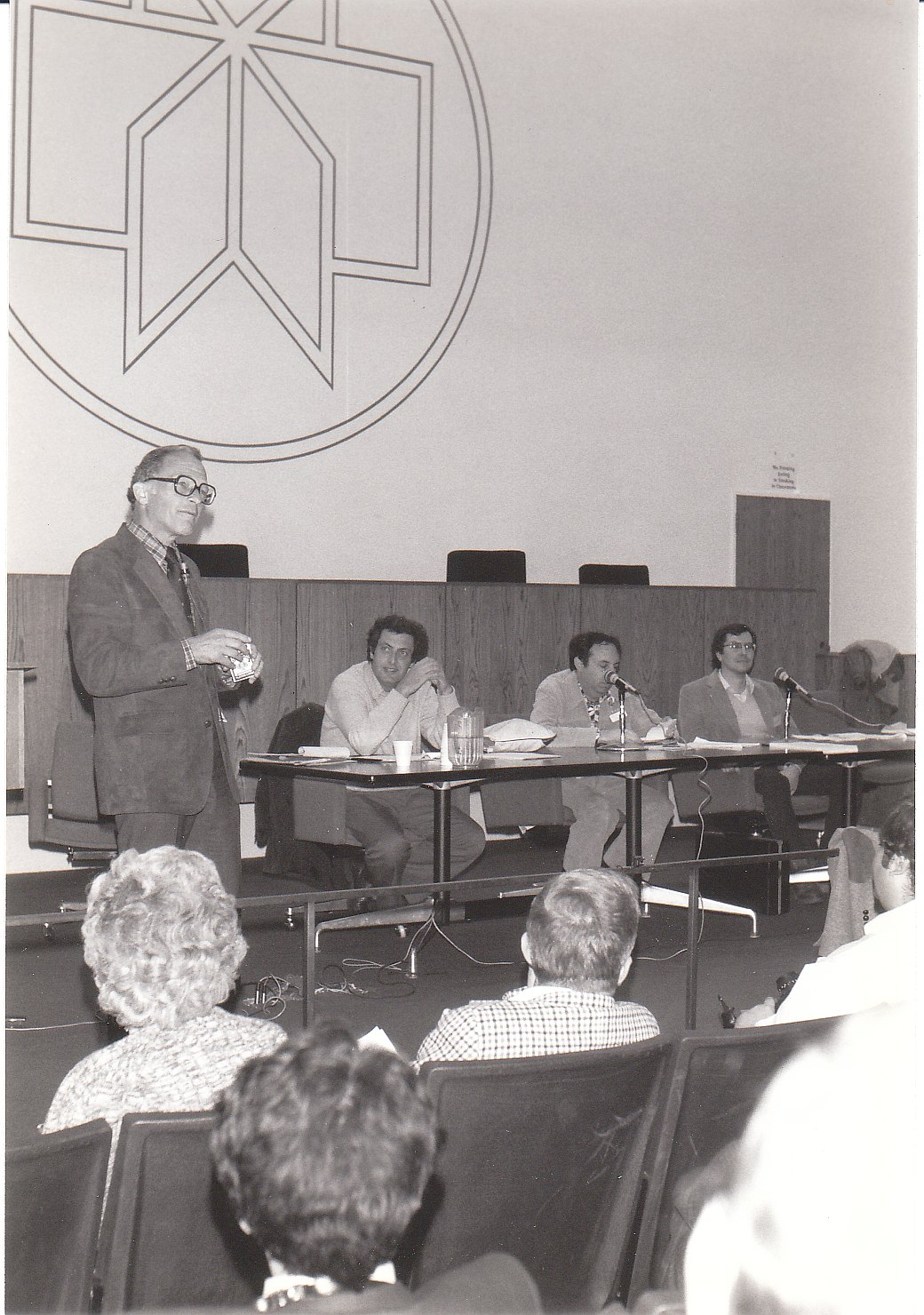
Hyman speaks at the 1983 CSICOP Conference in Buffalo, NY. With Lee Ross, Daryl Bem and Victor Benassi.

Aside from his scholarly publications and consultation with the U.S. Department of Defense in scrutinizing psychic research, one of his most popular articles is thirteen points to help you "amaze your friends with your new found psychic powers!", a guide to cold reading. According to Jim Alcock, "His article on cold reading, so Paul Kurtz informs me, has generated more requests for reprints than any other article in the history of the Skeptical Inquirer". The guide exploits what fascinated him in his academic research in cognitive psychology, that much deception is self-deception. He has investigated dowsing in the United States and written a book on the subject. He is one of the foremost skeptical experts on the Ganzfeld experiment. According to Bob Carroll, psychologist Ray Hyman is considered to be the foremost expert on subjective validation and cold reading.

Hyman's prestidigitational skills (which he calls "manipulating perception") have earned him the cover of The Linking Ring twice, June 1952 and October 1986 this magazine of the International Brotherhood of Magicians of which he has been a member for over 35 years.

Hyman retired in 1998 but continues to give talks and investigate paranormal claims. In July 2009 he appeared at The Amaz!ng Meeting 7 in Las Vegas, Nevada. Also in 2011, TAM 9 From Outer Space and TAM 2012. He is working on two books: How Smart People Go Wrong: Cognition and Human Error and Parapsychology's Achilles' Heel: Consistent Inconsistency.

On October 9, 2010, the Committee for Skeptical Inquiry announced Hyman (and others) as a part of their policy-making Executive Council, he will also serve on Skeptical Inquirer's magazine board.

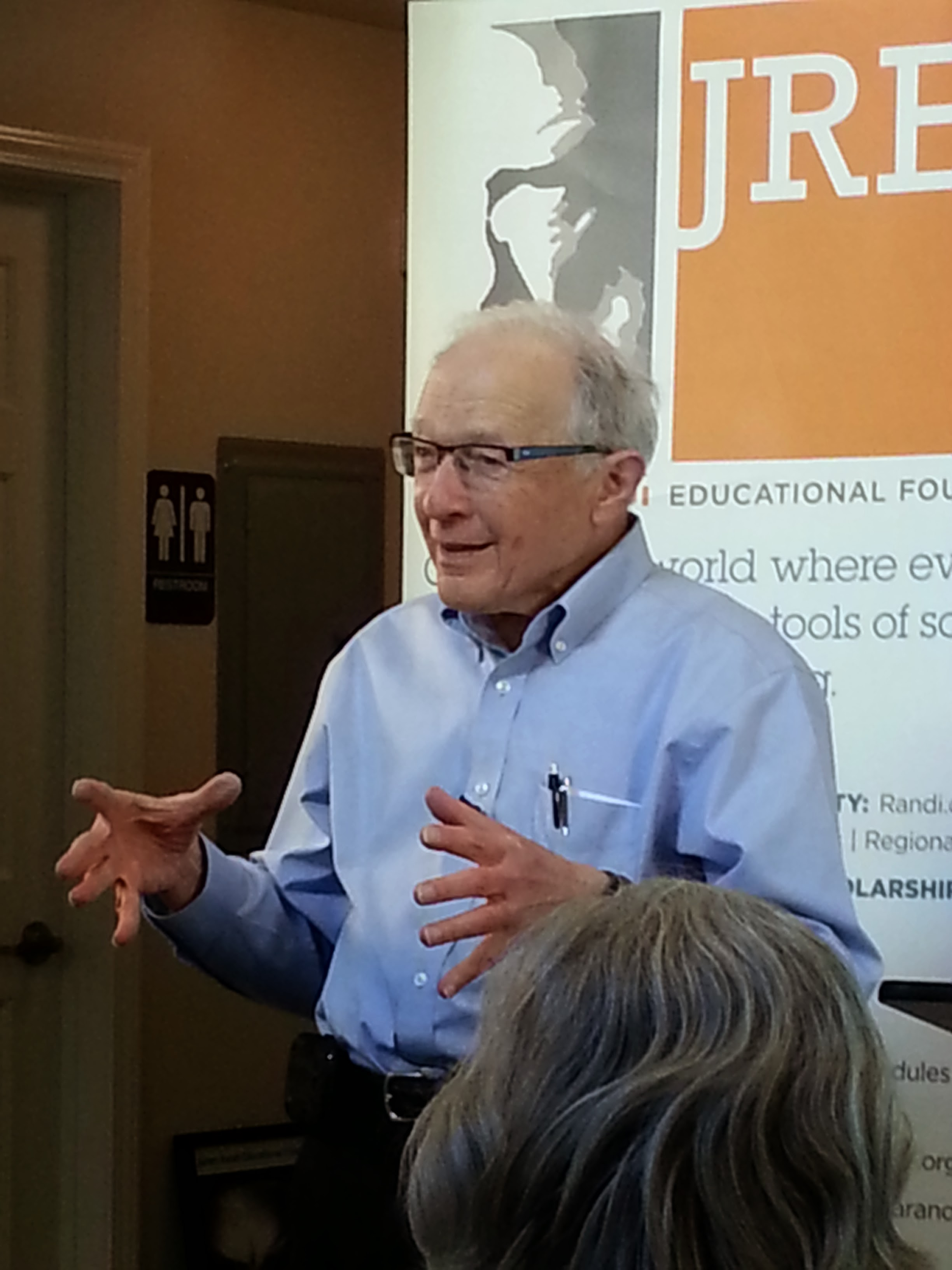
Ray Hyman speaking at the Los Angeles headquarters of the JREF in 2013

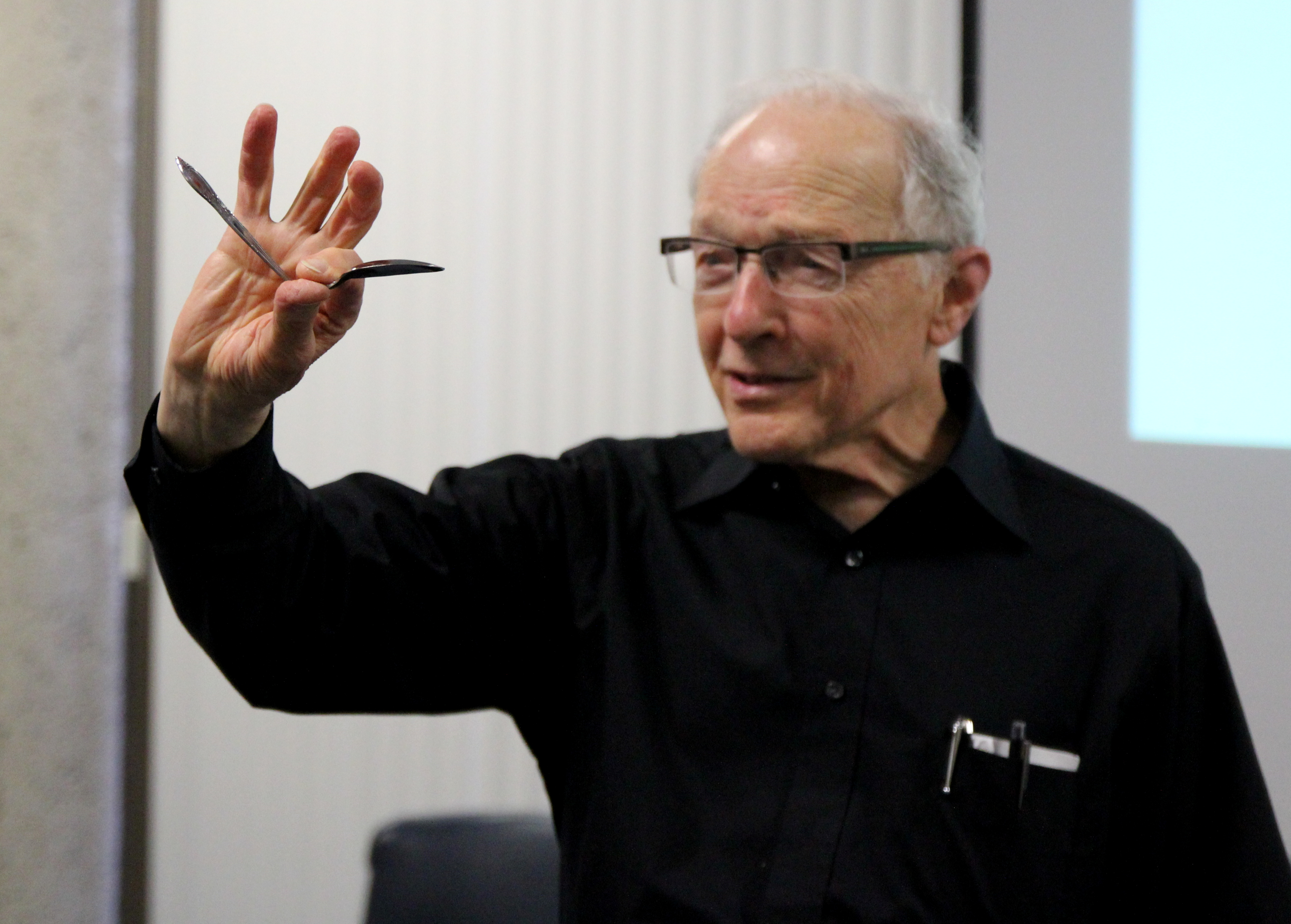
Ray Hyman demonstrates Uri Geller's spoon bending feats at CFI lecture. June 17, 2012 Costa Mesa, CA

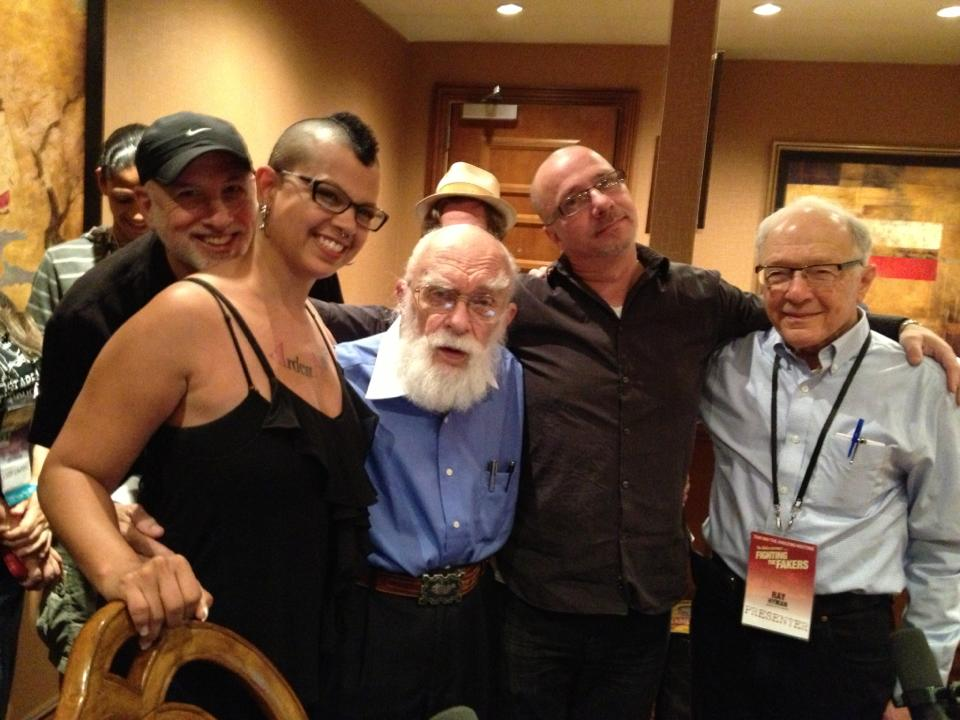
Participants in the "Skeptically Yours" podcast recorded at The Amazing Meeting for skeptics in 2013. Left to right: singer-songwriter Gary Stockdale, podcaster Heather Henderson, magician and meeting founder James Randi, comedian Emery Emery, and Hyman.

== History of skeptical movement ==
In the 2010 D.J. Grothe interview, Hyman states that the formation of the skeptic movement can be attributed to Uri Geller and Alice Cooper. Randi was touring with Cooper as a part of the stage show, Cooper asked Randi to invite Hyman to a show in order to ask his advice about the audience. While there, "Randi pulled me aside and said... we really ought to do something about this Uri Geller business... lets form an organization called SIR" (Sanity In Research). In 1972 joined by Martin Gardner they had their first meeting. The three of them felt they had no administration experience, "we just had good ideas" and were soon joined by Marcello Truzzi who provided structure for the group. Truzzi involved Paul Kurtz and they then formed CSICOP in 1976.

In an interview in 2009 with Derek Colanduno for the Skepticality podcast, Hyman was asked his opinion of the modern skeptical movement. Hyman responded that skeptics need to have goals and a way to measure them. They need to become a resource for the public, and focus on educating journalists and teachers. "That way we will get more bang for our buck." On the current state of the skeptical movement, Hyman stated "The media, unfortunately has made it so we have many more believers." Less science teachers in the classrooms, major newspapers are firing their science writing staff, 24-hour news channels are trying to fill all that time and compete with Fox News. "Things are not good."

== Skeptic's Toolbox ==
Hyman in 1989 created the Skeptic's Toolbox to teach people how to be better skeptics. Hyman tells James Underdown that "we were putting out more fires by skeptics than by believers... they were going overboard". The first toolbox was in Buffalo, NY with himself, James Alcock and Steve Shaw now called Banachek. With the exception of one year when the toolbox was held in Boulder, CO the toolbox has been held at the University of Oregon in Eugene. The Skeptic's Toolbox originally spanned 5 days. Later it was cut back to 4 days.

Speaking to a reporter from The Register-Guard, Hyman explains that people come from all over the country to attend the 4-day conference, to hone their critical thinking skills. Hyman is curious about why people who believe in paranormal claims without evidence continue to do so: "'I just want to understand how people get to believe some things... Magic is a perfect example of how people can be fooled'" and it works the same way with paranormal claims. Hyman felt that it was necessary to teach attendees with a "case-based approach... concrete examples as a first step toward extracting broad examples... (giving) the benefit of context" to the learning experience. This approach differs from that of a traditional conference: he has attendees use hands-on participation, splitting them into teams so they are able to spend quality time discussing the readings and lectures. At the 2014 Toolbox, Hyman used Oskar Pfungst’s investigation of Clever Hans as an example of how detailed and exhaustive some investigators are in studying claims.

== Hick-Hyman Law ==
Hyman published his "classic paper showing that human choice reaction time is related to the information content of an incoming signal" called the Hick-Hyman Law. This helped to lay the groundwork "for the shift from behavioral psychology... to the era of cognitive psychology." This was Hyman's second published paper, and submitted while still a grad student. He states that Hick used a different formula and got his "math wrong, which I corrected" but they still named the law after him because Hyman was "just a student". Sometimes called Hick's Law (mainly in Britain), in America it is more often referred to as the Hick-Hyman Law.

== Remote viewing review ==
Along with Jessica Utts, he conducted a review of CIA remote viewing experiments in 1995. He noted that the experiments "appear to be free of the more obvious and better known flaws that can invalidate the results of parapsychological investigations" and that there are significant effect sizes "too large and consistent to be dismissed as statistical flukes." However, he stops short of "concluding that the existence of anomalous cognition has been established."

== Ganzfeld experiments ==
While working at Stanford University and serving as the "Spook Chair'" Hyman decided that he would never be able to read all the literature concerning parapsychology that existed in the 1980s. He then asked parapsychologists "What is the best evidence for psi?" they nearly universally pointed to the Ganzfeld experiment. Hyman wrote to Charles Honorton and was sent 600 pages of information. Three years later Hyman's analysis led to the 1985 issue of the Journal of Parapsychology publishing Hyman's critiques. Hyman's conclusion "By themselves these experiments do not mean anything unless they can be replicated".

In 2007, Hyman noted that the ganzfeld experiments had not been successfully replicated and suggested there was evidence that sensory leakage had taken place in the autoganzfeld experiments.

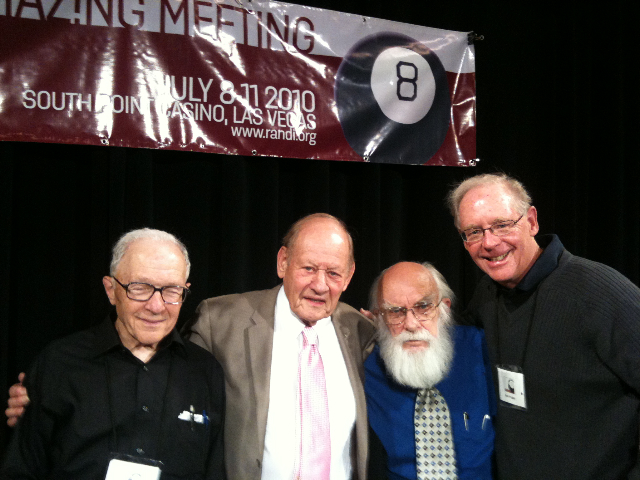
Ray Hyman, Paul Kurtz, James Randi, and Ken Frazier at TAM8, July 2010, Las Vegas, after their session on the history of the modern skeptical movement

== Uri Geller and Stanford Research Institute ==
Magician Jerry Andrus and Hyman appeared in 1975 on a TV station in Portland, Oregon, where they explained and duplicated the "paranormal" tricks Geller had performed for host Dick Klinger the week prior. Klinger asked, "Does Uri Geller have any supernatural powers?" Andrus gave the short answer "No." Hyman stated, "(Geller) is an opportunist... which is why it is difficult to duplicate him, he himself cannot duplicate himself. He's always ready to do something... he is going to do something when you think he is doing something else... misdirection... he's excellent at it, he's superb."

In 1972 Hyman was asked by DARPA to investigate psychic Uri Geller. Hyman was intrigued by a story that Geller had taken a ring from one of the scientists, set it on a table, and without touching it, the ring stood on end, broke in half and formed itself into a S-shape. Upon questioning all the scientists at the lab, Hyman discovered that no one had actually seen this happen, but had heard stories from others (who could not be tracked down) that it had happened." Hyman continued to question the scientists and discovered that no one had ever seen Geller bend anything without touching it. In fact "Geller was allowed to take the object into the bathroom... and then come back with the bent object, they took his word for it." "The parapsychologist (also sent to investigate) 'saw a psychic,' and I reported back that I saw only a charismatic fraud."

When asked to explain further why people believe in Geller when a magician can do the same thing without paranormal powers, Hyman states, "He's a fraud, but you can't blame people for believing him. Geller is a product of a wonderful public relations campaign... What the audience gets is only one side of the story... He has been caught cheating many times" but people still believe. Speaking as a psychologist Hyman says "If you get people in the right frame of mind and they are cooperating with you... and even give them a poor reading... they will fit it to themselves and believe you are telling them about their unique personality."

== Gary Schwartz ==
Gary Schwartz conducted numerous experiments at his laboratory at the University of Arizona where he is a tenured professor. Schwartz believes that he has proven the dead communicate with the living through human mediums. Hyman details many methodological errors with Schwartz's research including; "Inappropriate control comparisons", "Failure to use double-blind procedures", "Creating non-falsifiable outcomes by reinterpreting failures as successes" and "Failure to independently check on facts the sitters endorsed as true". Hyman wrote "Even if the research program were not compromised by these defects, the claims being made would require replication by independent investigators." Hyman criticizes Schwartz's decision to publish his results without gathering "evidence for their hypothesis that would meet generally accepted scientific criteria... they have lost credibility."

There have been many follow-up exchanges between Schwartz and Hyman over the Afterlife Experiments conducted by Schwartz. Published May 2003, Schwartz responded that Hyman ignored "the total body of research." Schwartz takes issue with Hyman's opinion that he (Hyman) will not believe in psi. Hyman answered, "Until multiple perfect experiments are performed and published... believe that the totality of the findings must be due to some combination of fraud, cold reading, rater bias, experimenter error, or chance... Why spend the time and money conducting multiple multi-center, double-blind experiments unless there are sufficient theoretical, experimental, and social reasons for doing so?"

== Proper Criticism ==
Hyman wrote a brief guide called "Proper Criticism", directed at critics of paranormal claims. It has widely been dispersed among Skeptics working in the public eye, including the editorial staff at Skeptical Inquirer. It is also featured in his book The Elusive Quarry.

Proper Criticism gives eight suggestions for approaching criticism thoughtfully in a way that is "both effective and responsible":

1. Be prepared: have responses prepared for commonly asked questions about skepticism.
2. Clarify your objectives: assess your own intentions and determine your intended audience. Hyman warns against criticism motivated by bad intentions, such as attacking the claimant instead of the claim.
3. Do your homework: research to understand the claimant's argument.
4. Do not go beyond your level of competence: admit what you do not know and consult experts when needed.
5. Let the facts speak for themselves: if you have thoroughly prepared, let the audience reach the conclusion on their own.
6. Be precise: use precise language, be as accurate as possible. While discussing "Proper Criticism" on the "Squaring the Strange" podcast, Benjamin Radford expanded on this advice: "often times ambiguous or fuzzy words or concepts reveal ambiguous or fuzzy thinking and obfuscation".
7. Use the principle of charity: give the claimant the benefit of the doubt. Also on "Squaring the Strange" podcast, Celestia Ward has called this the opposite of the straw man fallacy, advising critics formulate responses to the strongest interpretation of the claimant's argument.
8. Avoid loaded words and sensationalism: instead, choose long term credibility.

== Awards ==
- In Praise of Reason Award, the highest honor from the Committee for the Scientific Investigation of Claims of the Paranormal in 2003. The award is given in recognition of distinguished contributions in the use of critical inquiry, scientific evidence, and reason in evaluating claims to knowledge. Other recipients of this award include Carl Sagan, Kendrick Frazier, Murray Gell-Mann, Stephen Jay Gould, Martin Gardner, and Nobel laureate physicist Leon Lederman.
- Co-recipient of the 2005 Robert P. Balles Prize in Critical Thinking, awarded by CSICOP. The award is rewarded to the author of "The published work that best exemplifies healthy skepticism, logical analysis or empirical science". The 2005 award was shared with authors Andrew Skolnick and Joe Nickell. Hyman received award for his article Testing Natasha published in the series Testing the Girl with the X-Ray Eyes in Skeptical Inquirer.
- Doctor of Science, Honoris Causa from Simon Fraser University in October 2007.
- Philip J. Klass Award for outstanding contributions in promoting critical thinking and scientific understanding for 2010, awarded by National Capital Area Skeptics (NCAS).

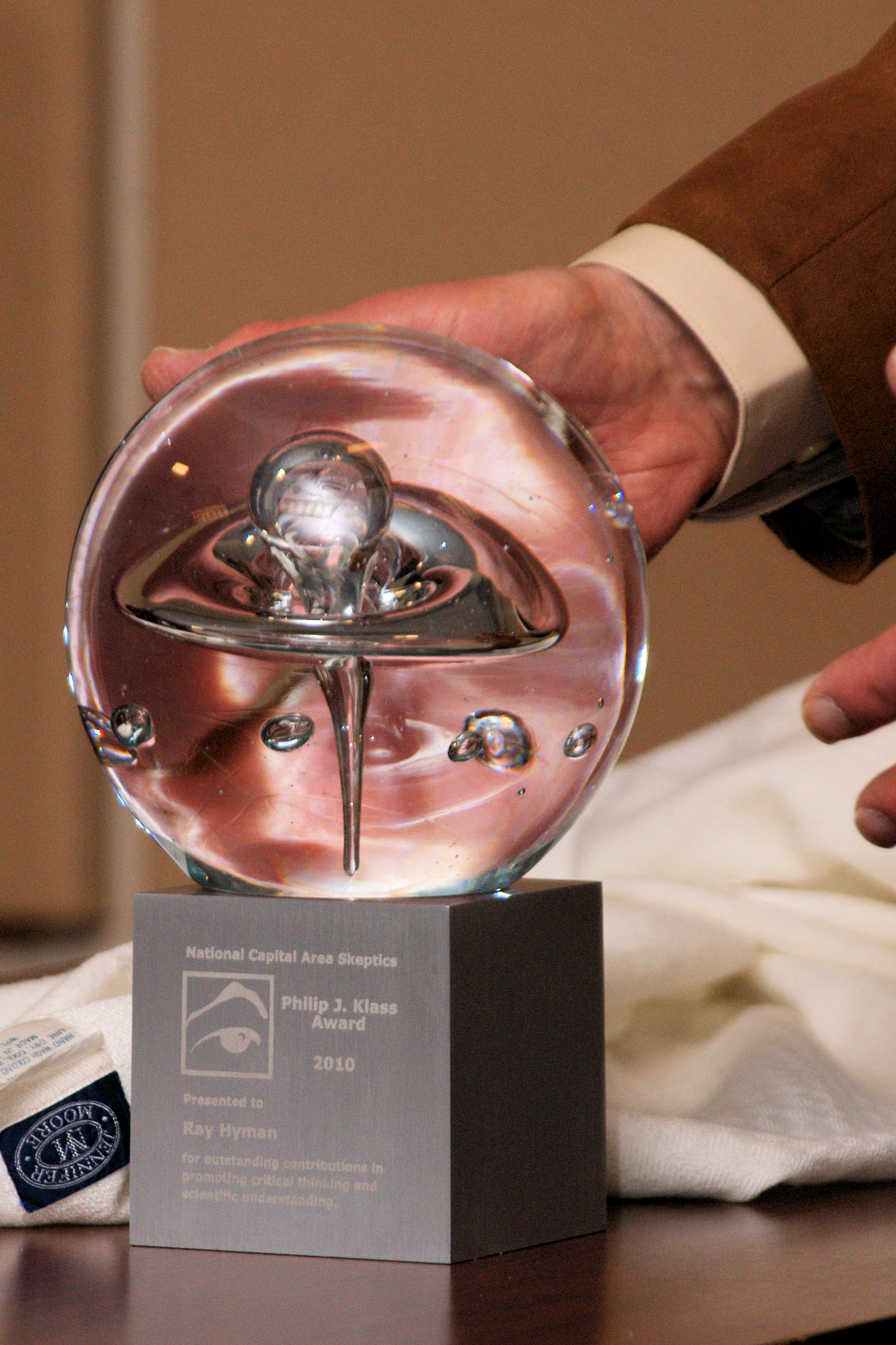
Accepting the NCAS Philip Klass Award

- The Independent Investigation Group presented Hyman with the Houdini Hall of Honor award 2011.

== Books ==
- Bush, Robert R.; Abelson, Robert; Hyman, Ray (1956), Mathematics for Psychologists, New York: Social Science Research Council, OCLC 2301803
- Vogt, Evon Zartman; Hyman, Ray (1959), Water Witching USA, Chicago: University of Chicago Press, OCLC 315006378
- Hyman, Ray (1964), The Nature of Psychological Inquiry, Englewood Cliffs, NJ: Prentice-Hall, OCLC 191376
- Hyman, Ray (1989), The Elusive Quarry: A Scientific Appraisal of Psychical Research, Amherst, NY: Prometheus Books, ISBN 0879755040, OCLC 19455101
- Andrus, Jerry; Hyman, Ray (2000), Andrus Card Control, Eugene, OR: Chazpro Magic, OCLC 65215589

== Selected articles ==
- How People Are Fooled by Ideomotor Action – Quackwatch.org
- Proper Criticism – July/August 2001 – Skeptical Inquirer Magazine
