= Long Island Medium =

American television series (2011–2019)

- Genre: Reality television
- Starring: Theresa Caputo; Larry Caputo Jr. Victoria Caputo
- Country of origin: United States
- Original language: English
- No. of seasons: 14
- No. of episodes: 176

Production
- Running time: 22 to 42 minutes
- Production company: Magilla Entertainment

Original release
- Network: TLC
- Release: September 25, 2011 – December 13, 2019

Long Island Medium is an American reality television series starring Theresa Caputo, a self-professed medium who claims she can communicate with the dead. Much of the program, which premiered on September 25, 2011, takes place in Hicksville, New York, though it often follows Caputo as she meets with clients in other areas.

Scientific skeptics say mediumship performances are a con, and Caputo's specific claims have been deemed fictitious by critics, including magician James Randi, Inside Edition, and Jezebel.

== Synopsis ==
Each episode focuses on Caputo as she conducts private and group readings with both believers and skeptics. Her husband Larry and two children, Victoria and Larry Jr., have learned to live with her mediumship. In a 2011 interview, Caputo claimed she could communicate with dead people: "Things are just there. When I was younger I used to actually see images and hear things. As I got older and shut down, it has changed. Because it was frightening to see people standing there who actually weren't there."

== Reception ==
Scientific skeptics say mediumship performances are a con, and that Caputo's seemingly paranormal performances are simply the result of well-known exploits like the Forer effect, cold reading, selective editing of the show, and her subjects' eagerness to believe.

In 2012, the James Randi Educational Foundation (JREF) awarded Caputo its Pigasus Award for being, in its view, the "psychic" performer who fooled the greatest number of people with the least effort in the preceding year. A Pigasus award was also given to TLC for continuing to air the show. In an article published by Wired Magazine the organization's founder James Randi explained why he believed shows like Long Island Medium were deceptive and potentially harmful to its participants:

Why do these pseudo-psychic spectacles bother those of us at the James Randi Educational Foundation? First, and foremost: They are not true. [...] But much more importantly to us, such performances seem to prey on people at their most vulnerable moments — those who have suffered the loss of loved ones — and these mediums use such grief to make a buck. Psychologists tell us this keeps the grieving stuck in their grief, rather than going through the natural stages of acceptance that are healthy.

In June of that year, Caputo appeared in a commercial for Priceline.com in which she portrayed herself "connecting" with the late Priceline Negotiator character previously played by William Shatner. JREF President DJ Grothe issued a statement asking Priceline.com to prove that Caputo has the abilities that she claims to possess.

Inside Edition examined Caputo's claims of being able to talk to the dead and found them lacking as she performed live, saying they "watched her strike out time and again." Mark Edward, who used to portray himself as a medium, gave his opinion that Caputo does not have supernatural powers and explained several common techniques she could be using to pretend to have such abilities. She responded in a statement: "I respect and understand skeptics. I'm not trying to prove anything to anyone, that's not why I do what I do. I feel, and have been told by my clients, that my gift has really helped them, and that's all that matters to me."

Ron Tebo, proprietor of the YouTube debunking channel SciFake, has argued that Caputo engages in several forms of deception, including sending staff members to interview audience members in advance to acquire knowledge to claim communication with the dead.

In March 2018, skeptical activist Susan Gerbic published an article in Skeptical Inquirer summarizing several techniques that she says are used by psychics such as Caputo to achieve their effects.

While noting that Caputo's claim of special powers "has been questioned", Variety's Gregg Goldstein described her in generally positive terms in a 2012 article, writing, "In an era of hit reality shows about families and denizens of New Jersey, the series' equally big selling point is the dynamic with her husband and two wisecracking teenagers, making it play like a combination of Real Housewives of New Jersey and Bewitched – particularly when their frustrations surface over her random communications with what she calls 'Spirit.'"

In a 2019 segment of Last Week Tonight, which featured Caputo as well as other prominent TV psychics, John Oliver criticized the media for producing shows such as this because they convince viewers that psychic powers are real, and so enable neighborhood psychics to prey on grieving families. Oliver said, "...when psychic abilities are presented as authentic, it emboldens a vast underworld of unscrupulous vultures, more than happy to make money by offering an open line to the afterlife, as well as many other bullshit services."

== Cast ==
Main

- Theresa Caputo

Recurring

- Larry Caputo Jr.
- Victoria Caputo
- Larry Caputo

== Episodes ==
=== Series overview ===
Season	Episodes	Originally released	
Season	Episodes	First released	Last released
1	9	September 25, 2011	November 6, 2011
2	14	March 25, 2012	May 6, 2012
3	17	September 9, 2012	November 4, 2012
4	15	May 12, 2013	June 30, 2013
5	16	October 6, 2013	December 22, 2013
6	18	March 9, 2014	May 18, 2014
7	15	August 3, 2014	October 12, 2014
8	15	March 8, 2015	May 3, 2015
9	15	December 1, 2015	March 27, 2016
10	10	February 19, 2017	April 23, 2017
11	5	November 6, 2017	December 4, 2017
12	6	April 8, 2018	May 6, 2018
13	8	October 8, 2018	November 26, 2018
14	9	October 18, 2019	December 13, 2019

=== Season 1 (2011) ===
No. overall	No. in season	Title	Original release date	U.S. viewers (millions)
1	1	"No Turning Off"	September 25, 2011	1.36
2	2	"Driving Me Nuts"	September 25, 2011	1.07
3	3	"Spirit Release"	October 2, 2011	1.41
4	4	"This Isn't Working"	October 2, 2011	1.31
5	5	"Theresa's Upgrade"	October 9, 2011	1.36
6	6	"Reconnecting"	October 16, 2011	1.45
7	7	"Blessing & A Curse"	October 23, 2011	1.44
8	8	"Theresa Explains It All"	October 30, 2011	1.38
9	9	"Sailing With Spirits"	November 6, 2011	1.28

=== Season 2 (2012) ===
No. overall	No. in season	Title	Original release date	U.S. viewers (millions)
10	1	"Meeting the Parents"	March 25, 2012	2.28
11	2	"Drumming and Healing"	March 25, 2012	2.25
12	3	"Losing It"	April 1, 2012	1.69
13	4	"Poor Petey"	April 1, 2012	1.61
14	5	"Christmas Spirit"	April 8, 2012	1.48
15	6	"Spirit Al Dente"	April 8, 2012	1.91
16	7	"Car Crazy"	April 15, 2012	1.75
17	8	"Just Like Me"	April 15, 2012	1.91
18	9	"Wheelin' & Dealin'"	April 22, 2012	2.02
19	10	"Long Island Romance"	April 22, 2012	2.29
20	11	"Bellies & Babies"	April 29, 2012	1.84
21	12	"Apply Yourself"	April 29, 2012	2.11
22	13	"Uneasy"	May 6, 2012	1.99
23	14	"Spirit and the City"	May 6, 2012	2.24

=== Season 3 (2012) ===
No. overall	No. in season	Title	Original release date	U.S. viewers (millions)
24	1	"Homecoming"	September 9, 2012	3.17
25	2	"A Medium Surprise"	September 9, 2012	3.52
26	3	"Help Me"	September 16, 2012	2.62
27	4	"The Princess and Her Prom"	September 16, 2012	3.12
28	5	"The Flying Larrys"	September 23, 2012	2.68
29	6	"My Keys Now"	September 23, 2012	2.82
30	7	"Beach Bonding"	September 30, 2012	2.53
31	8	"The Graduate"	September 30, 2012	2.84
32	9	"On the Road"	October 7, 2012	2.74
33	10	"The Family Photo"	October 14, 2012	2.96
34	11	"Joe Skeptic"	October 14, 2012	3.08
35	12	"FAQ"	October 21, 2012	2.64
36	13	"Never Before Seen"	October 21, 2012	2.93
37	14	"Theresa and the Tent"	October 28, 2012	2.74
38	15	"Like Father, Not Like Daughter"	October 28, 2012	2.95
39	16	"Halloween Spirit"	November 4, 2012	3.09
40	17	"Hello College"	November 4, 2012	3.22

=== Season 4 (2013) ===
No. overall	No. in season	Title	Original release date	U.S. viewers (millions)
41	1	"Missing My Princess"	May 12, 2013	2.34
42	2	"Theresa in Training"	May 12, 2013	2.51
43	3	"The Royal Flush"	May 19, 2013	2.11
44	4	"Sandy Spirit"	May 19, 2013	2.12
45	5	"The Gambler"	May 26, 2013	1.93
46	6	"Why Me"	May 26, 2013	2.20
47	7	"Louie's Lost"	June 2, 2013	2.11
48	8	"The Medium Matchmaker"	June 2, 2013	2.25
49	9	"Girls Night In"	June 9, 2013	2.01
50	10	"Spirit on the Slopes"	June 9, 2013	2.12
51	11	"Bouffants and Bingo"	June 16, 2013	1.82
52	12	"The Pincushion"	June 16, 2013	1.80
53	13	"Once Upon a Dream"	June 23, 2013	1.89
54	14	"The Patient"	June 23, 2013	1.93
55	15	"Unseen"	June 30, 2013	1.99

=== Season 5 (2013) ===
No. overall	No. in season	Title	Original release date	U.S. viewers (millions)
56	1	"On the Road: Philadelphia"	October 6, 2013	2.62
57	2	"Construction Zone"	October 13, 2013	1.66
58	3	"Shoo Shoo Spirit"	October 13, 2013	1.97
59	4	"Spirit Left Behind"	October 20, 2013	1.85
60	5	"Gluten Free V"	October 20, 2013	1.88
61	6	"Momma's Boy"	October 27, 2013	1.91
62	7	"Diving Right In"	October 27, 2013	1.88
63	8	"When There's a Will..."	November 3, 2013	1.99
64	9	"Just Me and V in the Catskills"	November 3, 2013	2.02
65	10	"Bunny Love"	November 10, 2013	1.68
66	11	"Ready To Leave"	November 10, 2013	1.72
67	12	"Long Island Medium Revisited"	November 17, 2013	1.77
68	13	"Back to Normal"	November 24, 2013	2.11
69	14	"On the Road: Niagara"	December 1, 2013	2.11
70	15	"Christmas at the Caputo's"	December 15, 2013	1.94
71	16	"Unseen 2"	December 22, 2013	N/A

=== Season 6 (2014) ===
No. overall	No. in season	Title	Original release date	U.S. viewers (millions)
72	1	"On the Road: San Francisco"	March 9, 2014	1.87
73	2	"This Nest Ain't Empty Yet"	March 16, 2014	1.99
74	3	"A Change Is A-Comin"	March 16, 2014	2.04
75	4	"Surprise Visit"	March 23, 2014	1.63
76	5	"The Juice is Loose"	March 23, 2014	1.79
77	6	"Back to School"	March 30, 2014	1.59
78	7	"Medium Love"	March 30, 2014	1.74
79	8	"Theresa Visits Jail"	April 6, 2014	1.90
80	9	"Chinese New Year"	April 6, 2014	1.98
81	10	"It Ain't Easy Being Me"	April 13, 2014	1.76
82	11	"Out of the Attic"	April 13, 2014	1.94
83	12	"A Portrait"	April 20, 2014	1.84
84	13	"Sage is the Rage"	April 20, 2014	1.80
85	14	"Ashes to Art"	April 27, 2014	1.80
86	15	"Prayers for Petey"	April 27, 2014	1.84
87	16	"The Show Must Go On"	May 4, 2014	1.84
88	17	"Behind the Read IV"	May 11, 2014	N/A
89	18	"On the Road: New Orleans"	May 18, 2014	1.86

=== Season 7 (2014) ===
No. overall	No. in season	Title	Original release date	U.S. viewers (millions)
90	1	"On The Road: Las Vegas Part I"	August 3, 2014	1.48
91	2	"On The Road: Las Vegas Part II"	August 10, 2014	1.40
92	3	"In the Out Door"	August 17, 2014	1.59
93	4	"Helmet Head"	August 17, 2014	1.60
94	5	"Put a Ring on It"	August 24, 2014	N/A
95	6	"New Dog, Old Tricks"	August 24, 2014	N/A
96	7	"Ugly Truckling"	August 31, 2014	N/A
97	8	"Caputo Luau"	September 7, 2014	N/A
98	9	"Horsing Around"	September 7, 2014	N/A
99	10	"Family Fundraiser"	September 14, 2014	N/A
100	11	"Never Before Seen"	September 21, 2014	N/A
101	12	"Put Up Your Dukes"	September 21, 2014	N/A
102	13	"Gone Fishing"	September 28, 2014	N/A
103	14	"Behind the Read V"	October 5, 2014	N/A
104	15	"On the Road: DC"	October 12, 2014	N/A

=== Season 8 (2015) ===
No. overall	No. in season	Title	Original release date	U.S. viewers (millions)
105	1	"25 and Counting"	March 8, 2015	N/A
106	2	"Dog Eat Dog Summer"	March 15, 2015	N/A
107	3	"Back to My Roots"	March 15, 2015	N/A
108	4	"Getting the Band Back Together"	March 22, 2015	N/A
109	5	"Don't Give Up Your Day Job"	March 22, 2015	N/A
110	6	"On the Road: Texas"	March 29, 2015	N/A
111	7	"Coach Theresa"	April 5, 2015	N/A
112	8	"Spirit Roll"	April 5, 2015	N/A
113	9	"Return to Jail"	April 12, 2015	N/A
114	10	"Roller Rink Romance"	April 12, 2015	N/A
115	11	"When a Bedroom Door Closes, a Closet Door Opens"	April 19, 2015	N/A
116	12	"Behind the Scenes of Knock & Shock"	April 19, 2015	N/A
117	13	"Never Before Seen"	April 26, 2015	N/A
118	14	"Theresa Loves Moms"	May 3, 2015	N/A

=== Season 9 (2015–16) ===
No. overall	No. in season	Title	Original release date	U.S. viewers (millions)
119	1	"Caputo Christmas"	December 1, 2015	N/A
120	2	"Celebrity Spirit"	January 3, 2016	N/A
121	3	"Spirit in Paradise: Snowbirds"	January 10, 2016	N/A
122	4	"Spirit in Paradise: The Son Also Visits"	January 10, 2016	N/A
123	5	"Spirit in Paradise: The Decision"	January 17, 2016	N/A
124	6	"Before The Baby"	January 17, 2016	N/A
125	7	"Line of Duty"	January 24, 2016	N/A
126	8	"I Don't Believe"	January 31, 2016	N/A
127	9	"Haunted Houses"	January 31, 2016	N/A
128	10	"Chanelling Love"	February 14, 2016	N/A
129	11	"Wisdom Teeth"	February 14, 2016	N/A
130	12	"Remembering Petey"	February 14, 2016	N/A
131	13	"Theresa Reads Kids"	February 21, 2016	N/A
132	14	"Parental Blessing"	February 21, 2016	N/A
133	15	"Surprise In Disguise"	March 13, 2016	N/A
134	16	"Before the Wedding"	March 13, 2016	N/A
135	17	"Before the Baby"	March 13, 2016	N/A
136	18	"Was It My Fault?"	March 20, 2016	N/A
137	19	"Healing the Anger"	March 20, 2016	N/A
138	20	"Block Party!"	March 27, 2016	N/A

=== Season 10 (2017) ===
No. overall	No. in season	Title	Original release date	U.S. viewers (millions)
139	1	"Star Studded Spirit"	February 19, 2017	N/A
140	2	"I Now Pronounce You."	February 26, 2017	N/A
141	3	"There's A Lamp"	March 5, 2017	N/A
142	4	"The Biopsy is Back"	March 12, 2017	N/A
143	5	"An MRI For Larry"	March 19, 2017	N/A
144	6	"Beauty School Drop-In"	March 26, 2017	N/A
145	7	"Victoria's Test"	April 2, 2017	N/A
146	8	"Is the Gift Real?"	April 9, 2017	N/A
147	9	"Panic Attack"	April 16, 2017	N/A
148	10	"The Spirits of Hollywood"	April 23, 2017	N/A

=== Season 11 (2017) ===
No. overall	No. in season	Title	Original release date	U.S. viewers (millions)
149	1	"Reading the Stars"	November 6, 2017	N/A
Reading for celebrities, Kelsey Grammer, Bob Harper, Mark McGrath, Chrissy Metz
150	2	"50 is the New 35"	November 13, 2017	N/A
151	3	"Freezing Theresa"	November 20, 2017	N/A
Shark Tank Barbara Corcoran gets a reading. Meanwhile at a fundraiser, Theresa channels an accident victim for the distraught police officer who couldn't save him, and reads a man while she is inside the cryogenic freezing chamber
152	4	"Theresa Crashes Victoria's Date"	November 27, 2017	N/A
153	5	"Southern Fried Spirit"	December 4, 2017	N/A

=== Season 12 (2018) ===
No. overall	No. in season	Title	Original release date	U.S. viewers (millions)
154	1	"The Breaking Point"	April 8, 2018	N/A
155	2	"A Big Decision"	April 15, 2018	N/A
156	3	"Knock, Knock, It's Theresa!"	April 15, 2018	N/A
157	4	"Theresa on Tour"	April 22, 2018	N/A
158	5	"Living Apart"	April 29, 2018	N/A
159	6	"Star-Crossed Spirits"	May 6, 2018	N/A

=== Season 13 (2018) ===
No. overall	No. in season	Title	Original release date	U.S. viewers (millions)
160	1	"A Year of Separation"	October 8, 2018	N/A
161	2	"Readings and Renovations"	October 15, 2018	N/A
162	3	"An Accident On Tour"	October 22, 2018	N/A
163	4	"Weight-shaming Victoria"	October 29, 2018	N/A
164	5	"The Reunion"	November 5, 2018	N/A
165	6	"Sitcom Spirits"	November 12, 2018	N/A
166	7	"Guess Who?"	November 19, 2018	N/A
167	8	"Five Star Readings"	November 26, 2018	N/A

=== Season 14 (2019) ===
No. overall	No. in season	Title	Original release date	U.S. viewers (millions)
168	1	"A Spirit Returns"	October 18, 2019	N/A
169	2	"A Lifetime of Loss"	October 25, 2019	N/A
170	3	"24 Hours With Theresa"	November 1, 2019	N/A
171	4	"Larry Returns"	November 8, 2019	N/A
172	5	"Keeping the Faith"	November 15, 2019	N/A
173	6	"Clearing the List"	November 22, 2019	N/A
174	7	"I Did Not See This Coming"	November 29, 2019	N/A
175	8	"Stars and Spirits"	December 6, 2019	N/A
176	9	"Will Victoria Say Yes?"	December 13, 2019	N/A

== See also ==
- Ann O'Delia Diss Debar
- Char Margolis
- James Van Praagh
- John Edward
- Linda and Terry Jamison
- Matt Fraser (psychic)
- Monica the Medium
- Peter Popoff
- Rose Mackenberg
- Thomas John Flanagan
- Tyler Henry
