= Uneasy =

Uneasy may refer to:

- "Uneasy", episode of Long Island Medium
- "Uneasy", a single by Laika (band)
- "Uneasy", a song by Rita Ora from Ora
- "Uneasy", a 2021 album by Vijay Iyer, Linda May Han Oh and Tyshawn Sorey
