= The SemWare Editor =

Text editing software

The Semware Editor (TSE)
- Original author: Sammy Mitchell
- Developer: The SemWare Corporation
- Initial release: 1985; 41 years ago
- Stable release: 4.49 / January 2023
- Operating system: Windows, Linux, MS-DOS, OS/2
- Platform: x86
- Available in: C
- Type: Text editor
- License: 2021: BSD-2-Clause; 1985: Proprietary
- Website: www.semware.com

The SemWare Editor (TSE) is a text editor product line. Initially named QEdit and released November 1985 as shareware, it was later modified to run as a terminate-and-stay-resident (TSR) program, and ported to OS/2 and eventually evolved (via rewrite) to TSEPro (professional edition).

TSEPro supports many productivity features including an automation macro language, regular expression search and replace, keystroke record and playback, undo and redo, and user-assignable shortcut keys. Like its predecessor QEdit, TSEPro is often used as a code editor.

Older versions (QEdit) supported MS-DOS and OS/2, and newer versions (TSEPro) support Windows and Linux.

== QEdit ==
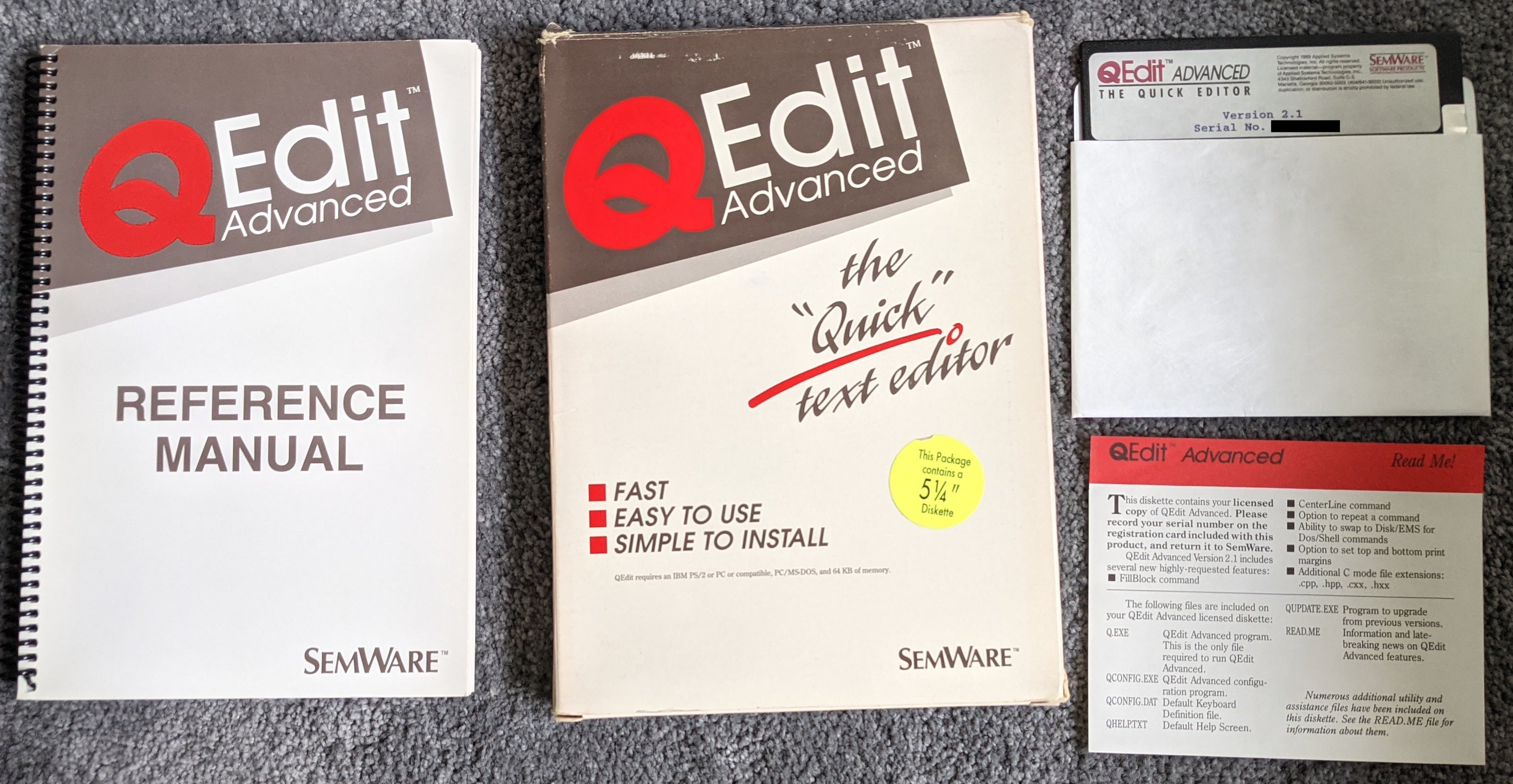
Manual, box and disk (circa 1990)

Initially, QEdit ran only on MS-DOS. As memory of contemporary computers was limited, less memory use was desirable. QEdit used only 50 KB whereas some contemporary editors used 10 times as much. Early versions maintained file content in conventional memory, but to support larger files, later versions supported various DOS memory management features including expanded memory (EMS), extended memory (XMS) and virtual memory, up to a maximum of 16 MB.

QEdit was ported to OS/2 as a 16-bit application for OS/2 1.x. Version 1.50 is dated February 1990.

SemWare ported QEdit for 32-bit OS/2 with the release of QEdit Pro 3.0 for OS/2 in February 1994 which sold for $99. Version 3.0 includes multi-file operation, HPFS support and access to the OS/2 Clipboard. SemWare claimed over 120,000 licensed users on all platforms at that time.

The last versions were released as The SemWare Editor Junior edition. The last version was released in February 1997 for OS/2 with the name "TSE Junior/2". It is functionally equivalent to TSE Junior v4.00e with support for OS/2's system-wide clipboard and long filenames. It retailed at the time for $99 and was supplied with a copy of the MS-DOS basic version.

== TSEPro ==
QEdit was rewritten and significantly expanded, and eventually released as The SemWare Editor Professional (TSEPro) edition which includes a macro programming language, syntax highlighting, and large file support. The initial release maintained the tradition of fast I/O and response, fast search, a simple text scripting language and the fundamental design of a native core with functionality split between native code and scripting. New features included regular expression search and replace and a more powerful scripting language (with access to DLL entry points).

Earlier versions operated in the console window in text-only mode with limited character sets and colors. Version 2.6 was a native Win32 port, but was still character-based (using the Win32 Console APIs). Version 4.0 included the Win32 application rewritten as a pixel-based graphical application (g32.exe) using Graphics Device Interface (GDI). This is commonly misunderstood to be a console application, as it still appears textual despite being a Win32 graphical application. Visually, g32 appears to work in lines and columns, though it is a graphical application (via WinMain and GDI, not the Console API).

== SemWare Application Language ==
The macro programming language, SemWare Application Language (SAL), uses a Pascal-like notation supporting procedural functions and procedures, local and global variables, constants, a preprocessor including common #include and #ifdef keywords, iterative and recursive control structures, and many text-editing-specific functions. SAL supports two data types: an integer is a 32-bit, base-2, signed, integral number, and a string is a fixed-size array of characters, with a maximum definable length of 255 characters. SAL supports the creation and use of text buffers, including non-interactive buffers, which are not visible to the user.

For example:

proc Main()
    integer i
    for i = 1 to 3
        Warn("Hello world ", i)
    endfor
end

== Timeline ==
Month	Year	Name	Version	Description
May	1985	QEdit	–	First beta version
Nov	1985	QEdit	1.0	First official release – Written in Turbo Pascal
Feb	1986	QEdit	1.2	Multiple windows
Mar	1986	QEdit	1.25	–
May	1986	QEdit	1.25A	–
Jul	1986	QEdit	1.30	–
Apr	1987	QEdit	1.35	–
Jun	1987	QEdit	1.36	–
Jul	1987	QEdit	1.37	–
Oct	1987	QEdit	1.38	Size decreased to 29 KB
Feb	1988	QEdit	1.39	–
Feb	1988	QEdit	2.00	Pulldown menus added
Mar	1988	QEdit	2.03	Converted to Turbo Pascal 4.0
Apr	1988	QEdit	2.05	–
Dec	1988	QEdit	2.07	Added Column blocks
Feb	1989	QEdit	2.07A	–
Jul	1989	QEdit	2.08	–
Feb	1990	QEdit	2.1	Converted to C / First release of TSR version / First release of QEdit for OS/2 / First German translation
Mar	1991	–	–	First TSEPro beta / Includes first version of SAL, Virtual memory support, multifile, block support.
Aug	1991	QEdit	2.15	–
–	1992	–	–	Product line split into TSE Jr. (formerly QEdit) and TSE Pro
Mar	1993	TSEPro	1.0	First release, Virtual memory, macro language
Feb	1994	QEdit	3.0	Last product named QEdit / HPFS support in OS/2 version
Sep	1994	TSEPro	2.0	Help system, history
Mar	1995	TSEJr	4.0	QEdit renamed to TSEJr
Sep	1995	TSEPro	2.5	Multifile find, save state, last DOS version
Oct	1996	TSEPro	2.6	First Win32 version – Console only
Feb	1997	TSE JR/2	4.0	first OS/2 version of TSEJr; console only
Mar	1997	–	–	First experimental Windows GUI version
Jun	1997	TSEPro	2.8	Color syntax highlighting
Dec	1998	–	–	Experimental Windows GUI version killed
Apr	2001	TSEPro	3.0	Undo/redo
May	2002	TSEPro	4.0	First GUI version
Feb	2004	TSEPro	4.2	–
Oct	2004	–	–	First beta for Linux
May	2005	TSEPro	4.4	–
Jan	2022	TSEPro	4.42	For Windows and Linux

== See also ==
- Comparison of text editors
- Tim Farley
