= Susan Gerbic =

American skepticism activist (born 1962)

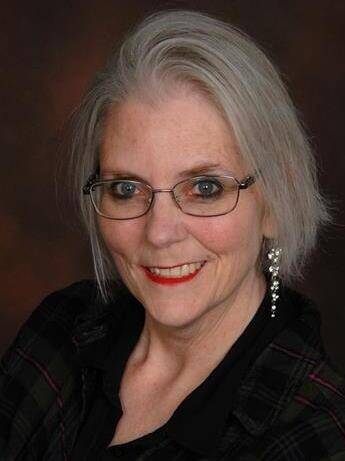
- Gerbic in August 2016
- Born: 1962 (age 63–64); Salinas, California, U.S.
- Education: California State University, Monterey Bay (BA)
- Occupation: Studio photographer
- Employer: Lifetouch Portrait Studios (1982–2016)
- Known for: Scientific skepticism
- Susan Gerbic's voice Recorded in May 2015
- Website: abouttimeproject.wordpress.com

Susan Gerbic (born 1962) is an American studio photographer who became known as a scientific skepticism activist, mostly for exposing people claiming to be mediums. A columnist for Skeptical Inquirer, she is the co-founder of Monterey County Skeptics and a fellow of the Committee for Skeptical Inquiry.

== Life and career ==
The youngest of three children, Gerbic was raised as a Southern Baptist in Salinas, California. Her father was born in Euclid, Ohio, to parents from Slovenia; he served during World War II and after the war went to live in Salinas. Gerbic attended Fremont Elementary, El Sausal Junior High School, and Alisal High School in Salinas, graduating in 1980. She became an atheist in her junior year. After high school, she studied at Hartnell College, also in Salinas, obtaining AAs in general studies in 1993 and history in 1998, while working and raising two sons. In 2002, she was awarded a BA in Social & Behavioral Studies by California State University, Monterey Bay.

Gerbic worked at Lifetouch, a portrait studio in JC Penney in the Northridge Mall in Salinas, from 1982 for 34 years, including as manager. She retired in 2016 when the studio closed.

== Activism ==
=== Guerrilla Skeptics ===
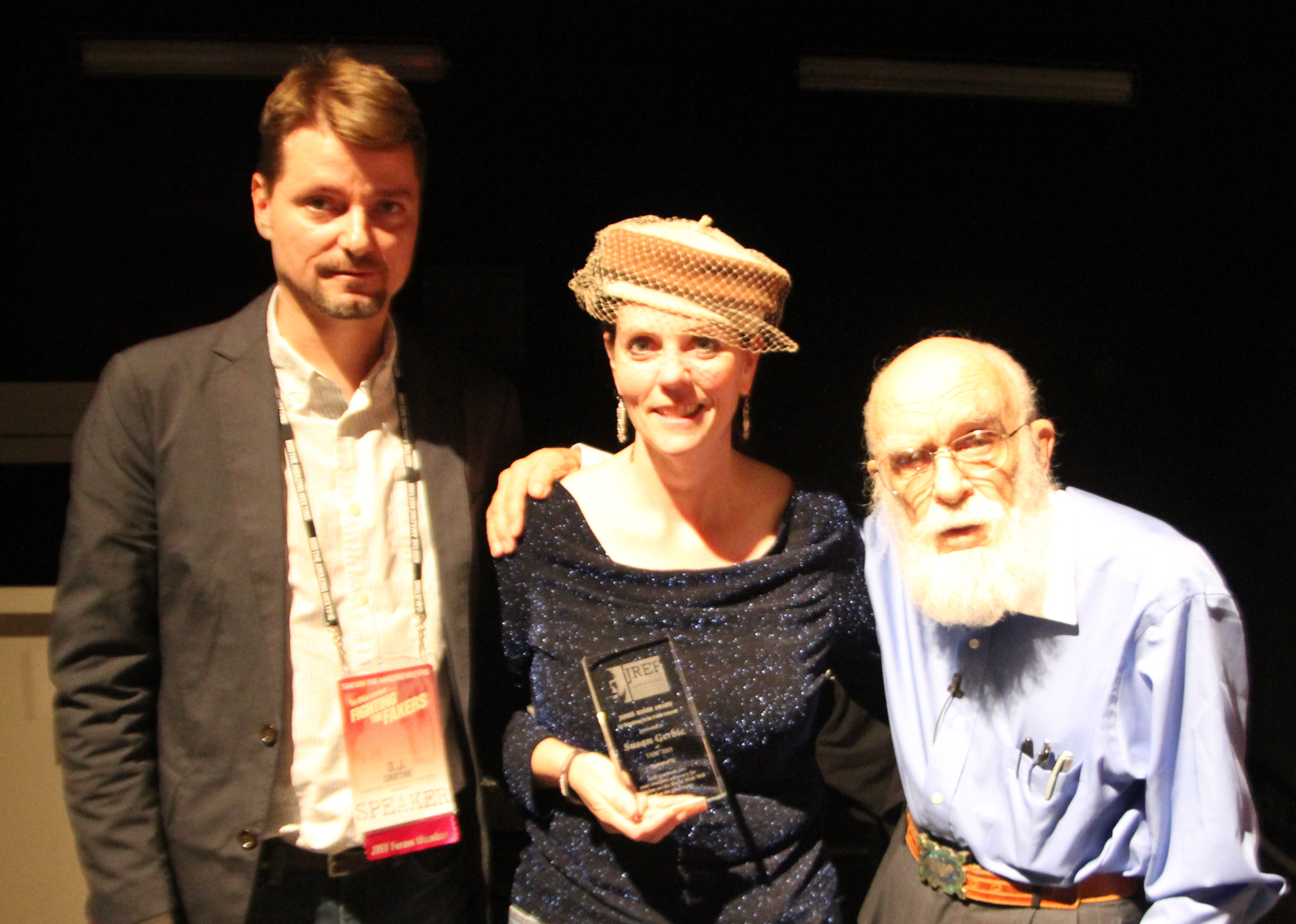
Gerbic, with D. J. Grothe (left) and James Randi (right), receives the James Randi Award for Skepticism in the Public Interest at The Amazing Meeting, July 2013

Much of Gerbic's activism has consisted of organizing sting operations against people claiming to be mediums. She and a group of volunteers calling themselves "Guerrilla Skeptics" would set up fake Facebook profiles, then visit mediums claiming to be receiving messages from the subjects of the profiles. Gerbic's team would record the session and post the evidence online.

In 2010, Gerbic founded "Guerrilla Skepticism on Wikipedia" (GSoW), a group of editors who create and edit Wikipedia articles that reflect scientific skepticism. The New York Times Magazine reported in February 2019, in an interview with Gerbic, that GSoW had 144 editors who had worked on nearly 900 Wikipedia pages.

=== Awards and honors ===
- "In the Trenches" award at the Committee for Skeptical Inquiry's 2012 Skeptic's Toolbox workshop
- "James Randi Award for Skepticism in the Public Interest" at The Amaz!ng Meeting 2013
- 2017 Award from James Randi Educational Foundation (shared with "her team of 'guerrilla skeptics'")
- Appointed fellow of the Committee for Skeptical Inquiry, February 2018
- 2019 Balles Award for Critical Thinking, Center for Inquiry
- 2022 National Capital Area Skeptics Philip J. Klass Award for outstanding contributions in critical thinking and scientific understanding

== Personal life ==
Gerbic married Robert Forsyth in 1983. The couple had two sons, and the marriage ended in 2002. From August 2018 until his death in August 2024, Gerbic was in a relationship with the mentalist Mark Edward.

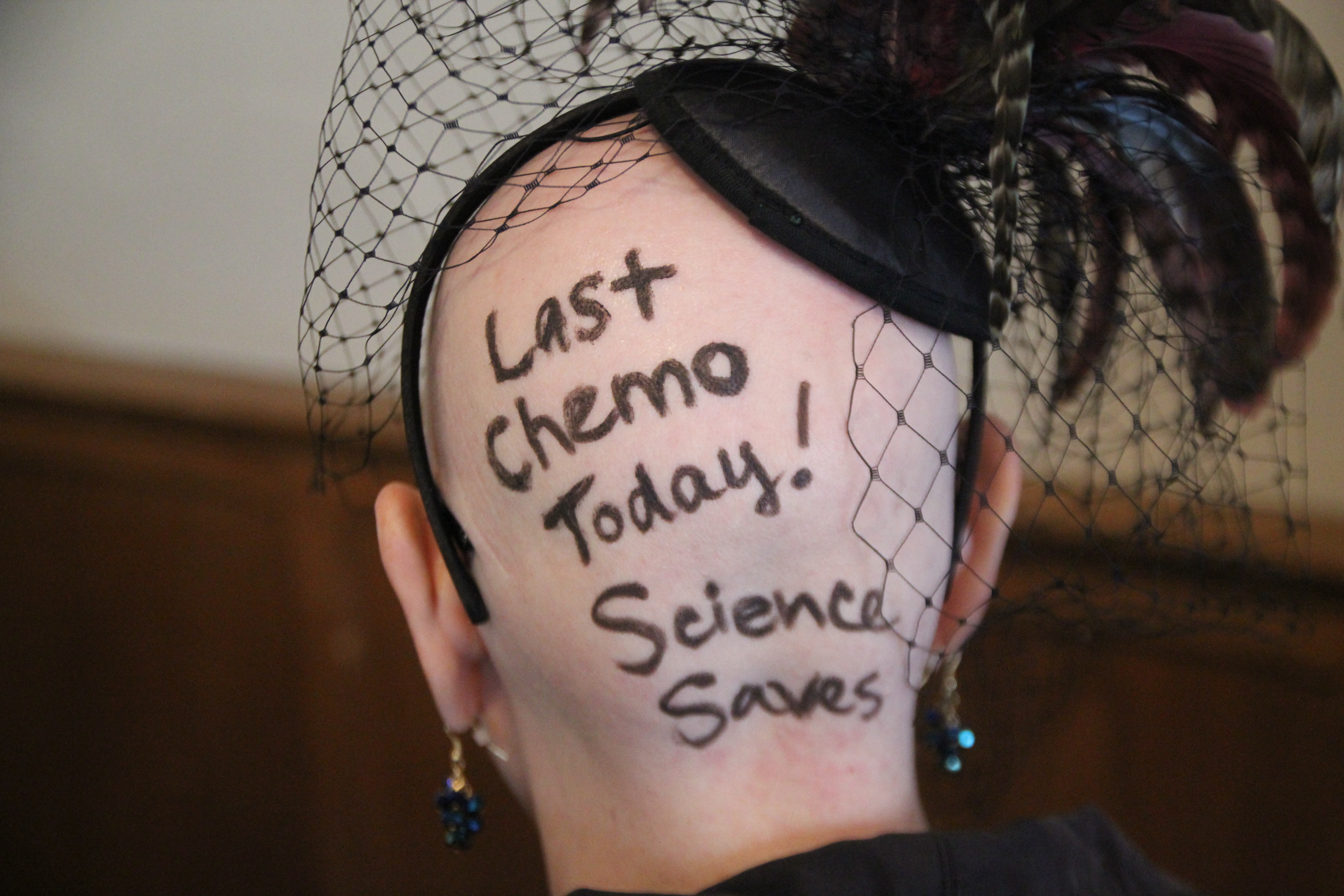
Gerbic in December 2013

In 2013, Gerbic discovered she had breast cancer. By December that year, Gerbic had completed chemotherapy, and by March 2014, radiation treatments. Gerbic continued to work throughout the treatment, and her follow-up mammogram revealed no cancer. She said the experience had made her tougher.

James Randi announcing Gerbic has won the JREF prize for 2017

Gerbic speaking about GSoW, 17th European Skeptics Congress, Wrocław, Poland

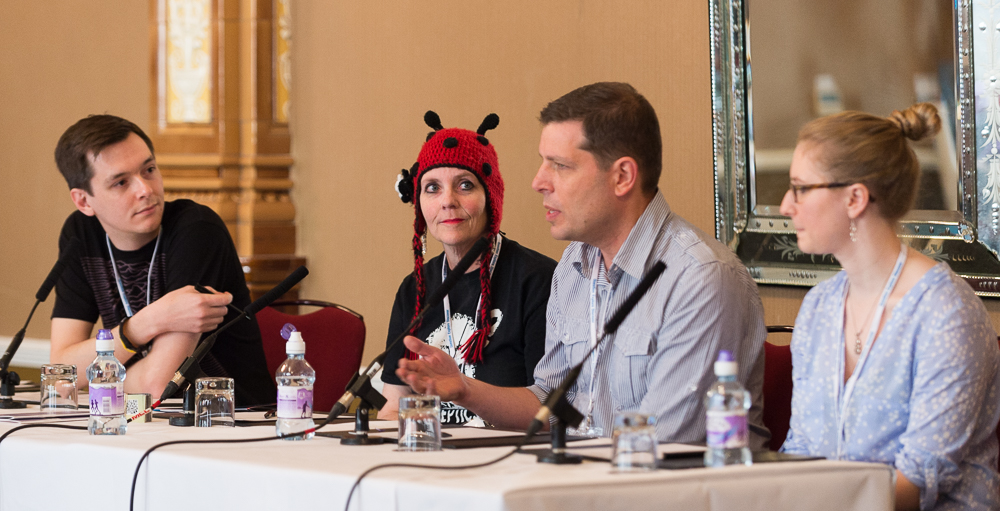
Gerbic (second left) at QEDcon 2014 with Michael Marshall, Eran Segev and Samantha Stein

== See also ==
- What's The Harm?
