= What's The Harm? =

Website about pseudoscience

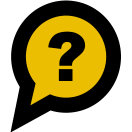

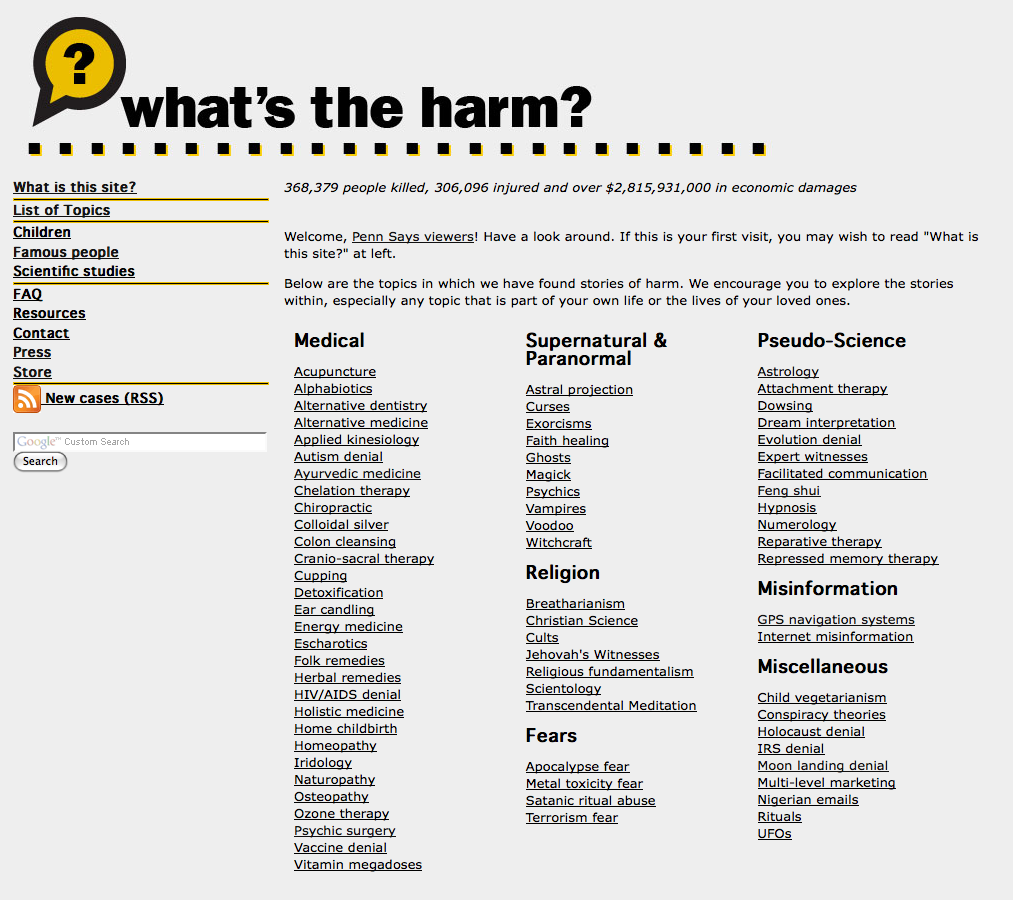
- Screenshot The main page of What's The Harm?
- Website type: Online database
- Available in: English
- Owner: Tim Farley
- Creator: Tim Farley
- Website: whatstheharm.net
- Commercial: No
- Registration: None
- Launched: January 22, 2008
- Current status: Active

What's The Harm? is a website providing a catalog of stories where people have been injured, killed, or otherwise disadvantaged (sometimes financially) by believing in misinformation, especially but not limited to accounts of harm caused by pseudoscientific organizations or claims. The creator of the site, Tim Farley, states that in launching the site on January 22, 2008, he aimed to increase the use of critical thinking.

== Content ==
The site defines its purpose as to "make a point about the danger of not thinking critically." According to the creator, the site presents examples of problems caused when people are misled about pseudoscientific practices. In the majority of cases, conventional medicine is forgone in favor of unconventional treatment. The site has identified over 300,000 people it claims have been killed and another 300,000 injured, as well as 2 to 3 billion dollars' worth of economic damages, based on what it considers to be dangerous practices ranging from acupuncture to vitamin mega-doses. The site also includes what ABC News calls "seemingly benign things" such as GPS, home birth, and vegetarianism.

== Reception ==
The site has gotten praise from the skeptic community. James Randi called the site "an important site" in a post to his SWIFT newsletter. James Randi Educational Foundation President Phil Plait posted in his Discover magazine blog, "Now when someone asks 'What's the harm?' you can send them right to What's The Harm.... It's a very interesting place to click around."

Skeptics Society Executive Director Michael Shermer has said of the site, "I think it's excellent. 'What's the harm?' is the question that all of us skeptics get asked whenever we do interviews on T.V. or debate people about irrational beliefs. And often, they are quite harmful." Penn Jillette called it "an amazingly great website" in his video blog Penn Says. "It's terrific, it's a great site. When someone says to you 'what's the harm' in a certain thing, go to What's The Harm and check it out." Further, an article by Matt Crowley in Skeptical Inquirer suggested that the harms involved in pursuing pseudoscience can be subtle and nuanced. Crowley's review of the What's the Harm? website proposed that if one does not employ critical thinking in this area, then that person will waste time on ideas that lack credibility and intellectual rigor. This could lead such a person into "... the byzantine complexity and disorienting incoherence of many fringe beliefs".

The site has been cited as a useful resource in mainstream media articles about alternative medicine, pseudoscience and the paranormal.

Others have criticized the site for what they consider to be extreme examples and bias towards one point of view over others. Len Torine of the American Vegetarian Association said of the site's vegetarianism page, "They're just extreme examples and has nothing to do with veganism or vegetarianism. It's just nonsense. It's just silly." Steven Novella admits that the stories only amount to anecdotal evidence, and that there are "plenty of stories of 'medical misadventures' in standard medicine" as well, so the site is not a substitute for scientific evidence, however he still believes the collected stories provide "legitimate cautionary tales."

== History ==
When speaking about the site's origins at a Skeptics in the Pub meeting in Boston, Farley said that after hearing Penn Jillette talk about The Amaz!ng Meeting (TAM), he decided to attend the conference's fifth installation. After being immersed in an environment with so many people dedicated to critical thinking, he asked himself "What can I do?"

In his interview on the Skepticality podcast he talks about his strong interest in science (he was a physics major at Georgia Tech) and how he never put his interests together toward any sort of activism. "It was like a bomb went off in my head", says Farley of his epiphany at the James Randi Educational Foundation (JREF) sponsored event. He noticed that stories of people being harmed by pseudoscience often appeared as a jumping-off point for articles about skepticism, but that there wasn't a single repository for these items.

Originally to be called "The Wall of Harm," it was envisioned to be a memorial much like the one at the Vietnam Veterans Memorial where the names of those victims who died as a result of pseudoscience or other non-critical thinking would be displayed. Farley hoped a reminder of "why we are here" would help unite skeptics in their campaign against such non-scientific practices and would motivate proponents of critical thinking at events like TAM. A series of discussions with colleagues led to the current incarnation: a categorized, searchable resource that Dr. Steven Novella says provides an answer to those "who do not see unscientific or fraudulent medicine as a problem."

In an interview with Richard Saunders on the Skeptic Zone podcast, Farley discussed how he wanted to try to stay focused on "concrete stories of people that actually got hurt" that he could cite with some kind of "decent documentation." He stated that he wanted to keep the format simple so that anyone could comfortably access the stories, on any browser and with no videos. He hopes to expand the site to include feature-length stories of some of the more documented or popular stories. Saunders stated that the site "has a wealth of information. If someone asks you, 'What's the harm?', you can run to this website and see that the harm is... lack of critical thinking".
