= Micro Focus Enterprise Security Products =

Micro Focus Enterprise Security
- Industry: Security software & Enterprise Software
- Products: ArcSight, Atalla, Fortify, TippingPoint
- Parent: Micro Focus
- Website: Enterprise Security page

The Micro Focus Enterprise Security Products business is part of the software business of Micro Focus. HP Enterprise Security Products was built from acquired companies Fortify Software, ArcSight, and TippingPoint and Atalla (from the acquisition of 3Com), which HP bought in 2010 and 2011. HPE has since sold TippingPoint and has announced the intention to divest the entire HP Enterprise Software business unit by spinning it out and merging it with Micro Focus. The merge concluded on September 1, 2017.

== Products ==
ArcSight and Fortify security technologies are designed to scan network activity and data to offer customers real-time application-level threat detection. ArcSight provides Security Information and Event Management (SIEM). Fortify provides application protection through the combination of static and dynamic application security testing.

Atalla products are cryptographic solutions and key management solutions.

TippingPoint products provide a network defence system. Announced in September 2013, TippingPoint Next-Generation Firewall (NGFW) is designed to block new risks introduced by cloud and mobile computing.

== Divestiture and sale ==
HP Enterprise sold TippingPoint to Trend Micro on October 21, 2015, for approximately $300 million.

On September 7, 2016, HPE CEO Meg Whitman announced that the software assets of Hewlett Packard Enterprise, including HP Enterprise Security Products, would be spun out and then merged with Micro Focus to create an independent company of which HP Enterprise shareholders would retain the majority ownership. Micro Focus CEO Kevin Loosemore called the transaction "entirely consistent with our established acquisition strategy and our focus on efficient management of mature infrastructure products" and indicated that Micro Focus intended to "bring the core earnings margin for the mature assets in the deal - about 80 per cent of the total - from 21 per cent today to Micro Focus's existing 46 per cent level within three years."

== HP Protect customer event ==
In 2004, HP introduced an annual event for customers called HP Protect, which focuses on security and compliance issues. HP Protect 2013 took place on September 16–19 in Washington D.C. HP Protect 2014 is scheduled to occur on September 8–11, 2014 in Washington, D.C.

== See also ==
- ArcSight
- Atalla
- Fortify
- TippingPoint
