= Skepticality =

Skeptical podcast

'Skepticality'
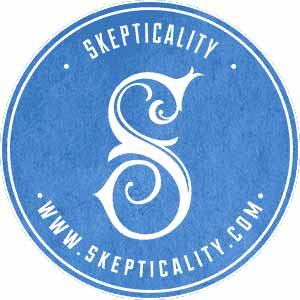

Presentation
- Hosted by: Derek Colanduno · "Swoopy"
- Genre: science / news
- Language: English
- Updates: Biweekly

Publication
- Original release: 1 April 2005 – 28 August 2019
- Ratings: Non-explicit

Related
- Skepticality theme

Skepticality was the official podcast of The Skeptics Society's Skeptic magazine. Beginning in May 2005, the podcast explores rational thought, skeptical ideas, and famous myths from around the world and throughout history. Each episode is an audio magazine featuring regular segments by contributors who are specialized in specific areas of critical thought followed by featured content which is usually in the form of an interview with a researcher, author, or individual who is helping promote skeptical thought and/or science in an effective way. It has featured interviews with James Randi, and scientists, such as authors and astronomers Phil Plait and Neil deGrasse Tyson, Greg Graffin from Bad Religion, Adam Savage from the MythBusters, songwriter Jill Sobule, author Ann Druyan and science communicator Bill Nye.

Skepticality is co-hosted by Derek Colanduno and "Swoopy" Robynn McCarthy.

The last released episode is from 28 August 2019.

== History ==
The concept and the name Skepticality were created in May 2005 by Robynn McCarthy and Derek Colanduno, after the two became friends in Las Vegas. At the time, Colanduno was working at a national Sports Radio network and a privately owned Alternative Rock Station (KEDG) during the overnight shift. Skepticality gained notability on September 7, 2005 during a keynote address, when Apple CEO Steve Jobs mentioned it as one of the top nine podcasts at the iTunes Music Store. On August 14, 2006, Skepticality became Skeptic magazine's official podcast.

== Featured segments ==
- Tim Farley of What's The Harm?, Skeptools.com and Virtual Skeptics.com regularly contributes pieces of skeptic history with this segment titled Skepticism, Past and Future. First called A Few Minutes of Skeptic History, it debuted on episode 123 on March 3, 2010.
- Bob Carroll from The Skeptics Dictionary debuted with a segment on logical fallacies called Unnatural Virtue, March 27, 2012.
- Jarrett Kaufman and Wendy Hughes from the Independent Investigations Group debuted April 25, 2012 with a segment centered on the coincidence website The Odds Must Be Crazy. Kaufman was replaced by John Rael on September 10, 2012. Rael is best known for his creation of skepticallypwnd, a group of comedic skeptics, or skeptical comedians, whose objective is to question pseudoscience in a humorous way.
- Heather Henderson was a contributor from November 2012 and April 2013 with a segment entitled The News in Religion. In it, Heather presents current events and opinions around the topics of atheism, deism and the effects of religion on the general population. Heather is currently the lead vocalist of Penn Jillette's NoGod Band in Las Vegas and along with Emery Emery publishes two podcasts, Ardent Atheist and Skeptically Yours.
- Robert Blaskiewicz and Eve Siebert joined Skepticality with their segment Skeptical Humanities in Episode 226 on February 18, 2014. The segment presents examples of mainstream research & critical thinking as it pertains to the humanities such as art, philosophy, history, literature, rhetoric, aesthetics, literary criticism, pop culture studies, folklore, and cultural studies.
- Susan Gerbic of Guerrilla Skepticism on Wikipedia (GSoW) has also made regular appearances on Skepticality, providing updates about the GSoW project since January 2013.

== Recurrent guests ==
The show has a number of guests who have been featured on more than one show. Amongst them are James Randi, Phil Plait, Pamela Gay and skeptical musician George Hrab.

== Asteroids ==
In an interview with Derek during the June 1, 2006 episode of Slacker Astronomy, the naming of Asteroids 106545 Colanduno and 106537 McCarthy was announced to the world. The asteroids were named in homage to the hosts of Skepticality by their discoverer Jeff Medkeff, who said, "My naming of these asteroids for you is a token of my esteem for you and your accomplishments."

== Awards ==
In 2007, Skepticality was recognized for excellence in podcasting with the Best Speculative Fiction News Podcast award at the Parsec Awards and Best Science Podcast award at the Podcast Peer Awards, selected by registered fellow podcasters. Both presentations were made at Dragon*Con 2007 in Atlanta, Georgia.

On November 22, 2007, the Skepticality podcast was listed as "Site of the Week" on SciFi.com's Sci Fi Weekly.

On August 9, 2008, Skepticality was named "Podcast of the Week" by The Times.

In April 2014, Skepticality received the Ockham Award at QED for Best Podcast. The award was accepted on behalf of Derek and Swoopy by Susan Gerbic.

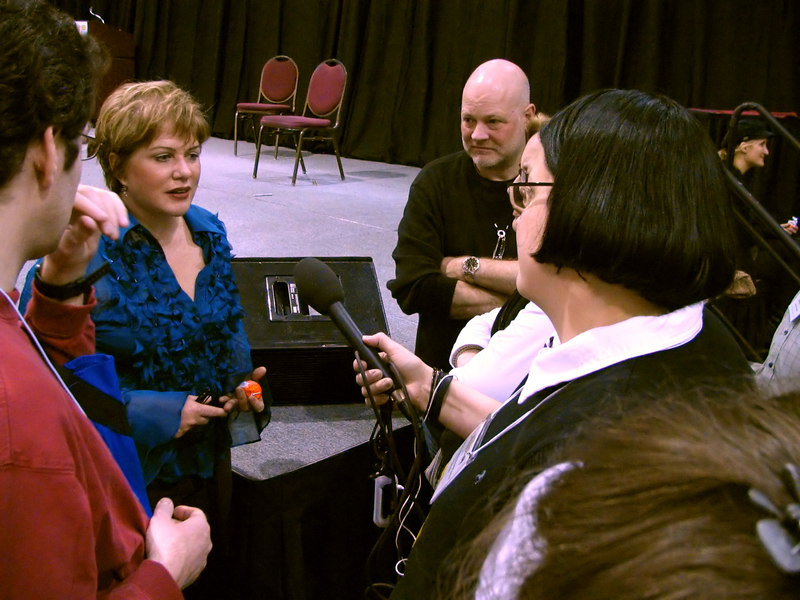
Swoopy interviews Julia Sweeney 2007

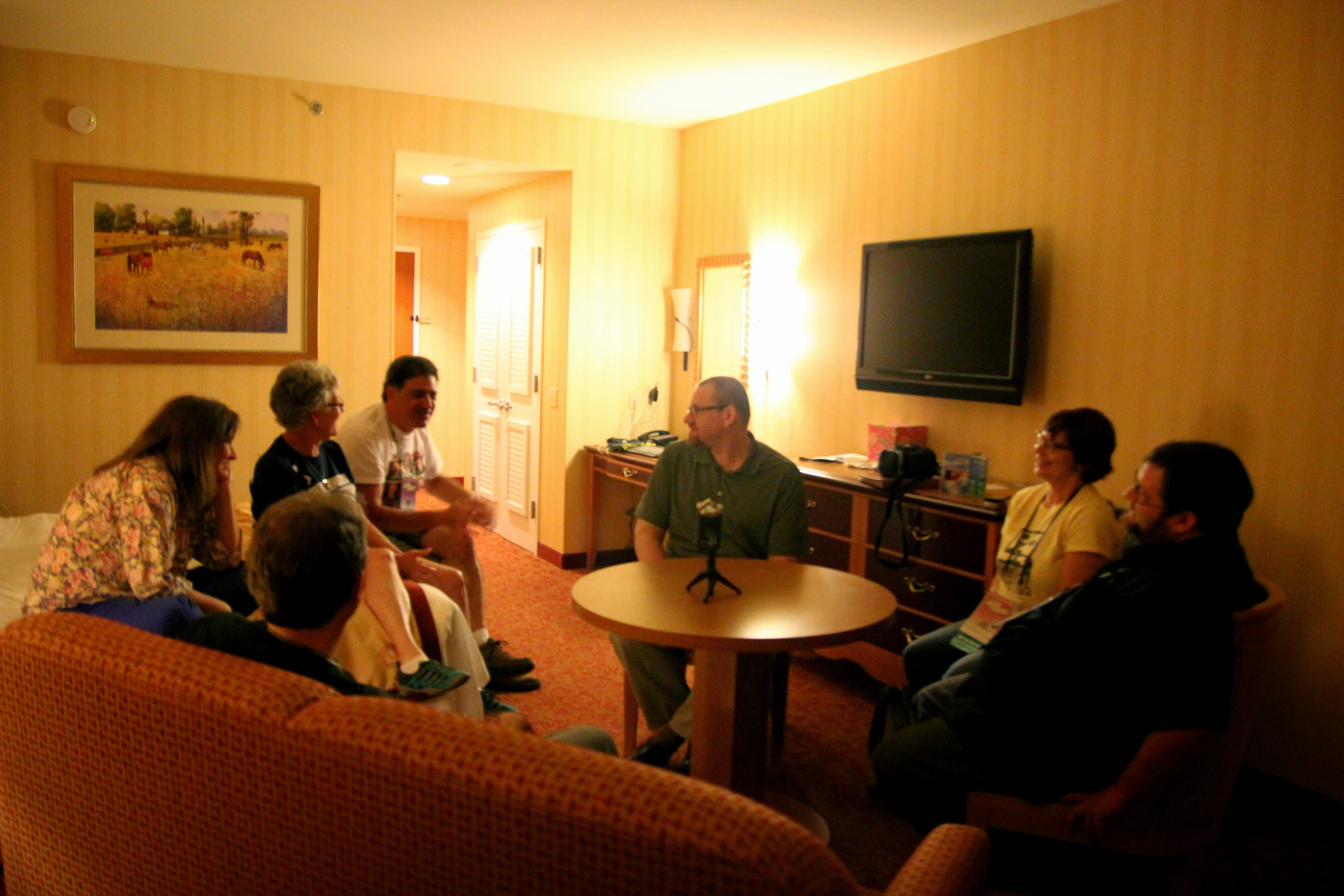
Recording at TAM 2013

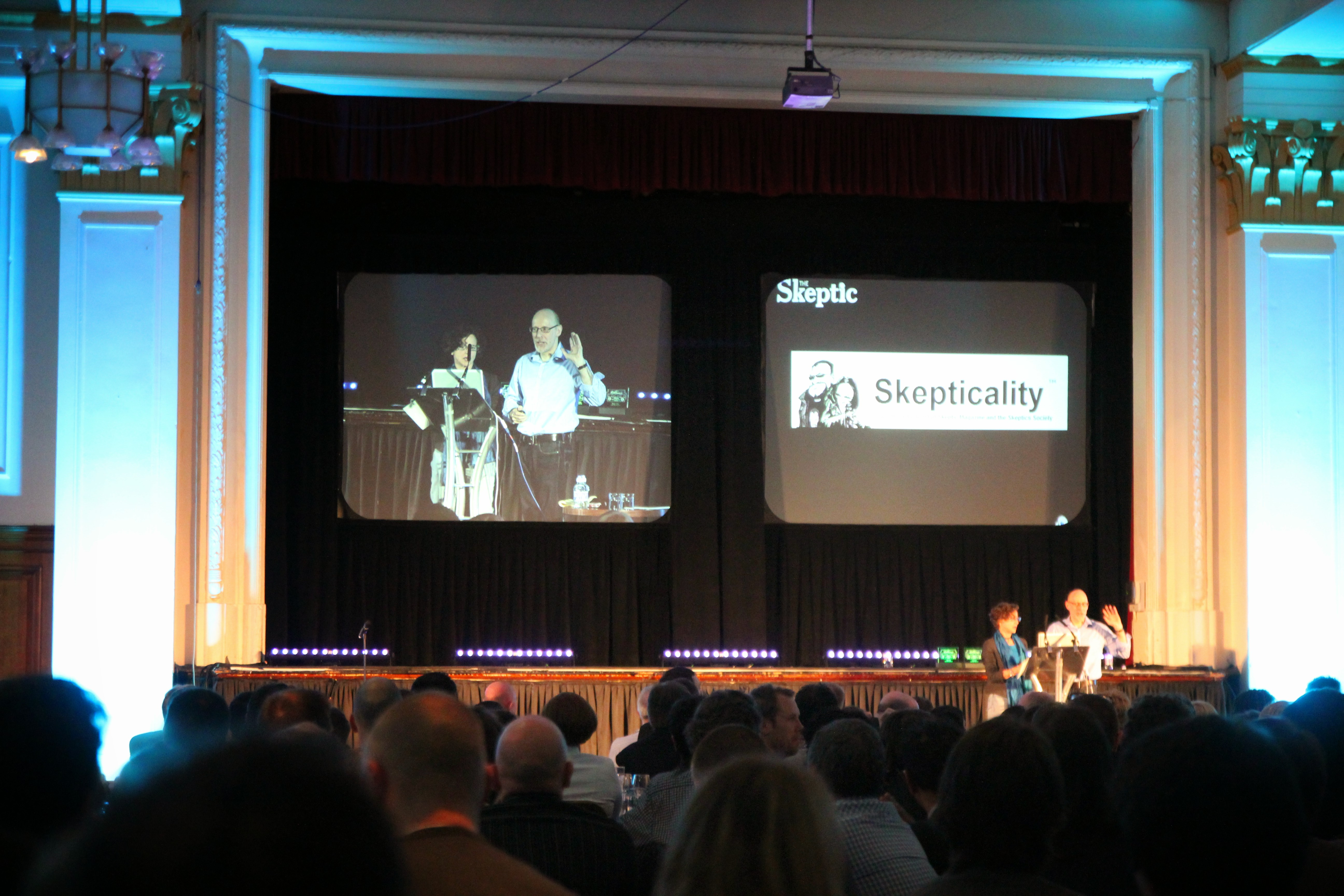
Skepticality Podcast wins Ockham Award QED 2014
