= Monica the Medium =

American reality television series

- Genre: Reality
- Starring: Monica Ten-Kate; Krista Gray; Kayla Williams; Kirsten Johnson
- Country of origin: United States
- Original language: English
- No. of seasons: 2
- No. of episodes: 20

Production
- Executive producers: Dave Caplan; Malachi McGlone
- Production companies: Trooper Entertainment; Lionsgate Television

Original release
- Network: Freeform
- Release: August 25, 2015 – June 27, 2016

Monica the Medium is an American reality television series about Monica Ten-Kate, a student at Pennsylvania State University who claims to be able to communicate with the dead. The show premiered August 25, 2015, on ABC Family. On October 26, 2015, the show got picked up for a second season that premiered on April 25, 2016.

== Cast ==
- Monica Ten-Kate
- Krista Gray, Monica's roommate and best friend
- Kayla Williams, Monica's roommate
- Kirsten Johnson, Monica's roommate
- Tyler, Monica's boyfriend

== Episodes ==
=== Season 1 (2015) ===
| No. overall | No. in season | Title | Original release date | US viewers (millions) |
|---|---|---|---|---|
| 1 | 1 | "Blind Date Surprise" | August 25, 2015 | 0.38 |
| 2 | 2 | "Spirit at Work" | September 1, 2015 | 0.43 |
| 3 | 3 | "Spirit Needs an Office" | September 8, 2015 | 0.43 |
| 4 | 4 | "Junior Slump" | September 15, 2015 | 0.41 |
| 5 | 5 | "Heaven on Hold" | September 22, 2015 | 0.34 |
| 6 | 6 | "Bun in the Oven" | September 29, 2015 | 0.30 |
| 7 | 7 | "Missing Person" | October 6, 2015 | 0.41 |
| 8 | 8 | "Road Trip" | October 13, 2015 | 0.40 |
| 9 | 9 | "Finals Week" | October 20, 2015 | 0.53 |
| 10 | 10 | "Stay or Go" | October 27, 2015 | 0.63 |

=== Season 2 (2016) ===
| No. overall | No. in season | Title | Original release date | US viewers (millions) |
|---|---|---|---|---|
| 11 | 1 | "San Diego Bound" | April 25, 2016 | 0.33 |
| 12 | 2 | "Roommates Wanted" | May 2, 2016 | 0.29 |
| 13 | 3 | "Housewarming Fiesta" | May 9, 2016 | 0.31 |
| 14 | 4 | "That's What Friends Aren't For" | May 16, 2016 | 0.30 |
| 15 | 5 | "A Gift That Keeps on Giving" | May 23, 2016 | 0.18 |
| 16 | 6 | "There's Something Fishy Going On" | May 30, 2016 | 0.37 |
| 17 | 7 | "Family Matters" | June 6, 2016 | 0.29 |
| 18 | 8 | "Muddy Waters" | June 13, 2016 | 0.28 |
| 19 | 9 | "Hot Fun in the Sun" | June 20, 2016 | 0.33 |
| 20 | 10 | "School Spirit" | June 27, 2016 | 0.25 |
