= James Randi Educational Foundation =

American grant-making foundation

- Founded: 1996
- Founder: James Randi
- Type: 501(c)(3)
- Registration no.: 65-0649443
- Purpose: Promote critical thinking and investigate claims of the paranormal, pseudoscientific, and supernatural
- Location: Falls Church, Virginia
- Key people: Banachek, President; Rick Adams, Treasurer/Assis. Secretary, Board of Directors; Daniel "Chip" Denman, Secretary, Board of Directors
- Revenue: US$−35,258 in 2022. ▼US$268,727 in 2021. ▲US$257,818 in 2020. ▲US$88,828 in 2019. ▼US$630,928 in 2018. ▲US$156,615 in 2017. ▼US$1,133,731 in 2014 ▲US $887,595 in 2013. ▼ ▼US $1,293,878 in 2012. ▼US $1,564,266 in 2011. US$852,445 (2009) ▼38% on 2008. ▲17% on 2009.
- Website: web.randi.org

The James Randi Educational Foundation (JREF) is an American grant-making institution founded in 1996 by magician and skeptic James Randi. As a nonprofit organization, the mission of JREF includes educating the public and the media on the dangers of accepting unproven claims, and to support research into paranormal claims in controlled scientific experimental conditions. The organization announced its change to a grant-making foundation in September 2015.

The organization previously administered the One Million Dollar Paranormal Challenge, a prize of one million U.S. dollars to anyone who could demonstrate a supernatural or paranormal ability under agreed-upon scientific testing criteria.

The organization has been funded through member contributions, grants, and conferences, though it ceased accepting memberships after 2015. For several years, the JREF website published the blog Swift, which included news and information as well as exposés of paranormal claimants.

== History ==
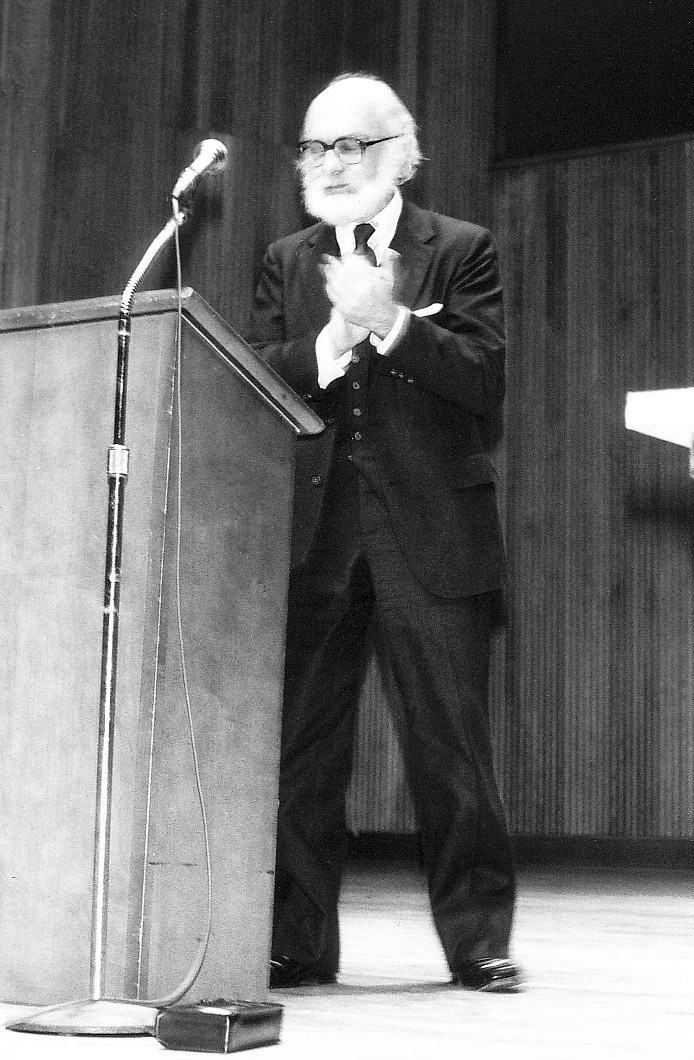
Founder James Randi in 1983

The James Randi Educational Foundation (JREF) officially came into existence on February 29, 1996, when it was registered as a nonprofit corporation in the State of Delaware in the United States. On April 3, 1996, James Randi formally announced the creation of JREF through his email hotline.

THE FOUNDATION IS IN BUSINESS! It is my great pleasure to announce the creation of the James Randi Educational Foundation. This is a non-profit, tax-exempt, educational foundation under Section 501(c)3 of the Internal Revenue Code, incorporated in the State of Delaware. The Foundation is generously funded by a sponsor in Washington D.C. who wishes, at this point in time, to remain anonymous.

— The Foundation, Randi Hotline, Wed, April 3, 1996

JREF is now headquartered in Falls Church, Virginia.

Randi stated that Johnny Carson was a major sponsor, giving several six-figure donations.

From 2003 to 2015, JREF annually hosted The Amazing Meeting (styled as The Amaz!ng Meeting), a gathering of scientists, skeptics, and atheists. Perennial speakers included Richard Dawkins, Penn & Teller, Phil Plait, Michael Shermer, and Adam Savage.

In 2008, the astronomer Philip Plait became the new president of JREF, and Randi became its board chairman. In December 2009, Plait left JREF due to involvement in a television project, and D.J. Grothe assumed the position of president on January 1, 2010, holding the position until his departure from the organization was announced on September 1, 2014.

The San Francisco newspaper SF Weekly reported in August 2009, that Randi's annual salary was about $200,000.

Randi resigned from JREF in 2015.

As of January 2024, JREF leadership consisted of:

- President: Banachek (Steven Shaw) of Las Vegas, Nevada
- Secretary: Daniel Denman of Silver Spring, Maryland
- Treasurer / Assistant Secretary: Richard L. Adams Jr. of Fort Lauderdale, Florida

== One Million Dollar Paranormal Challenge ==
In 1964, Randi began offering a prize of US$1,000 to anyone who could demonstrate a paranormal ability under agreed-upon testing conditions. This prize was later increased to US$1 million in bonds and was administered by JREF. Since its inception, more than 1,000 people applied to be tested.

The Challenge was eventually terminated, with JREF noting in 2015, "We can no longer justify the resources to interact with these people." No applicants managed to demonstrate their claimed abilities under the testing conditions, with all applicants either failing to demonstrate the claimed ability during the test or deviating from the foundation conditions for taking the test.

== Podcasts and videos ==
The foundation produced two audio podcasts, For Good Reason which was an interview program hosted by D.J. Grothe, promoting critical thinking and skepticism about the central beliefs of society. It has not been active since December 2011. Consequence was a biweekly podcast hosted by former outreach coordinator Brian Thompson in which regular people shared their personal narratives about the negative impact a belief in pseudoscience, superstition, and the paranormal had had on their lives. It has not been active since May, 2013.

The JREF also produced a regular video cast and YouTube show, The Randi Show, in which former JREF outreach coordinator Brian Thompson interviewed Randi on a variety of skeptical topics, often with lighthearted or comedic commentary. It has not been active since August 2012. In November 2015, Harriet Hall produced a series of ten lectures called Science Based Medicine for the JREF. The videos deal with various complementary alternative medicine subjects including homeopathy, chiropractic, acupuncture, and more.

The JREF posted many of its educational videos from The Amaz!ng Meeting and other events online. There are lectures by Neil DeGrasse Tyson, Carol Tavris, Lawrence Krauss, live tests of the One Million Dollar Paranormal Challenge, workshops on cold reading by Ray Hyman, and panels featuring leading thinking on various topics related to JREF's educational mission on the JREF YouTube channel. JREF past president D.J. Grothe has claimed that the JREF's YouTube channel was once the "10th most subscribed nonprofit channel of all time", though its status in 2013 was 39th and most non-profits do not register for this status.

The foundation produced its own "Internet Audio Show" which ran January–December 2002 and was broadcast via a live stream. The archive can be found as mp3 files on the JREF website and as a podcast on iTunes.

== Forum and online community ==
As part of the JREF's goal of educating the general population about science and reason, people involved in their community ran a popular skeptic based online forum with the overall goal of promoting "critical thinking and providing the public with the tools needed to reliably examine paranormal, supernatural, and pseudoscientific claims".

On October 5, 2014, this online forum was divorced from the JREF and moved as its own entity to the International Skeptics Forum.

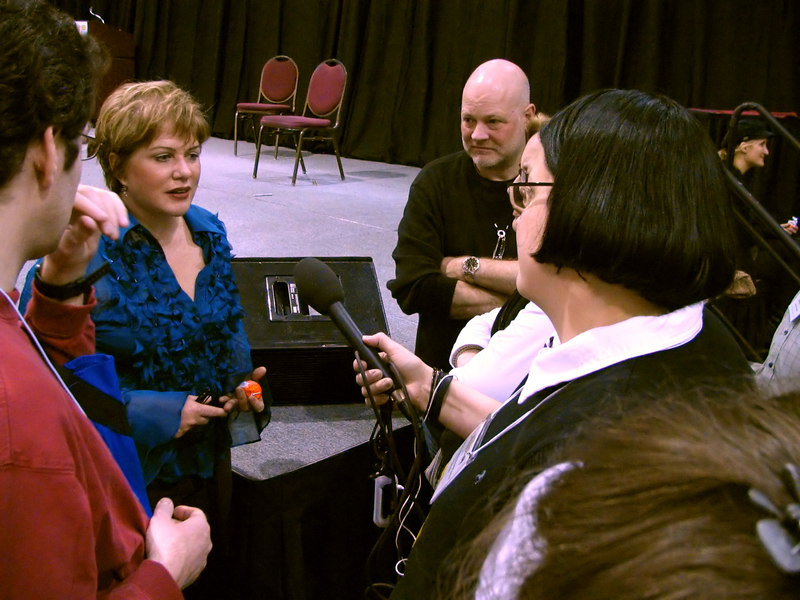
Swoopy from Skepticality podcast interviews actress and comedienne Julia Sweeney at The Amazing Meeting.

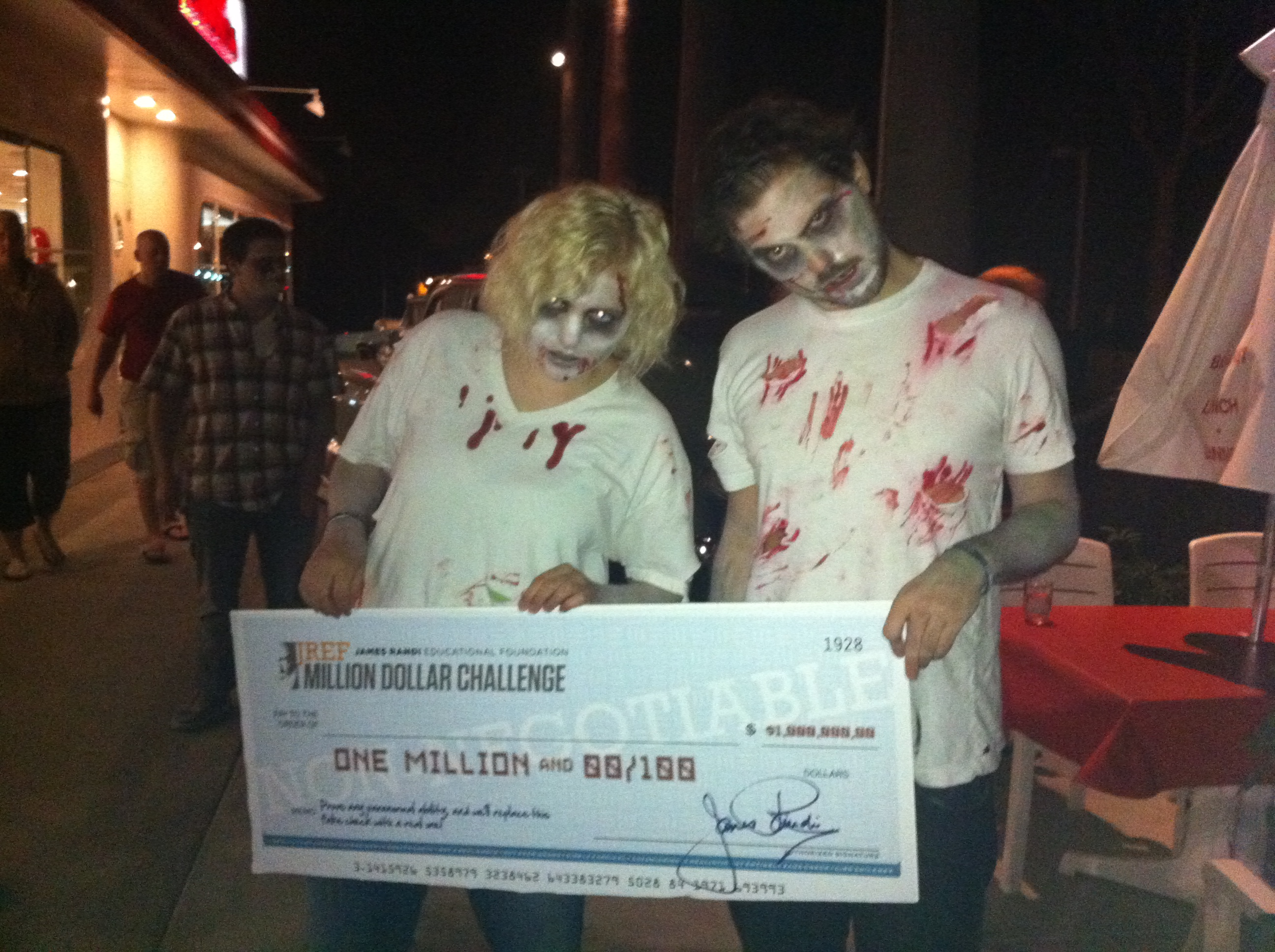
Two zombies hold a check for one million dollars for James Van Praagh if he can prove he can talk to the dead.

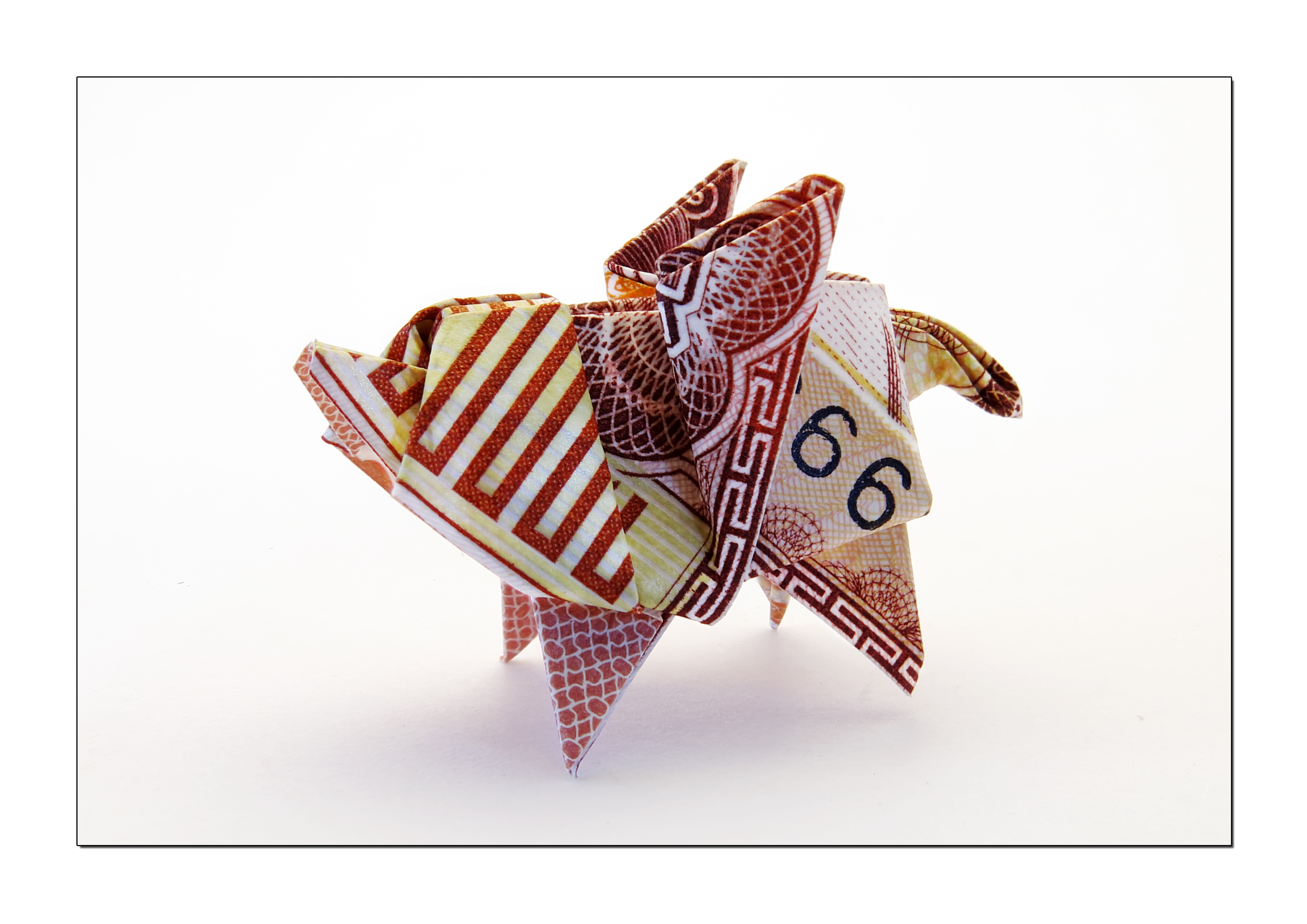
Origami Pigasus invented for the JREF by Richard Saunders

The JREF has also helped to support local grassroot efforts and outreach endeavors, such as SkeptiCamp, Camp Inquiry, and various community-organized conferences. However, according to their tax filing, they spend less than $2,000 a year on other organizations or individuals.

== JREF Award ==
James Randi announces Susan Gerbic has won the JREF prize for 2017.

The JREF Award "is given to the person or organization that best represents the spirit of the foundation by encouraging critical questions and seeking unbiased, fact-based answers." Some of the recipients include the following:

- 2017: Susan Gerbic
- 2018: Jen Gunter
- 2020: Sarah McAnulty
- 2022: Kathleen Dyer and Raymond Hall
- 2023: Janyce Boynton
- 2024: Office for Science and Society
- 2025: Lilienfeld Alliance
- 2026: Skeptoid Media

== See also ==
- An Encyclopedia of Claims, Frauds, and Hoaxes of the Occult and Supernatural (by Randi)
- Debunker
- List of prizes for evidence of the paranormal
- Pigasus Award
- Rationalist Prabir Ghosh increases his challenge amount to $50,000 against any claim of paranormal, after surviving nine assassination attempts.
- The Skeptic's Dictionary, by Robert Todd Carroll
