= D. J. Grothe =

American writer and public speaker (born 1973)

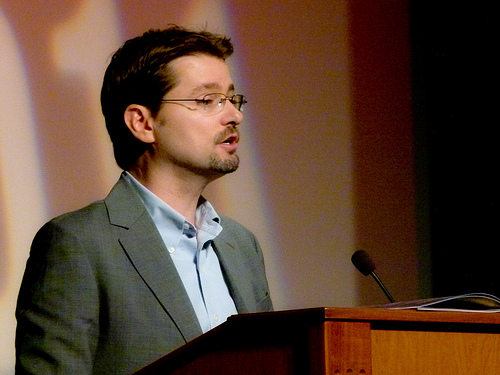
- Grothe in 2011
- Born: Douglas James Grothe; June 25, 1973 (age 53); St. Louis, Missouri, US
- Education: Washington University in St. Louis
- Occupations: Magician, writer, skeptic

Douglas James Grothe (born June 25, 1973) is an American skeptic who has served in leadership roles for both the Center for Inquiry (CFI) and the James Randi Educational Foundation. While he was at CFI, he hosted their Point of Inquiry podcast. After leaving Point of Inquiry he hosted the radio show and podcast For Good Reason. He is particularly interested in the psychology of belief and the steps involved in deception and self-deception. His writing has been published by both Skeptical Inquirer magazine and The Huffington Post. He also co-edited On the Beauty of Science, about the worldview and life's work of the Nobel laureate Herbert Hauptman.

Grothe serves as a board member of The Institute for Science and Human Values.

== Career ==
=== Magic ===
Using his experience as a professional magician, Grothe lectures about the intersection of magic and skepticism.

=== The Center for Inquiry ===
As a graduate student at Washington University in St. Louis, Grothe became involved with a student freethought group there called WULF, the Washington University League of Freethinkers, as well as the Council for Secular Humanism. This second group was affiliated with The Center for Inquiry, and served as an entry point into this organization.

Grothe was a member of the Center for Inquiry for ten years. From 2005 until 2009 he hosted Point of Inquiry, the official podcast of the organization. He traveled extensively to lecture on subjects such as "ethics, religious-political extremism, church-state separation, skepticism and science advocacy". In 2009, while serving as vice president and director of outreach programs, Grothe left CFI to serve as president of the James Randi Educational Foundation.

=== James Randi Educational Foundation ===
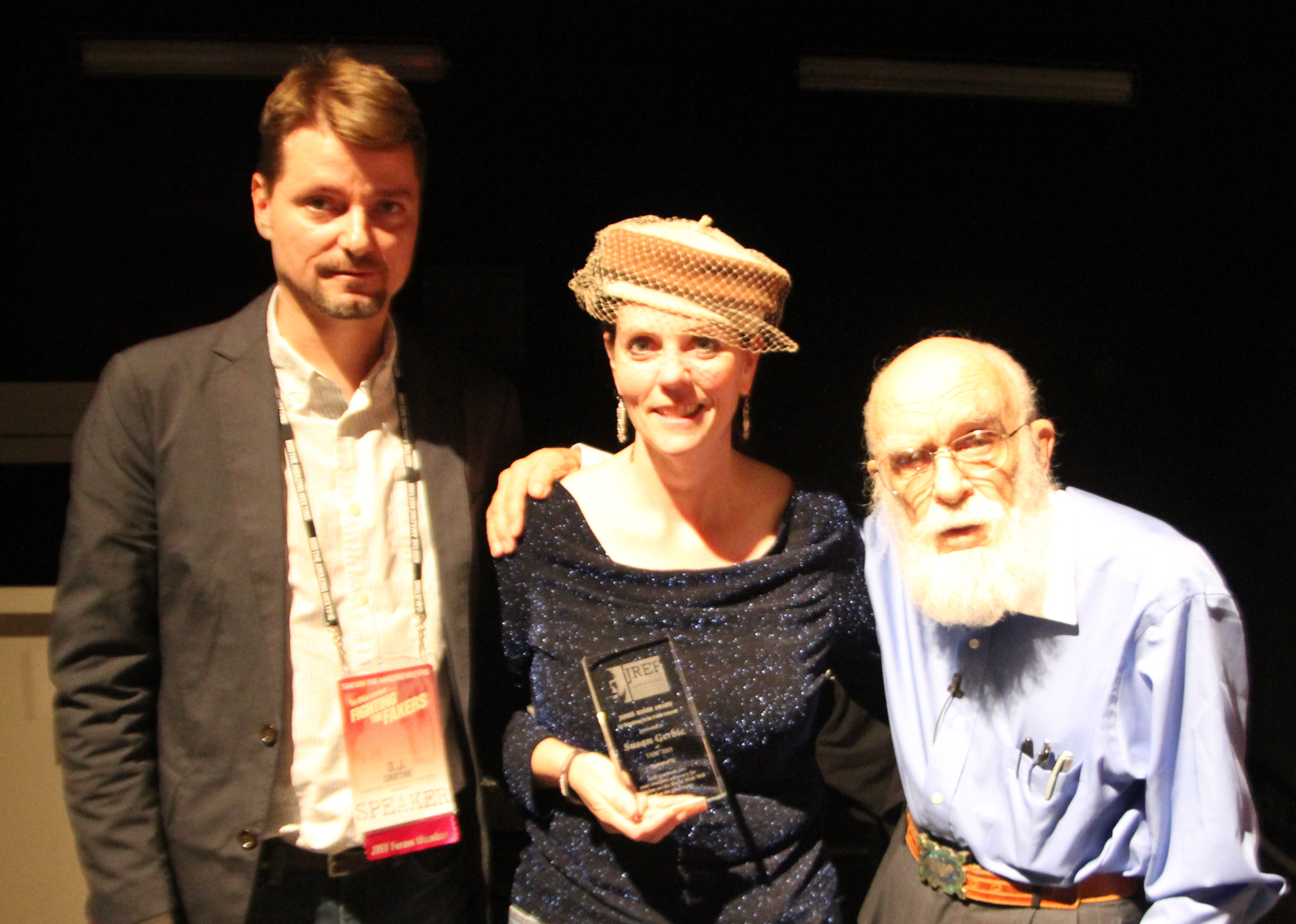
D. J. Grothe, Susan Gerbic, James Randi

Grothe succeeded Phil Plait as president of the James Randi Educational Foundation (JREF) and served in that capacity from January 1, 2010, until September 1, 2014. From January 2010 until December 2011 Grothe hosted For Good Reason, a podcast associated with the JREF.

Guests on For Good Reason included James Randi on the importance of JREF programs, Daniel Loxton on a book about evolution for children, Jamy Ian Swiss on psychics and their deceptive methods, the social psychologist Carol Tavris talking about dissonance theory, and Richard Dawkins talking about Darwin Day and creation and evolution in public education, among dozens of other guests he has interviewed.

=== Challenges to celebrity psychics ===
Grothe challenged celebrity psychic James Van Praagh to prove his claims of psychic mediumship and communication with the dead a number of times in the news media, and organized a "zombie attack" featuring volunteers from the James Randi Educational Foundation of one of Van Praagh's "Spirit Circles", which net Van Praagh thousands of dollars from his clients seeking communication with their deceased loved ones. This was to publicize both that Van Praagh refuses the JREF's One Million Dollar Paranormal Challenge and how the JREF considers Van Praagh's claims to communicate with dead people to be unfounded and harmful.

Grothe has also spoken out against celebrity psychics Theresa Caputo (the Long Island Medium) and John Edward, criticizing them for taking advantage of the grieving by using a collection of psychological manipulations commonly referred to as cold reading, and has also criticized companies like Priceline.com and national media figures such as Dr. Phil for giving a platform to such psychic performers. He has challenged Uri Geller's claims covered in the The New York Times about being a magician.
