= List of books about skepticism =

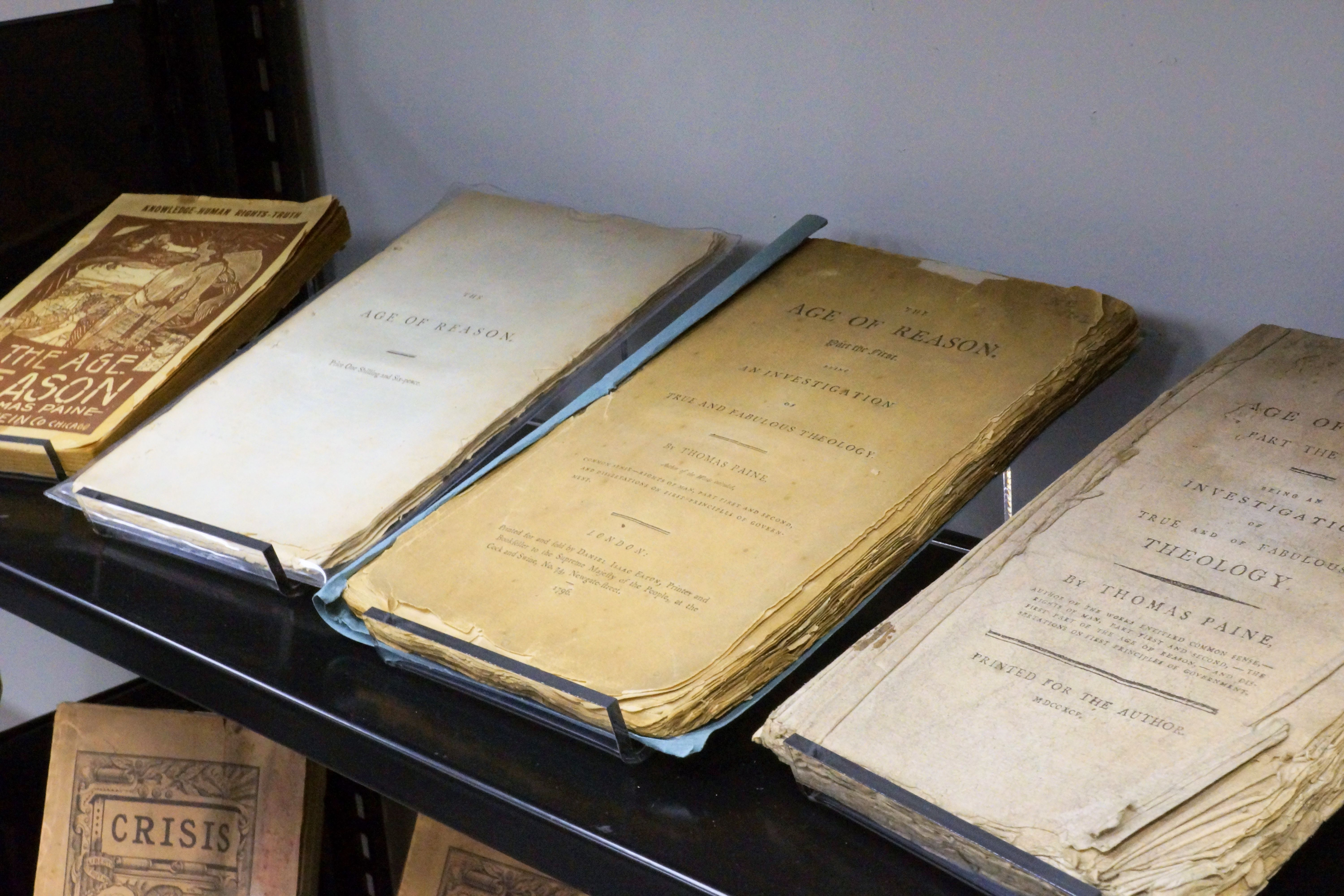
The Age of Reason – A rare, original copy on display at the Center for Inquiry library in Amherst, NY.

This list of books about skepticism is a skeptic's library of works centered on scientific skepticism, religious skepticism, critical thinking, scientific literacy, and refutation of claims of the paranormal. It also includes titles about atheism, irreligion, books for "young skeptics" and related subjects. It is intended as a starting point for research into these areas of study.

Collections in the realm of skepticism, science literacy, and freethought exist both online and in brick-and-mortar libraries. The complete works of Robert G. Ingersoll are available online at both the Secular Web and as part of the Internet Archive project The Drew University Library hosts a collection of pamphlets by and about Mr. Ingersoll. In 2013 the Library of Congress announced the opening of the Seth MacFarlane Collection of the Carl Sagan and Ann Druyan Archive which includes more than 1,500 boxes of donated material. MacFarlane donated the funds which allowed the Library of Congress to purchase a collection of Sagan's notes from Druyan (widow of Sagan) because of his concern over fading science literacy.

== Books ==
To sort the table, click the arrow in any header cell.

Author(s)/Editor(s)	Category	Title	ISBN or WorldCat	Publisher	Edition	Year
Stea, Jonathan N.	Scientific skepticism	Mind the Science: Saving Your Mental Health from the Wellness Industry	978-0197748817	Oxford University Press	1st	2024
White, Andrew Dickson	Religious skepticism	A History of the Warfare of Science with Theology in Christendom	-	Macmillan & Company	1st	1897
Steve Novella with Bob Novella, Cara Santa Maria, Jay Novella, and Evan Bernstein	Scientific skepticism	The Skeptics' Guide to the Universe: How to Know What's Really Real in a World Increasingly Full of Fake	978-1538760512	Grand Central Publishing	1st	2018
Carroll, Sean M.		The Big Picture On the Origins of Life, Meaning and the Universe Itself	0525954821	Dutton	Illustrated	2016
Wilson, Robert A	Philosophy	Cosmic Trigger I: The Final Secret of the Illuminati	0692513973	Hilaritas Press, 24th printing, 2013	Paperback	1978
Blackmore, Susan	Scientific skepticism	Beyond the Body: An Investigation of Out-of-the-Body Experiences	0897333446	Academy Chicago Publishers	Paperback	1992
Selman, Jeffrey	Creationism	God Sent Me: A Textbook Case on Evolution vs. Creation	978-0578152554	Blossom Press(self-published)	Softcover	2015
Dobelli, Rolf	Logic	The Art of Thinking Clearly	978-0062219695	Harper Paperbacks	Paperback	2013
Humes, Edward	Creationism	Monkey Girl: Evolution, Education, Religion, and the Battle for America's Soul	978-0060885496	Harper Perennial	Paperback	2008
Lebo, Lauri	Creationism	The Devil in Dover: An Insider's Story of Dogma V. Darwin in Small-town America	978-1595584519	The New Press	Paperback	2009
Entine, Jon	Scientific skepticism	Let Them Eat Precaution: How Politics is Undermining the Genetic Revolution in Agriculture	978-0844742007	Aei Press	Hardcover	2005
Twain, Mark	Religious skepticism	Christian Science				1907
Harari, Yuval Noah	Scientific skepticism	Sapiens: A Brief History of Humankind	978-0062316097	Harper	Hardcover	2015
Browne, Thomas	Scientific skepticism	Pseudodoxia Epidemica: Or, Enquiries into Very Many Received Tenentes, and Commonly Presumed Truths	978-0198127062	Clarendon Press	Hardcover	1981 (orig. 1646)
Loftus, Elizabeth; Katherine Ketcham	Scientific skepticism	The Myth of Repressed Memory: False Memories and Allegations of Sexual Abuse	978-0312141233	St. Martin's Griffin	1st edition	1996
Swift, Jonathan	Scientific skepticism	A Modest Proposal and Other Satires	978-0879759193	Prometheus Books	Reprint	1995
Ofshe, Richard; Ethan Watters	Scientific skepticism	Making Monsters: False Memories, Psychotherapy, and Sexual Hysteria	978-0520205833	University of California Press	1st edition	1996
Hobbes, Thomas	Scientific skepticism	Leviathan	978-0140431957	Penguin Classics	Paperback	1982
Galef, Julia	Critical thinking	The Scout Mindset: Why Some People See Things Clearly and Others Don't	978-0735217560	Portfolio	Hardcover	2021
Gross, Paul; Norman Levitt	Scientific skepticism	Higher Superstition : The Academic Left and Its Quarrels With Science	978-0801857072	Johns Hopkins University Press	Reprint	1997
Ottoboni, Alice	Scientific skepticism	The Dose Makes the Poison: A Plain-Language Guide to Toxicology	978-0471288374	Wiley Publishing	2nd Edition	1997
Sagan, Carl	Scientific skepticism	Cosmos	978-0345539434	Ballantine Books	Paperback	2013
Singh, Simon	Scientific skepticism	Big Bang: The Origin of the Universe	978-0007162215	Harper Perennial	Reprint	2005
Holmes, Richard	Scientific skepticism	The Age of Wonder : How the Romantic Generation Discovered the Beauty and Terror of Science	978-0375422225	Pantheon Books	Hardcover	2009
Radford, Benjamin	Scientific skepticism	Mysterious New Mexico: Miracles, Magic, and Monsters in the Land of Enchantment	978-0826354501	University of New Mexico Press	Paperback	2014
Collins, Loren	Scientific skepticism	Bullspotting: Finding Facts in the Age of Misinformation	978-1616146344	Prometheus Books	Paperback	2012
Dunbar, David; Brad Reagan	Conspiracy theory	Debunking 9/11 Myths: Why Conspiracy Theories Can't Stand Up to the Facts	978-1588165473	Hearst Books	Updated	2011
Bugliosi, Vincent	Conspiracy theory	Reclaiming History: The Assassination of President John F. Kennedy	978-0393045253	W. W. Norton & Company	Hardcover	2007
Dawkins, Richard	Young Skeptics	The Magic of Reality: How We Know What's Really True	978-1451675047	Free Press	Paperback	2012
Chalmers, Alan	Scientific skepticism	What Is This Thing Called Science?	978-1624660382	Hackett Publishing Company	Paperback	2013
Feynman, Richard	Scientific skepticism	What Do You Care What Other People Think?: Further Adventures of a Curious Character	978-0393320923	W. W. Norton & Company	Paperback	2001
Gould, Stephen Jay	Scientific skepticism	An Urchin in the Storm: Essays about Books and Ideas	978-0393305371	W. W. Norton & Company	Paperback	1988
Hoffer, Eric	Scientific skepticism	The True Believer: Thoughts on the Nature of Mass Movements	978-0060505912	Harper Perennial	Paperback	2010
Kurtz, Paul	Scientific skepticism	The Transcendental Temptation: A Critique of Religion and the Paranormal	978-1616148270	Prometheus Books	Paperback	2013
Kuhn, Thomas	Scientific skepticism	The Structure of Scientific Revolutions	978-0226458120	University of Chicago Press	50th Anniversary	2012
Berger, Peter L.; Thomas Luckmann	Scientific skepticism	The Social Construction of Reality: A Treatise in the Sociology of Knowledge	978-0385058988	Random House	Paperback	1967
Sagan, Carl; Ann Druyan	Scientific skepticism	Shadows of Forgotten Ancestors	978-0345384720	Ballantine Books	Paperback	1993
Asimov, Isaac	Scientific skepticism	The Relativity of Wrong	978-1575660080	Kensington Books	Paperback	1995
Dennett, Daniel C.	Creationism	Darwin's Dangerous Idea: Evolution and the Meanings of Life	978-0684824710	Simon & Schuster	Paperback (reprint)	1996
Smith, John Maynard	Creationism	The Theory of Evolution	978-0521451284	Cambridge University Press	Paperback	1993
Krauss, Lawrence M.	Creationism	A Universe from Nothing: Why There Is Something Rather than Nothing	978-1451624465	Atria Books	Paperback	2013
Dawkins, Richard	Creationism	A Devil's Chaplain : Reflections on Hope, Lies, Science, and Love	978-0618485390	Mariner Books	Paperback	2004
Dawkins, Richard	Creationism	Climbing Mount Improbable	978-0393316827	W. W. Norton & Company	Paperback	1997
Dawkins, Richard	Creationism	River Out Of Eden: A Darwinian View of Life	978-0465069903	Basic Books	Paperback	1996
Dawkins, Richard	Creationism	The Extended Phenotype: The Long Reach of the Gene	978-0192880512	Oxford University Press, USA	Paperback (revised)	1999
Dawkins, Richard	Creationism	The Greatest Show on Earth: The Evidence for Evolution	978-1416594789	Free Press	Hardcover	2009
Dawkins, Richard	Creationism	The Selfish Gene	978-0192860927	Oxford University Press, USA	Paperback	1989
Dawkins, Richard	Creationism	Unweaving the Rainbow: Science, Delusion and the Appetite for Wonder	978-0618056736	Mariner Books	Paperback	2000
Carroll, Sean B.	Creationism	Endless Forms Most Beautiful: The New Science of Evo Devo	978-0393060164	W. W. Norton & Company	Hardcover	2005
Gould, Stephen Jay	Creationism	Bully for Brontosaurus	978-0393308570	W. W. Norton & Company	Paperback (reprint)	1992
Gould, Stephen Jay	Creationism	The Flamingo's Smile: Reflections in Natural History	978-0393303759	W. W. Norton & Company	Paperback	1987
Gould, Stephen Jay	Creationism	The Panda's Thumb: More Reflections in Natural History	978-0393308198	W. W. Norton & Company	Paperback	1992
Gould, Stephen Jay	Creationism	The Structure of Evolutionary Theory	978-0674006133	Belknap Press of Harvard University Press	Hardcover	2002
Gould, Stephen Jay	Creationism	Wonderful Life: The Burgess Shale and the Nature of History	978-0393307009	W. W. Norton & Company	Paperback	1990
Gould, Stephen Jay	Creationism	Hen's Teeth and Horse's Toes: Further Reflections in Natural History	978-0393311037	W. W. Norton & Company	Paperback (re-issue)	1994
Weller, Tom	Creationism	Science Made Stupid	978-0395366462	Mariner Books	Paperback	1985
Young, Matt; Taner Edis	Creationism	Why Intelligent Design Fails: A Scientific Critique of the New Creationism	978-0813534336	Rutgers University Press	Hardcover	2004
Forrest, Barbara; Paul R. Gross	Creationism	Creationism's Trojan Horse: The Wedge of Intelligent Design	0195157427	Oxford University Press	Hardcover	2004
Shermer, Michael; Alex Grobman	Conspiracy theory	Denying History: Who Says the Holocaust Never Happened and Why Do They Say It?	0520234693	University of California Press	Updated and Expanded	2002
Ali, Ayaan Hirsi	Scientific skepticism	Infidel	1416586040	Free Press	1st edition	2007
Twain, Mark	Scientific skepticism	Letters from the Earth: Uncensored Writings	0060518650	Perennial Classics	Reprint	2004
Ehrman, Bart D	Religious skepticism	Jesus, Interrupted	0061173932	HarperOne	Hardcover	2009
Miller, Kenneth R.	Scientific skepticism	Finding Darwin's God: A Scientist's Search for Common Ground Between God and Evolution	0061233501	Harper Perennial	Reprint	2007
Dennett, Daniel C.	Religious skepticism	Breaking the Spell: Religion as a Natural Phenomenon	0143038338	Penguin Books	Reprint	2007
Randi, James; Arthur C. Clarke	Scientific skepticism	An Encyclopedia of Claims, Frauds, and Hoaxes of the Occult and Supernatural	0312151195	St. Martin's Griffin	Paperback	1997
Ronson, Jon	Scientific skepticism	The Men Who Stare at Goats	0330507702	Picador	Paperback	2009
Sagan, Carl	Scientific skepticism	The Dragons of Eden: Speculations on the Evolution of Human Intelligence	0345346297	Ballantine Books	Later Printing	1986
Sagan, Carl	Scientific skepticism	Billions and Billions: Thoughts on Life and Death at the Brink of the Millennium	0345379187	Ballantine Books	Paperback	1997
Sagan, Carl	Scientific skepticism	The Demon-Haunted World: Science as a Candle in the Dark	0345409469	Ballantine Books	Paperback	1995
Gould, Stephen Jay	Scientific skepticism	Ever Since Darwin: Reflections in Natural History	0393308189	W. W. Norton & Company	Paperback	1977
Gould, Stephen Jay	Scientific skepticism	The Mismeasure of Man	0393314251	W. W. Norton & Company	Revised & Expanded	1996
Dawkins, Richard	Religious skepticism	The Blind Watchmaker	0393315703	W. W. Norton & Company	later	1986
Feynman, Richard	Scientific skepticism	Surely You’re Joking, Mr. Feynman!: Adventures of a Curious Character	0393316041	W. W. Norton & Company	Paperback	1997
Ernst, Edzard; Simon Singh	Alt med	Trick or Treatment: The Undeniable Facts About Alternative Medicine	0393337782	W. W. Norton & Company	1st	2009
Hofstadter, Richard	Scientific skepticism	Anti-Intellectualism in American Life	0394703170	Vintage Books	Paperback	1966
Hitchens, Christopher	Religious skepticism	God Is Not Great: How Religion Poisons Everything	0446552291	Twelve Books	Paperback	2007
Darwin, Charles; Julian Huxley	Scientific skepticism	The Origin of Species	0451529065	Signet Classics	150th Anniversary	2003
Feynman, Richard	Scientific skepticism	The Meaning of It All: Thoughts of a Citizen-Scientist	0465023940	Basic Books	Paperback	2005
Feynman, Richard; Jeffrey Robbins (ed)	Scientific skepticism	The Pleasure of Finding Things Out: The Best Short Works of Richard P. Feynman	0465023959	Basic Books	Helix Books Series	2005
Hofstadter, Douglas R.	Scientific skepticism	Godel, Escher, Bach: An Eternal Golden Braid	0465026567	Basic Books	20th Anniversary	1999
Carroll, Robert Todd	Scientific skepticism	The Skeptic's Dictionary: A Collection of Strange Beliefs, Amusing Deceptions, & Dangerous Delusions	0471272426	Wiley Publishing	1st	2003
Plait, Philip C.	Scientific skepticism	Bad Astronomy: Misconceptions and Misuses Revealed, from Astrology to the Moon Landing "Hoax"	0471409766	John Wiley & Sons	1st	2002
Gardner, Martin	Scientific skepticism	Fads and Fallacies in the Name of Science	0486203948	Dover Publications	Paperback	1957
Asimov, Isaac	Religious skepticism	Asimov's Guide to the Bible: A Historical Look at the Old and New Testaments	978-0517345825	Wings	Hardcover	1988
Hazlitt, Henry	Scientific skepticism	Economics in One Lesson: The Shortest and Surest Way to Understand Basic Economics	0517548232	Three Rivers Press	Paperback	1988
Hawking, Stephen	Scientific skepticism	A Brief History of Time	0553380168	Bantam Books	Paperback	1988
Dawkins, Richard	Religious skepticism	The God Delusion	0618918248	Mariner Books	Paperback	2006
Kuhn, Thomas S.	Scientific skepticism	The Copernican Revolution: Planetary Astronomy in the Development of Western Thought	0674171039	Harvard University Press	Paperback	1992
Posner, Gerald	Conspiracy theory	Case Closed: Lee Harvey Oswald and the Assassination of JFK	978-1400034628	Anchor Books	Paperback	2003
Dawkins, Richard	Scientific skepticism	The Ancestor’s Tale: A Pilgrimage to the Dawn of Evolution	0739453734	Houghton Mifflin	Paperback	2004
Shermer, Michael	Scientific skepticism	Why Darwin Matters: The Case Against Intelligent Design	0805083065	Holt Paperbacks	Paperback	2007
Paulos John Allen	Scientific skepticism	Innumeracy, Mathematical Illiteracy and its Consequences	0809058405	Hill and Wang	Paperback	2001
Radford, Benjamin	Scientific skepticism	Tracking the Chupacabra: The Vampire Beast in Fact, Fiction, and Folklore	0826350151	University of New Mexico Press	Paperback	2011
Goldacre, Ben	Scientific skepticism	Bad Pharma: How Drug Companies Mislead Doctors and Harm Patients	0865478007	Faber & Faber	1st	2012
Goldacre, Ben	Scientific skepticism	Bad Science: Quacks, Hacks, and Big Pharma Flacks	0865479186	Faber & Faber	1st	2008
Randi, James	Scientific skepticism	Flim-Flam! Psychics, ESP, Unicorns, and Other Delusions	0879751983	Prometheus Books	Paperback	1982
Randi, James	Scientific skepticism	The Truth About Uri Geller	0879751991	Prometheus Books	Paperback	1982
Randi, James	Scientific skepticism	The Faith Healers	0879755350	Prometheus Books	Paperback	1989
Randi, James	Scientific skepticism	The Mask of Nostradamus: The Prophecies of the World's Most Famous Seer	0879758309	Prometheus Books	Paperback	1993
Shermer, Michael	Scientific skepticism	Why People Believe Weird Things: Pseudoscience, Superstition, and Other Confusions of Our Time	978-0805070897	Holt Paperbacks	Paperback	1997
Mehta, Hemant	Religious skepticism	I Sold My Soul on eBay: Viewing Faith Through an Atheist's Eyes	1400073472	Waterbrook Press	Paperback	2007
Hitchens, Christopher	Religious skepticism	The Missionary Position: Mother Teresa in Theory and Practice	1455523003	Twelve (Hachette Book Group USA)	Paperback	2012
Keene, M. Lamar	Scientific skepticism	The Psychic Mafia	1573921610	Prometheus Books UK		1998
Mackay, Charles	Scientific skepticism	Extraordinary Popular Delusions and the Madness of Crowds	1573928917	Prometheus Books	Great Minds Series	2001
Paine, Thomas	Scientific skepticism	The Age of Reason	1603863419	Truth Seeker Company, Available for free on Google Books		1794, 1795, and 1807
Tavris, Carol	Scientific skepticism	Mistakes Were Made (But Not by Me): Why We Justify Foolish Beliefs, Bad Decisions, and Hurtful Acts	978-0156033909	Harvest Books		2007
Offit, Paul A., MD	Scientific skepticism	Autism's False Prophets: Bad Science, Risky Medicine, and the Search For a Cure	978-0231146364	Columbia University Press	1st	2008
Lipstadt, Deborah E.	Conspiracy theory	Denying the Holocaust: The Growing Assault on Truth and Memory	978-0452272743	Plume	Paperback	1994
Edward, Mark	Scientific skepticism	Psychic Blues: Confessions of a Conflicted Medium	978-1936239276	Feral House		2012
Chapman, Matthew	Scientific skepticism	40 Days and 40 Nights: Darwin, Intelligent Design, God, Oxycontin and Other Oddities on Trial in Pennsylvania	978-0061179464	Harper		2007
Lilienfeld, Scott O.; Steven Jay Lynn; John Ruscio; Barry L. Beyerstein	Scientific skepticism	50 Great Myths of Popular Psychology: Shattering Widespread Misconceptions About Human Behavior	1405131128	Wiley-Blackwell		2010
Feder, Kenneth L.	Scientific skepticism	Frauds, Myths, and Mysteries: Science and Pseudoscience in Archaeology	007811697X	McGraw-Hill	Paperback	2002
Hecht, Jennifer	Scientific skepticism	Doubt: A History	0060097957	HarperOne	Paperback	2004
Rawcliffe, Donovan Hilton	Scientific skepticism	The Psychology of the Occult: Illusions and Delusions of the Supernatural and the Occult	978-0548080818	Dover Publications	Hardcover	1959
Harris, Sam	Religious skepticism	Letter to a Christian Nation: A Challenge to Faith	0307265773	Vintage Books	Paperback	2008
Gould, Stephen Jay	Scientific skepticism	Questioning the Millennium: A Rationalist's Guide to a Precisely Arbitrary Countdown	0609605410	Harmony Books	Hardcover – 2nd ed.	1997
Harris, Sam	Religious skepticism	The End of Faith	0743268091	W. W. Norton & Company	Paperback	2004
Stewart, Katherine	Religious skepticism	The Good News Club: The Christian Right’s Stealth Assault on America’s Children	978-1586488437	PublicAffairs	Hardcover	2012
Harris, Sam	Scientific skepticism	The Moral Landscape	978-1439171219	Free Press	Hardcover	2010
Hitchens, Christopher	Religious skepticism	The Portable Atheist: Essential Readings For the Nonbeliever	978-0306816086	Da Capo Press	Paperback	2007
Marks, David F.	Scientific skepticism	The Psychology of the Psychic	978-1573927987	Prometheus Books	Paperback	2000
Diamond, Jared	Scientific skepticism	The Third Chimpanzee: The Evolution and Future of the Human Animal	978-0060845506	Harper Perennial	Paperback	2006
Russell, Bertrand	Religious skepticism	Why I Am Not a Christian and Other Essays on Religion and Related Subjects	978-0671203238	Touchstone	Paperback	1967
Plait, Philip	Scientific skepticism	Death from the Skies!: The Science Behind the End of the World	978-0143116042	Penguin Books	Paperback	2009
Blu Buhs, Joshua	Cryptozoology	Bigfoot: The Life and Times of a Legend	978-0226079806	University of Chicago Press	Paperback	2010
Almossawi, Ali	Logic	An Illustrated Book of Bad Arguments	978-1925106244	Scribe Publications	Hardcover	2014
Washington, Haydn; Cook, John	Scientific skepticism	Climate Change Denial: Heads in the Sand	978-1849713368	Earthscan from Routledge	Hardcover	2011
Descartes, René	Scientific skepticism	Discourse on the Method of Rightly Conducting One's Reason and of Seeking Truth in the Sciences (French title: Discours de la méthode pour bien conduire sa raison, et chercher la vérité dans les sciences)				1637
John O'Connor	Bigfoot	The Secret History of Bigfoot	978-1464216633	Sourcebooks	Hardcover	2024
Ronald Story	Ancient astronauts	The Space Gods Revealed: A Close Look At The Theories of Erich von Däniken	ISBN 0060141417	Harper & Row	Hardcover	1976
David Miles	Virology	Sneeze: The History and Science of the Common Cold	ISBN 979-8217253272	August Books	Hardcover	2026
Jonathan Howard	Public health	We Want Them Infected: How the Failed Quest for Herd Immunity Led Doctors to Embrace the Anti-Vaccine Movement and Blinded Americans to the Threat of Covid	ISBN 978-1959346036	Redhawk Publications	Paperback	2023
Tyson, Neil deGrasse	Extraterrestrial life	Take Me to Your Leader: Perspectives on Your First Alien Encounter	ISBN 978-1668249970	Simon Six	Hardcover	2026
Blooming, Avrum; Tavris, Carol	Medicine	Estrogen Matters: Why Taking Hormones in Menopause Can Improve and Lengthen Women's Lives -- Without Raising the Risk of Breast Cancer	ISBN 978-0316481205	Little, Brown Spark	Hardcover	2024

== See also ==
- List of science books on evolution
- List of skeptical magazines
- List of skeptical podcasts
- Lists about skepticism
