= Lauri Lebo =

Pennsylvania reporter and public figure

- Born: March 18, 1964; Newberrytown, Pennsylvania
- Occupations: Teachers' union spokeswoman, ACLU-PA BOD, Author, journalist
- Notable credit(s): Coverage of Kitzmiller v. Dover; The Devil in Dover; Murder case in 1969 York race riot
- Spouse: Jefferson Pepper
- Awards: NCSE Friend of Darwin Award (2026)
- Website: https://www.facebook.com/lauri.lebo.5

Lauri Lebo (born March 18, 1964) is a spokeswoman for the Pennsylvania State Education Association, Secretary of the ACLU-Pennsylvania Board of Directors, author, former radio station co-owner and disc jockey, and reporter from York County, Pennsylvania. Lebo was the principal local reporter covering Kitzmiller v. Dover in 2004 and 2005, and was featured prominently in the Nova documentary Judgment Day: Intelligent Design on Trial both because of her coverage and because her father, Shiremanstown Mayor Dean Lebo, who co-owned Christian radio station WWII-AM (broadcasting to Harrisburg), sided with the Dover school board in the controversy.

An award-winning journalist for over 20 years. Lebo helped to reopen murder cases from the 1969 York Race Riot, She left reporting to write The Devil in Dover, a book about the trial of the intelligent design movement and its effects on Dover.

== Early life ==
Lauri was the oldest of Dean and Ann Lebo's five children. She attended Sunday school weekly and sang in the church choir. She believed the stories of Adam and Eve, Noah's Ark, and Jesus’ sacrifice. Her mother taught her to enjoy life. Her father taught her about possibilities. As she grew older, she drifted away from the church.

Her father's conversion to the Pentecostal faith began in 1987, when Lauri Lebo was about 23. Her father, who had taught her about the distance of the stars and whom she loved dearly, became “... a fundamentalist, speaking-in-tongues, slain-in-the-spirit, beware-the-mark-of-the-beast, faith-healing Christian...”)

Lebo said her York County male elementary school classmates used to beat her up because of her “big mouth.”

Inspired by her friend's journalist father, Ed Jensen, who included his daughter's friends in his “clever” news-related conversations, Lebo decided to become a journalist.

When she was 15, her family evacuated their home due to the Three Mile Island partial nuclear meltdown just across the Susquehanna River from Newberrytown, less than 5 miles from her home at the time.

== Journalism/Authorship career ==
Ed Jensen stayed in the area to report when Three Mile Island had its partial nuclear meltdown. When Jensen died three years later of cancer, Lebo “understood what it means to be a reporter," and she became one in 1985.

In 2000, her first big story covered the 1969 York, PA race riot. Based on a series of articles for the 30th anniversary of the riots by Lebo and others at the York Daily Record/Sunday news, the York County District Attorney and Deputy Prosecutor each reopened investigations.

=== Journalism related to the Dover trial ===
In 2004, the York Daily Record assigned their Education Reporter, the then-Christian Lebo, to cover Kitzmiller v. Dover, which she called “the most amazing story I've ever covered in my life.”

Lebo sat through every day of testimony. “As a reporter who doesn't come from a scientific background,” she was amazed daily that she was getting paid to “learn about evolution and the scientific method.” The plaintiffs presented “The biology class you wish you could have taken”, as Lebo quoted Margaret Talbot. “Every day we’d... learn something else incredible about... the fossil record, about the Avida program, which is a software program that actually shows evolution.” Lebo had thought she could see the “hand of the Divine” when Intelligent Design was first described to her. She had been looking forward to hearing scientific arguments for the Christian god. Instead, she heard the primary scientist for the defense, biochemist Michael Behe, admit that astrology is as much a science as Intelligent Design is.

During her December 2015 interview with Freedom From Religion’s Freethought Radio podcast, Lebo compared the pressure that Dover teachers felt to teach Creationism in biology class on the one hand, to the pressure she received from her employer to "write something nice" about Creationism on the other. Although it relented after several months, the York Daily Record threatened Lebo with dismissal if she spoke at “Evolution 2006”, put on by the Stonybrook University Department of Ecology and Evolution. The York Daily Record also strongly opposed Lebo's request for time off to write her book on the Kitzmiller v. Dover trial, claiming this would offend their conservative Christian readers. So Lebo quit her job as reporter and wrote The Devil in Dover.

Afterwards, Lebo became a reporter for Religion Dispatches, from which she announced, on 2011-07-10, her retirement to join the Pennsylvania State Education Association.

Lebo was one of three panel judges for the 2016 Heywood Broun (journalism) Award. In October 2016, Lebo was given the Freedom From Religion Foundation's Freethought Heroine Award in recognition of the special contributions of women to freethought and the battle to keep state and church separate.

=== Journalism philosophy ===
Since the Dover trial, Ms. Lebo has subscribed to Walter Williams’ Journalist’s Creed, the words of which “remain one of the strongest summations of the guiding principles of our craft” and the Walter Lippman philosophy of “objectivity of method”, rather than the pretense that journalists have no opinions. “If one side is a lie” and the reporter treats it as equal to the other side, that reporter performs a disservice. She also asserted that media consolidation threatens a journalist's “depth and breadth of knowledge (of her/his sources and community) and does a disservice to democracy.”

=== Journalism awards ===
- Freedom From Religion 39th National Convention 2016 Freethought Heroine
- Studs and Ida Terkel Fund prizewinner for The Devil in Dover (Initial prizewinner)
- 27th Annual Schnaeder Print Media Awards (2006) 1st Place Beat Coverage: Daily Newspapers Under 49,000 Circ. for her coverage of intelligent design
- To the York Daily Record and York Dispatch/Sunday News (Lebo reported for both, including articles on the York race riots) National Journalism Award for Public Service Reporting - Under 100,000 circulation for coverage of the York race riot.

=== Selected articles ===
- Religion Dispatch articles, 15 pages of links
- The Scopes Strategy: Creationists Try New Tactics to Promote Anti-Evolutionary Teaching in Public Schools
- Unregulated Capitalism and Christian Fervor
- No News Is Bad News
- ‘Academic Freedom’ is Creationism
- Intelligent Design Propaganda Is Coming to a Theater Near You
- Was Guillermo Gonzalez “Expelled”? Intelligent Design and Tenure at Iowa State University

== Current career / Activism ==
Lauri Lebo has served as the Southern Region Advocacy Coordinator for the Pennsylvania State Education Association, a chapter of the National Education Association. She has also served as a spokeswoman.

Lebo is also the Secretary for the ACLU-PA Board of Directors. She won the ACLU-PA 2012 Best published letter to the editor on a civil liberties-related issue (voter ID).

Lebo is a scheduled speaker at the Freedom From Religion Foundation's 39th Annual Convention.
