= NCSE =

NCSE may refer to:

== Education ==
- National Center for Science Education, United States, promotes the teaching of evolutionary biology and climate science
- National Council for Special Education, Ireland, supports students with disabilities
- National Certificate of Secondary Education, Trinidad and Tobago, a school qualification

== Other ==
- Cognistat, formerly known as the Neurobehavioral Cognitive Status Examination (NCSE), a cognitive screening test
- National Council for Science and the Environment, United States, a business-research alliance for environmental policy
- Selenocyanate ion NCSe^{−}
