= Why Intelligent Design Fails =

2004 book by Matt Young and Taner Edis

Why Intelligent Design Fails: A Scientific Critique of the New Creationism
- Author: Matt Young and Taner Edis
- Language: English
- Subject: Intelligent design
- Genre: Non-fiction
- Publisher: Rutgers University Press
- Publication date: June 25, 2004
- Publication place: United States
- Media type: Print (Hardcover)
- Pages: 238
- ISBN: 081353433X
- OCLC: 53038740
- LC Class: BL240.3

Why Intelligent Design Fails: A Scientific Critique of the New Creationism is a 2004 anthology edited by physicists Matt Young and Taner Edis. It was published on June 25 by Rutgers University Press.

== Contents ==
According to the publisher, "Why Intelligent Design Fails assembles a team of physicists, biologists, computer scientists, mathematicians, and archaeologists to examine intelligent design from a scientific perspective. Contributors take intelligent design's two most famous claims - irreducible complexity and information-based arguments - and show that neither challenges Darwinian evolution."

== Reception ==
Massimo Pigliucci said in Evolution that the book is a "good extended treatment" of the subject and that "[a]ll in all, the [book] ought to be a vade mecum [guidebook] for graduate students and colleagues who are serious about understanding ID...."

Arthur Falk, of Western Michigan University, said, "Not only is the books largely successful, but several articles provide interesting updates of evolution science for nonprofessionals, quite apart from this debate.... Teachers of science, even at the high school level, will enjoy using Gishlick's do-it-yourself demonstration of the mechanics of flight, starting with an uncooked chicken.... I found myself skeptical of the two articles that deal with the creationists' exploitation of physics -- in particular, the Second Law of Thermodynamics and the problem of the "fine tuning" of physical constants."

Mike Holderness noted in New Scientist, "Each of the 13 chapters of Why Intelligent Design Fails is a patient and clear specialist rebuttal of [relevant claims], in fields from molecular biology to the philosophy of science. It is an essential tool for anyone inclined to resist the wedge."
