= Monkey Girl =

2007 non-fiction book

Monkey Girl: Evolution, Education, Religion, and the Battle for America's Soul
- Author: Edward Humes
- Publisher: Ecco (HarperCollins)
- Publication date: 2007
- Publication place: United States

Monkey Girl: Evolution, Education, Religion, and the Battle for America's Soul is a 2007 non-fiction book about the Kitzmiller v. Dover Area School District trial of 2005. Author Edward Humes, a Pulitzer Prize-winning American journalist, interviewed interested parties to the controversy around a school board's decision to introduce the concept of intelligent design into public school lessons on science. The book describes in detail the experiences of those caught up in the actions of the school board and the ensuing Dover trial, in the context of the intelligent design movement and the ascendency of the American religious right whose opposition to evolution led them to campaign to redefine science to accept supernatural explanations of natural phenomena.
