= Selman v. Cobb County School District =

2004 United States court case

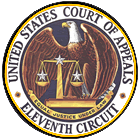
- Court: United States Court of Appeals for the Eleventh Circuit
- Decided: May 25, 2006
- Citation: 449 F.3d 1320

Case history
- Prior history: 390 F. Supp. 2d 1286 (N.D. Ga. 2005) (reversed and remanded)

Court membership
- Judges sitting: Edward Earl Carnes, Frank M. Hull, William H. Pryor, Jr.

Case opinions
- Majority: Carnes

Selman v. Cobb County School District, 449 F.3d 1320 (11th Cir. 2006), was a United States court case in Cobb County, Georgia involving a sticker placed in public school biology textbooks. The sticker was a disclaimer stating that "Evolution is a theory, not a fact, concerning the origin of living things." The plaintiffs were parents of children in Cobb County schools who claimed the sticker violated both the Establishment Clause of the United States Constitution and the separation of church and state clause in the Georgia State Constitution because its purpose and effect was to cast doubt on the scientific consensus regarding evolutionary theory in order to promote religious beliefs in the schools.

Trial was held in November 2004. In January 2005, Federal District Judge Clarence Cooper decided in favor of the plaintiffs and against the Cobb County School District, finding the stickers violated both the U.S. and Georgia constitutions. He ordered a permanent injunction against schools from disseminating the stickers in the textbooks or any other form. The decision was appealed in the 11th Circuit Court of Appeals which found that they could not assess the lower court case due to gaps and rampant confusion about the evidence apparent in the case record, thus preventing proper appellate review of the constitutional issues. The original decision, in May 2006, was remanded back to the lower district court for new evidentiary inquiry and factfindings. The case was ultimately settled out of court in favor of the plaintiffs.

== Background ==
The statement "evolution is a theory and not a fact" has been used as a tactic by creationists and intelligent design advocates, causing confusion over the difference between how theory is defined and used in the field of science and how the term is used colloquially to signify "conjecture", "speculation" or "opinion". The teaching of both creationism and intelligent design in state schools in the USA have been challenged in court and found to be a violation of the Establishment Clause (notably Edwards v. Aguillard, Kitzmiller v. Dover Area School District). Those cases followed an earlier constitutional court ruling against religiously based bans against the teaching of evolution (Epperson v. Arkansas). In 1997 a school policy adopted in Louisiana requiring the reading of a prepared statement before any teaching of evolution was also judged as unconstitutional (Freiler v. Tangipahoa).

Beginning in 1976 the Cobb County School District had policies in place requiring that their instructional program consider and accommodate for religious objections held by many of its residents to the science of human evolution. By 1995 the policy was expanded to list five requirements:

1. Curriculum must be organized such that no student is compelled to study the origin of the human species in science
2. No scientific study in the origin of the human species may be taught at the elementary or middle school level
3. There may be no course requirement for the origin of the human species in science for high school graduation
4. Elective course work must be available to students to investigate alternatives to the origin of the human species in science, including creationism
5. These electives must be identified in course selection guides provided to students and parents

This policy did not explicitly refer to the teaching of evolution by name—only the origin of the human species. Although Georgia state law mandated evolution be taught in its public schools, it was common in Cobb County School District that all the pages where evolution was discussed were removed from the students' science textbooks.

In 2001, the Cobb County School District began the process of adopting new science textbooks. The adoption process led to a legal review, and later revision, of the previous policy and regulation on theories of human origin. When parents became aware that the proposed new textbook (written by Kenneth Miller and Joseph Levine) and proposed changes to policy would strengthen the teaching of evolution, a petition against the move was organized and signed by 2,300 parents. In an attempt to defuse this protest, the decision was made to attach a sticker containing a statement written by the school district's legal counsel to each new textbook. The sticker read,

This textbook contains material on evolution. Evolution is a theory, not a fact, regarding the origin of living things. This material should be approached with an open mind, studied carefully, and critically considered.

Approved by
Cobb County Board of Education

Thursday, March 28, 2002

The school board also adopted policy changes emphasizing its aim to "foster critical thinking among the students, to allow academic freedom consistent with legal requirements, to promote tolerance and acceptance of diversity of opinion, and to ensure a posture of neutrality to religion." It was not its intention, the policy continued, to restrict the teaching of evolution, nor to promote creationism.

The textbook and policy changes had become a public event, but despite engendering much input from parents and other concerned citizens in the community, no attempt was made to solicit expert scientific opinion in coming to a decision. Intelligent design activists from the Discovery Institute sent school board members written materials and an offer of assistance in drafting the language to put in the sticker, although no evidence was ever shown officials accepted this offer. Following adoption of the sticker, organizations, churches, academics and others from around the country contacted school officials congratulating them for opening the classroom to "the teaching and discussion of creationism and intelligent design".

Parent Jeffrey Selman brought action against the school district for imposing the sticker on August 21, 2002, before any revisions to the 1995 policy were adopted. The plaintiff claimed the sticker unduly restricted the teaching of evolution by imposing separate standards from all other scientific theories. He also claimed the effective result was to advance creationism.

Changes were made to the 1995 policy shortly after and again in 2003 with new provisions stating evolution would be taught in science classes and not religion. Four other parents were added as plaintiffs in January 2004.

== Jeffrey Selman ==
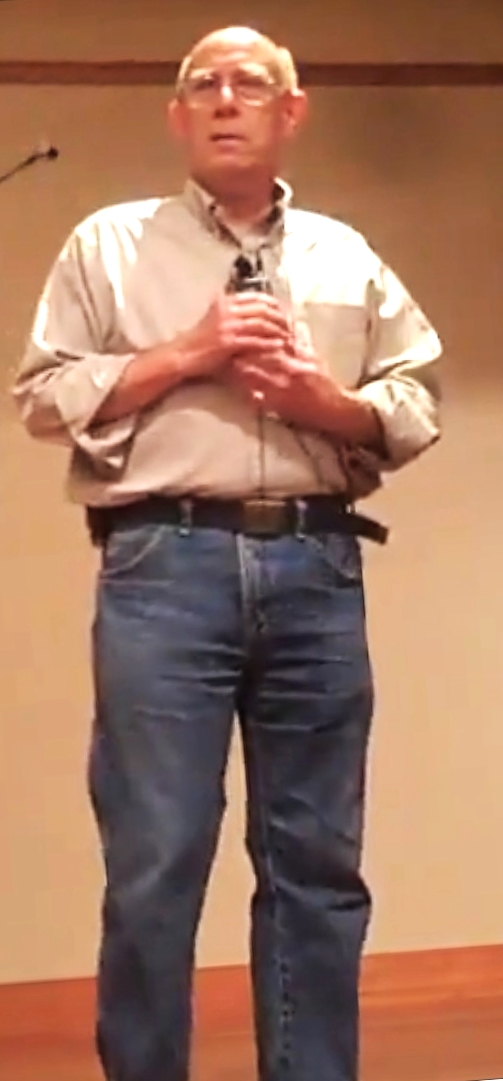
Selman speaks in 2018

Jeffrey Selman was born in 1946 and raised in the Bronx, New York. He was strongly influenced by the civil rights era in the 1960s. After receiving a BA in history he joined VISTA which later became AmeriCorps. He became a school teacher in the South Bronx, then later a COBOL programmer and traveled until he met his wife in Atlanta and finally settled in Cobb County where he resides as of 2015. Selman served on the Georgia State Public School curriculum committee in 1996. He read an article in the Atlanta weekly alternative paper, Creative Loafing, about anti-evolution stickers in the new science textbooks in Cobb Public Schools, and first contacted the school board about his concerns. After feeling ignored by the school board, Selman contacted the ACLU. At the time his daughter was attending elementary school in the Cobb school system. After the trial he became the President of the Americans United for Separation of Church and State for Atlanta.

Selman states that he was very upset when he read about what the Cobb County school board had done with the warning stickers on the science textbooks. He told interviewer Josh Zepps on Center for Inquiry's Point of Inquiry podcast that he felt strongly that in science class you are supposed to teach the science, "Whether or not you believe in it or understand it, is irrelevant. That's the topic so you should be taught the topic. ... You aren't going to teach French in a Russian class, the kids are there to learn Russian, not French. [These science teachers,] they were defining a definition that evolution was a theory and not a fact, and that is outside even the meaning in a science class."

A few years before Selman became aware of the warning stickers, he learned that the Cobb County School board, upon pressure from creationist parents, had contacted the school's textbook publisher regarding concerns of teaching elementary school students about evolution and the Big Bang. The publisher responded by blanking out the pages of their textbook that had chapters concerning these subjects. The publisher left the page numbers on these blank pages, and the index and table of contents still listed evolution and the Big Bang, but the pages concerned were blank.

In 2015, Selman self-published God Sent Me, an autobiographical account of the case. He states, "I did not write the book for money... I got nothing out of it, its been ten years since the case happened. This is about spreading the word for people to have courage enough to stand up, as citizens to protect all of our rights... I'm not against religion, believe what you want to... I'm here to keep the government out of your religion... we are supposed to be a free country."

== Original decision ==
In the trial held to determine whether the sticker applied to the science textbooks was unconstitutional, the court examined the facts of the case against the three-prong test set forth in Lemon v. Kurtzman. Under the Lemon test, as it is commonly referred, a government-sponsored message violates the Establishment Clause if it fails any of the following:

1. The action must have a legitimate secular purpose;
2. The action must not have the primary effect of either advancing or inhibiting religion; and
3. The action must not result in an "excessive entanglement" of the government and religion.

In the resulting court decision the judge found that the action taken in Cobb County School District met the legal standard established in the first prong:

the court found that the School Board sought to advance two secular purposes... ...to encourage students to engage in critical thinking... [and] ...to reduce offense to those students and parents whose personal beliefs might conflict with teaching on evolution.

The judge merged the second and third prongs of the Lemon test to judge the actions taken by the school district under a single "effect" prong, and here judged those actions as failing to meet the standard set:

[T]he effects prong asks whether the statement at issue in fact conveys a message of endorsement or disapproval of religion to an informed, reasonable observer...In this case, the Court believes that an informed, reasonable observer would interpret the Sticker to convey a message of endorsement of religion. That is, the Sticker sends a message to those who oppose evolution for religious reasons that they are favored members of the political community, while the Sticker sends a message to those who believe in evolution that they are political outsiders. This is particularly so in a case such as this one involving impressionable public school students who are likely to view the message on the Sticker as a union of church and state.

In support of this conclusion, the judge writes:

The critical language ... is the statement that "[e]volution is a theory, not a fact, concerning the origin of living things." This statement is not problematic because of its truth or falsity, although testimony from various witnesses at trial and the amicus brief submitted ... suggest that the statement is not entirely accurate. Rather, the first problem with this language is that there has been a lengthy debate between advocates of evolution and proponents of religious theories of origin specifically concerning whether evolution should be taught as a fact or as a theory, and the School Board appears to have sided with the proponents of religious theories of origin in violation of the Establishment Clause.

The judge entered a permanent injunction against the sticker and ordered it removed from the textbooks. The school district motioned for a stay pending an appeal but were denied, and the stickers were removed.

== Appeal and retrial ==
On May 25, 2006 the United States Court of Appeals for the Eleventh Circuit vacated the judgment and remanded the case back to the trial court to resolve gaps in the evidence record, most notably evidence regarding the communications delivered to school officials prior to the district's adoption of the textbook sticker. The court agreed to a new trial. The plaintiffs utilized the same attorneys, Eric Rothschild and Richard Katskee of Pepper Hamilton, who had prevailed in Kitzmiller v. Dover Area School District in 2005.

== Settlement out of court ==
On December 19, 2006, Americans United for Separation of Church and State announced that the case had been settled out of court in favor of the plaintiffs. Cobb County school officials will not order the placement of "any stickers, labels, stamps, inscriptions, or other warnings or disclaimers bearing language substantially similar to that used on the sticker that is the subject of this action" and would not undermine science education in the future. The decision was hailed by the National Center for Science Education and the American Civil Liberties Union.

The website Answers in Genesis responded, "It's definitely a victory for humanism and censorship, but it is not a victory for science or for parents or their children who are being told they cannot question or challenge evolution in the classroom.". The Discovery Institute issued an official opinion that an "incompetent defense by Cobb County attorney may have caused [the] school district loss."
