= The Psychology of the Occult =

1952 book by psychologist D. H. Rawcliffe

Occult psychology or Psychology of Occult
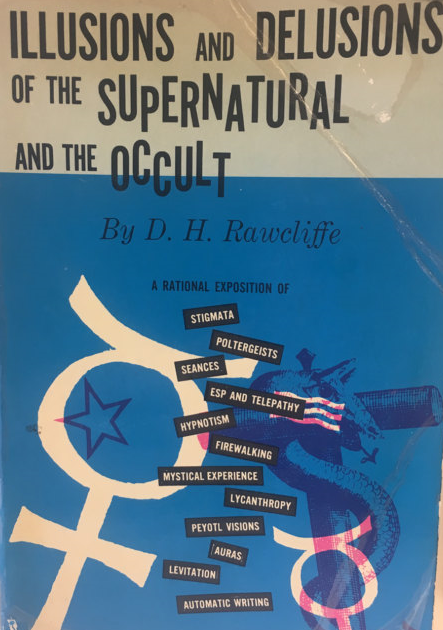
- Cover of Illusions and Delusions of the Supernatural and the Occult, 1959.
- Author: Donovan Hilton Rawcliffe
- Subject: Occult, psychology
- Publisher: London: Ridgway / New York: Dover Publications
- Publication date: 1952, 1959, 1988
- Media type: psychology

The Psychology of the Occult is a 1952 skeptical book on the paranormal by psychologist D. H. Rawcliffe. It was later published as Illusions and Delusions of the Supernatural and the Occult (1959) and Occult and Supernatural Phenomena (1988) by Dover Publications. Biologist Julian Huxley wrote a foreword to the book.

== Content ==
The book takes influence from the works of Frank Podmore, Joseph Jastrow and Ivor Lloyd Tuckett dealing with the "fallacies underlying psychical research". Rawcliffe critically examines claims of the occult, parapsychology and spiritualism concluding that they are best explained by psychological factors such as hallucination, hysteria, neurosis and suggestion as well as "delusion, fraud, prestidigitation, and limitless credulity." Rawcliffe found possible naturalistic explanations for all parapsychological experiments he investigated, noting that there is no scientific evidence for any paranormal power. He suggested that many of the results from ESP experiments can be explained by what he termed endophasic enneurosis (unconscious whispering).

The book offers rational explanations for diverse phenomena such as automatic writing, dowsing, fire-walking, lycanthropy and stigmata.

== Reception ==
Daniel Loxton has described the book as an important skeptical work written many years before the founding of CSICOP. He noted that "Much as Michael Shermer has done in recent decades, Rawcliffe attempted not merely to debunk these claims, but to explain the underlying psychology of why people believe weird things."

== See also ==
- Why People Believe Weird Things
