= Alan Chalmers =

British-Australian philosopher of science (born 1939)

Alan Chalmers FAHA
- Born: Alan Francis Chalmers; 1939 (age 86–87); Bristol, England

Education
- Education: University of Bristol (BSc); University of Manchester (MSc); University of London (PhD)
- Doctoral advisor: Heinz Post

Philosophical work
- Era: Contemporary philosophy
- Region: Western philosophy
- School: Analytic
- Institutions: University of Sydney
- Main interests: Philosophy of science
- Notable works: What Is This Thing Called Science?

Alan Francis Chalmers (/ˈtʃælmərz/; born 1939) is a British-Australian philosopher of science and associate professor at the University of Sydney.

== Education ==
Chalmers was born in Bristol, England in 1939, and was awarded a Bachelor of Science degree in Physics at the University of Bristol in 1961, and his Master of Science in physics from the University of Manchester in 1964. His PhD on the electromagnetic theory of James Clerk Maxwell was awarded by the University of London in 1971.

== Career ==
Chalmers went to Australia as a postdoctoral fellow in 1971. He was a member of the Department of General Philosophy from 1972 to 1986, and from 1986 to 1999 was the head of the Department of the History and Philosophy of Science at the University of Sydney, where he remains an honorary associate professor. Since 1999 Chalmers has been a visiting scholar at the Flinders University Philosophy Department.

Chalmers was elected a fellow of the Australian Academy of the Humanities in 1997. He was awarded the Centenary Medal by the Australian government for ‘Services to the Humanities in the area of History and Philosophy of Science’. From 1999 to 2010, Alan Chalmers became a visiting scholar in the Department of Philosophy at Flinders University, and was also a visiting fellow in the Center of Philosophy of Science at the University of Pittsburgh from 2003 to 2004.

His primary research interest is the philosophy of science and he is author of the best-selling textbook What Is This Thing Called Science? which has been translated into many languages.

== Publications ==
- Science and Its Fabrication
- What Is This Thing Called Science?
- The Scientist's Atom and the Philosopher's Stone: How Science Succeeded and Philosophy Failed to Gain Knowledge of Atoms
- One Hundred Years of Pressure: Hydrostatics from Stevin to Newton
