= Take Me to Your Leader (book) =

2026 book by Neil deGrasse Tyson

Take Me to Your Leader: Perspectives on Your First Alien Encounter
- Author: Neil deGrasse Tyson
- Language: English
- Subject: Extraterrestrial life
- Genre: Non-fiction
- Publisher: Simon Six
- Publication date: May 12, 2026
- Publication place: United States
- Media type: Print (Hardcover)
- Pages: 226
- ISBN: 978-1668249970
- Dewey Decimal: 576.839

Take Me to Your Leader: Perspectives on Your First Alien Encounter is a 2026 popular science book by Neil deGrasse Tyson, Focusing on the potential nature of extraterrestrial life. Published on May 12, 2026, by Simon Six, an imprint of Simon & Schuster.

== Contents ==
According to the publisher, "Take Me to Your Leader is the culmination of a lifetime of fascination, speculation, and the amassing of scientific data about the possibility of Aliens visiting Earth. Drawing on ... history, literature, pop culture, and film, Tyson applies the universal laws of physics to make the case for what Aliens might look like, act like, how they might travel through the universe to reach us, and what they might think of us upon arrival".

== Reception ==
Terence Hines said in Skeptical Inquirer, "Reading the book makes it clear that Tyson has not stepped away from his skeptical position in any way, shape, or form.... It’s an easy read, but it is not a heavy, referenced, academic treatise on UFOs and related topics. This lighter tone may have prompted some people’s dissatisfaction. It will be an excellent introduction to the skeptical approach to flying saucers and aliens for readers starting their skeptical journey."

The New York Times indicated that Tyson "almost entirely ignores an art form that isn’t constrained by practical considerations — the dazzlingly inventive world of science fiction novels and short stories" and that "[he] skates quickly past the concepts that he introduces, as if reluctant to challenge the reader for even a second."

Kirkus Reviews noted that "[Tyson's] imaginings of the strangeness of alien life have the dizzying effect of making us look back at life on Earth through a kind of alien lens, through which our own bodies, customs, and concerns seem strange in their own right, right down to our obsession with aliens, conspiracy theories, and UFOs, all of which say more about us than them—about our yearning for something bigger, our curiosity about the cosmos, our questionable understanding of physics, and our front-facing eyes that so easily, and so wondrously, look up."
