= What Is This Thing Called Science? =

Book by Alan Chalmers

- Author: Alan Chalmers
- Language: English
- Subject: Philosophy of science
- Published: 1976
- Publisher: University of Queensland Press
- Media type: Print

What Is This Thing Called Science? (1976) is a best-selling textbook by Alan Chalmers.

== Overview ==
The book is a guide to the philosophy of science which outlines the shortcomings of naive empiricist accounts of science, and describes and assesses modern attempts to replace them. The book is written with minimal use of technical terms. What Is This Thing Called Science? was first published in 1976, and has been translated into many languages.

== Editions ==
- What Is This Thing Called Science?, Queensland University Press and Open University Press, 1976, pp. 157 + xvii. (Translated into German, Dutch, Italian, Spanish and Chinese.)
- What Is This Thing Called Science?, Queensland University Press, Open University Press and Hackett, 2nd revised edition (6 new chapters), 1982, pp. 179 + xix. (Translated into German, Persian, French, Italian, Spanish, Dutch, Chinese, Japanese, Indonesian, Portuguese, Polish and Danish, Greek and Estonian.)
- What Is This Thing Called Science?, University of Queensland Press, Open University press, 3rd revised edition, Hackett, 1999. (Translated into Korean.)
- What Is This Thing Called Science?, University of Queensland Press, Open University press, 4th edition, 2013.

== See also ==
- The Logic of Scientific Discovery by Karl Popper
- The Structure of Scientific Revolutions by Thomas Kuhn
