= Bullspotting =

- Cover of the First edition
- Author: Loren Collins
- Language: English
- Genre: Non-fiction / Scientific Skepticism
- Publisher: Prometheus Books
- Publication date: 2012
- Publication place: United States
- Media type: Print
- Pages: 276

Bullspotting: Finding Facts in the Age of Misinformation is a book by Georgia attorney Loren Collins. The book discusses the trends and psychology of conspiracy theorists as well as the conspiracies themselves, and the harm they cause. Several of the conspiracy theories mentioned originate from the 9/11 Truth movement, whose proponents believe that the terrorist attacks on the 11th of September 2001 were an inside job executed by the American government, and from young-earth creationists, whose proponents hold that scientists are hiding information which would disprove evolution.

== Inspiration ==
Collins was inspired to write the book after being involved in the birther movement, whose proponents claim that American president Barack Obama was born outside of the US, and is therefore ineligible to be president of the United States of America. Collins worked to debunk many of the claims of the Birther movement, believing that people should focus on policy issues and not uninformed trivia.

== Reception ==
The book was generally well received. Paula Cerni stated that "while Collins’ arguments are often banal and many of his examples silly, his underlying message is spot-on. When he finally asks 'What’s the harm?' he rightly warns that uncritical thinking carries a high cost. Injury to people’s health can follow from dubious faith-based or alternative practices. Economic scams—new-age and old-age—exploit the gullible and uneducated. Most tragically, the failure to engage our critical powers wastes precious time and resources needed to fix our personal and collective lives."

Stephen Law, author of Believing Bullshit said "This highly readable and entertaining book is full of wonderful examples of BS. It also provides a very useful compendium of the warning signs of BS. We all need to build some immunity to BS — especially youngsters. This book is a good place to start."
