= God Sent Me =

Autobiography of Jeffrey Selman, American activist

God Sent Me: A Textbook Case on Evolution vs. Creation
- Subject: Separation of church and state in the United States
- Publisher: Blossom Press (self-published)
- Publication date: May 15, 2015
- Pages: 288
- ISBN: 978-0578152554

God Sent Me: A Textbook Case on Evolution vs. Creation is an autobiographical book by the lead plaintiff in the U.S. Federal Court case Selman v. Cobb County. The book was self-published May 15, 2015 and details Selman's involvement in the court case resulting from the Cobb County School Board's 2002 decision to affix warning stickers against evolution on the schools' new science textbooks. The trial occurred in November 2004 and the Cobb County school board settled in Selman's favor in December 2006.

== Author biography ==
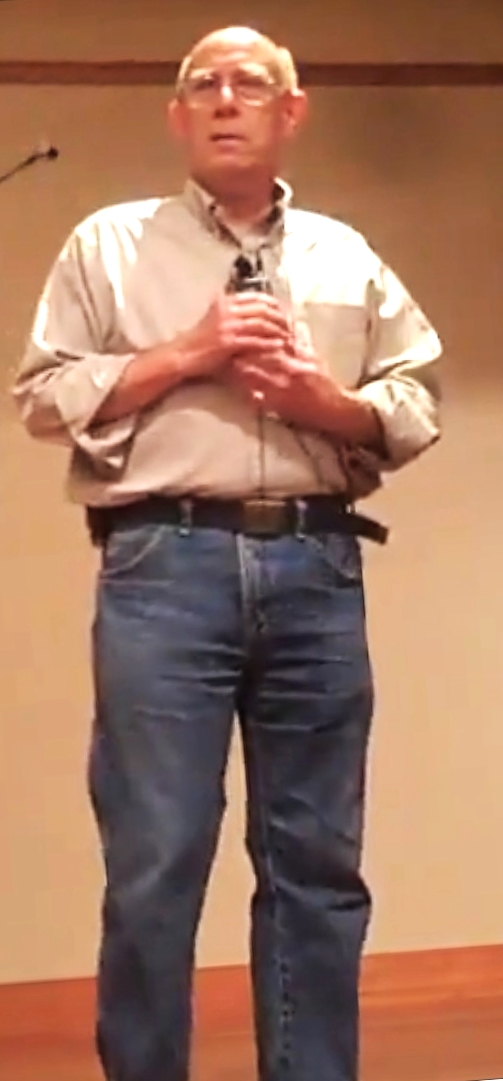
Selman speaks in 2018

Jeffrey Selman was born in 1946 and raised in the Bronx, New York. He was highly influenced by the civil rights era in the 1960s. After receiving a BA in history he joined VISTA which later became AmeriCorps. He became a school teacher in the South Bronx, then later a COBOL programmer and traveled until he met his wife in Atlanta, Georgia, and finally settled in Cobb County where he resides as of 2015.

Selman served on the Georgia State Public School curriculum committee in 1996. He read an article in the Atlanta weekly alternative paper, Creative Loafing, about anti-evolution stickers in the new science textbooks in Cobb Public Schools, and first contacted the school board about his concerns. After feeling ignored by the school board, Selman contacted the ACLU. At the time his son was attending elementary school in the Cobb school system. After the trial he became the President of the Americans United for Separation of Church and State for Atlanta.

== Author interview ==
Selman states that he was very upset when he read about what the Cobb County school board had done with the warning stickers on the science textbooks:

This textbook contains material on evolution. Evolution is a theory, not a fact regarding the origin of living things. This material should be approached with an open mind, studied carefully, critically considered.

— approved by Cobb County Board of Education Thursday, March 28, 2002,

He told interviewer Josh Zepps on Center for Inquiry's Point of Inquiry podcast that he felt strongly that in science class you are supposed to teach the science, "Whether or not you believe in it or understand it, is irrelevant. That's the topic so you should be taught the topic. ... You aren't going to teach French in a Russian class, the kids are there to learn Russian, not French. [The school board members] were defining a definition that evolution was a theory and not a fact, and that is outside even the meaning in a science class."

A few years before Selman became aware of the warning stickers, he learned that the Cobb County School board, upon pressure from creationist parents, had contacted the school's textbook publisher regarding concerns of teaching elementary school students about evolution and the Big Bang. The publisher responded by blanking out the pages of their textbook that had chapters concerning these subjects. The publisher left the page numbers on these blank pages, and the index and table of contents still listed evolution and the Big Bang, but the pages concerned were blank.

One of the reasons Selman states for writing this book is because "you keep banging your head against the wall, eventually a door will open, sure enough... you just can't give up on things." Selman received death threats throughout the case and afterwards, which he calls "very unnerving" he stated his confusion with the question "What ever happened to the commandment, 'Do Not Kill' ... these people don't follow their own tenets."

I did not write the book for money... I got nothing out of it, it's been ten years since the case happened. This is about spreading the word for people to have courage enough to stand up, as citizens, to protect all of our rights... I'm not against religion, believe what you want to... I'm here to keep the government out of your religion... we are supposed to be a free country.

— Jeffrey Selman

== Reactions ==
According to the American Freethought Podcast, the book talks about how the case was started and how long everything took. They considered the book to be very "readable" with "great narration" and jokingly stated that it was "fantastic for a COBOL programmer". Reviewing the book in Skeptical Inquirer magazine, Glenn Branch felt that the book's account of the pre-trial was "especially interesting" as the media did not cover that aspect as much, the book reveals a lot about the first settlement offer as well as Selman's deposition using transcripts, and also the involvement of the expert witnesses. Branch would have liked to have seen more credit given to the role that Kitzmiller v. Dover had on forcing the school board to settle. According to Branch the book is missing several explanations that would have helped explain the story further. Selman stated that he originally wrote enough for two books, but was advised to cut it back to the content he eventually published. Branch said that the book would have profited by a "firm editorial hand" to clean up the prose and references. He also states that not having a bibliography and index was "mildly frustrating". Branch mentioned that Selman's writing style is "engaging" and states that the use of Yiddish phrases throughout the book will delight some readers.

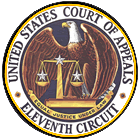
US Court of Appeals Seal

== Publishing history ==
After talking to publisher friends, Selman decided to self-publish God Sent Me. He used CreateSpace on Amazon.com. Originally the book was going to be about the Cobb School Board and the Cobb County Christian dominant prayer cases, but it was too large. His editor told him to cut out the second case and turn it into two books. Selman says that he is happy to speak about the book in interviews, but that he is not writing another book.

== Other ==
Selman advises that people need to take a stand when they see something wrong like this. He now understands that people can remain anonymous while making objections. The courts need to know a plaintiff's name and check for standing, but that name does not have to become public if the plaintiff does not want it to. Also, when contacting a group like the ACLU, a person with concerns may have to be persistent; they are very busy, they will get back to you, but nothing will happen quickly. Selman has contacted many bookstores attempting to arrange book signings; he is comfortable doing speaking engagements. He states his goal is to get the word out.

== See also ==
- National Center for Science Education
- National Science Teachers Association
