= Carol Tavris =

American psychologist (born 1944)

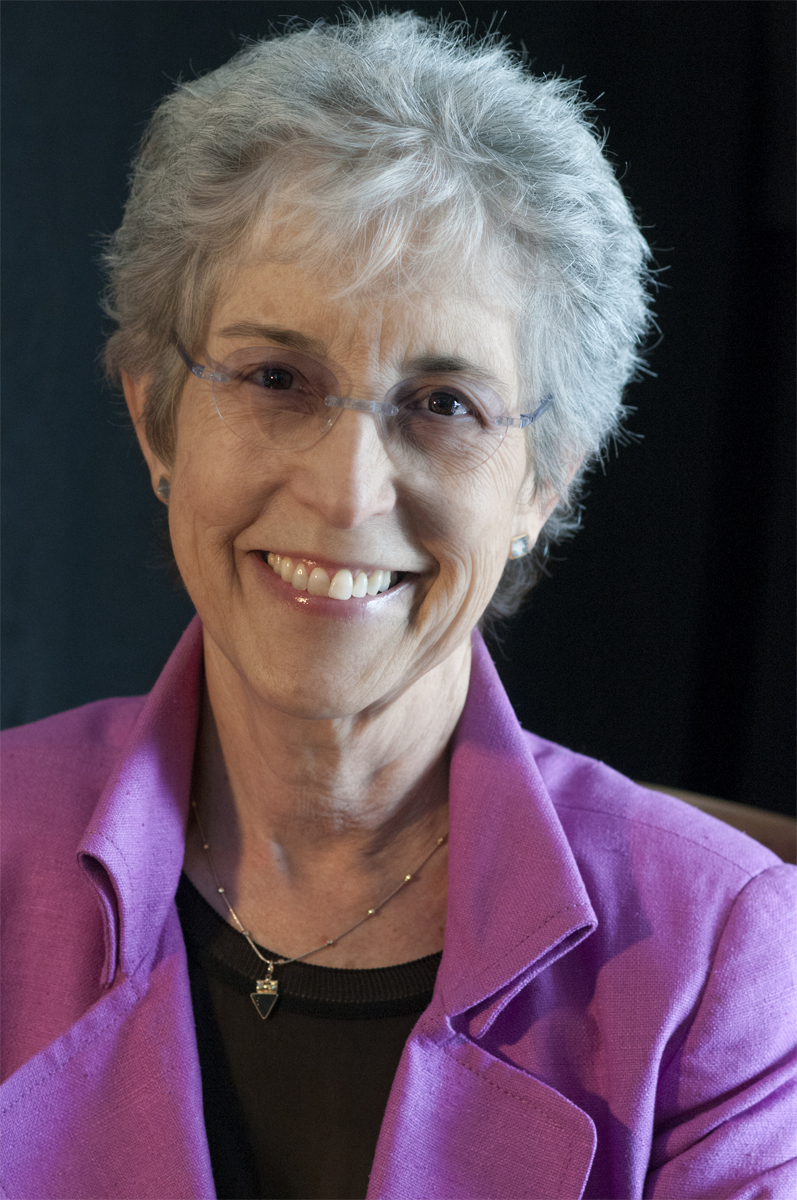
- Carol Tavris in 2013
- Born: September 17, 1944 (age 82); Los Angeles, California, U.S.
- Education: B.A., Brandeis University; Ph.D., University of Michigan
- Scientific career
- Fields: Social Psychology

Carol Anne Tavris (born September 17, 1944) is an American social psychologist and feminist. She has devoted her career to writing and lecturing about the contributions of psychological science to the beliefs and practices that guide people's lives, and to criticizing "psychobabble," "biobunk," and pseudoscience. Her many writings have dealt with critical thinking, cognitive dissonance, anger, gender, and other topics in psychology.

Tavris received a B.A. in comparative literature and sociology from Brandeis University and a Ph.D. in social psychology from the University of Michigan. She has taught psychology at the University of California, Los Angeles and the New School for Social Research. She is a fellow of the Association for Psychological Science and the Committee for Skeptical Inquiry. Tavris was also a member of the editorial board of Psychological Science in the Public Interest. Her articles, book reviews, and op-eds have appeared in The New York Times, The Wall Street Journal, the Los Angeles Times, The Times Literary Supplement (TLS), Scientific American, and other publications. Her column "The Gadfly" in Skeptic Magazine ran from 2014 to 2024.

== Early life ==
In an interview with The Skeptics Society, Tavris described her early life. She grew up in Los Angeles, California, with her parents, Sam and Dorothy Tavris, secular Jews who promoted and practiced critical thinking and equality for women. She was encouraged to argue and discuss everything with them, from household rules to religion. Her parents gave her books about successful women—ranging from Phillis Wheatley to Susan B. Anthony—and her father taught her poetry and storytelling. Her grandparents were Russian Jews who emigrated to Chicago in 1910. Her mother, who earned a law degree at 21, became the sole breadwinner of the family in 1956 when Tavris’s father died suddenly. Tavris was 11 years old.

Tavris majored in comparative literature and sociology at Brandeis University, graduating summa cum laude and Phi Beta Kappa. Brandeis faculty in her field were enamored with Freud during her college years, and her senior thesis was a "Freudian analysis of Hamlet and Don Quixote." But her undergraduate infatuation with Freudian approaches did not survive her first year of graduate school. When Tavris went to the University of Michigan to get her Ph.D. in social psychology, she "fell in love with the process of science." She loved learning about the "different methods of investigating questions, from field work and experiments to interviews and observations." One reason she chose social psychology, rather than comparative literature, as her career was that she "liked the idea of testing ideas for their relative validity" and of being in a field whose research had immediate beneficial applications for people's private lives, relationships, and society.

== Career ==
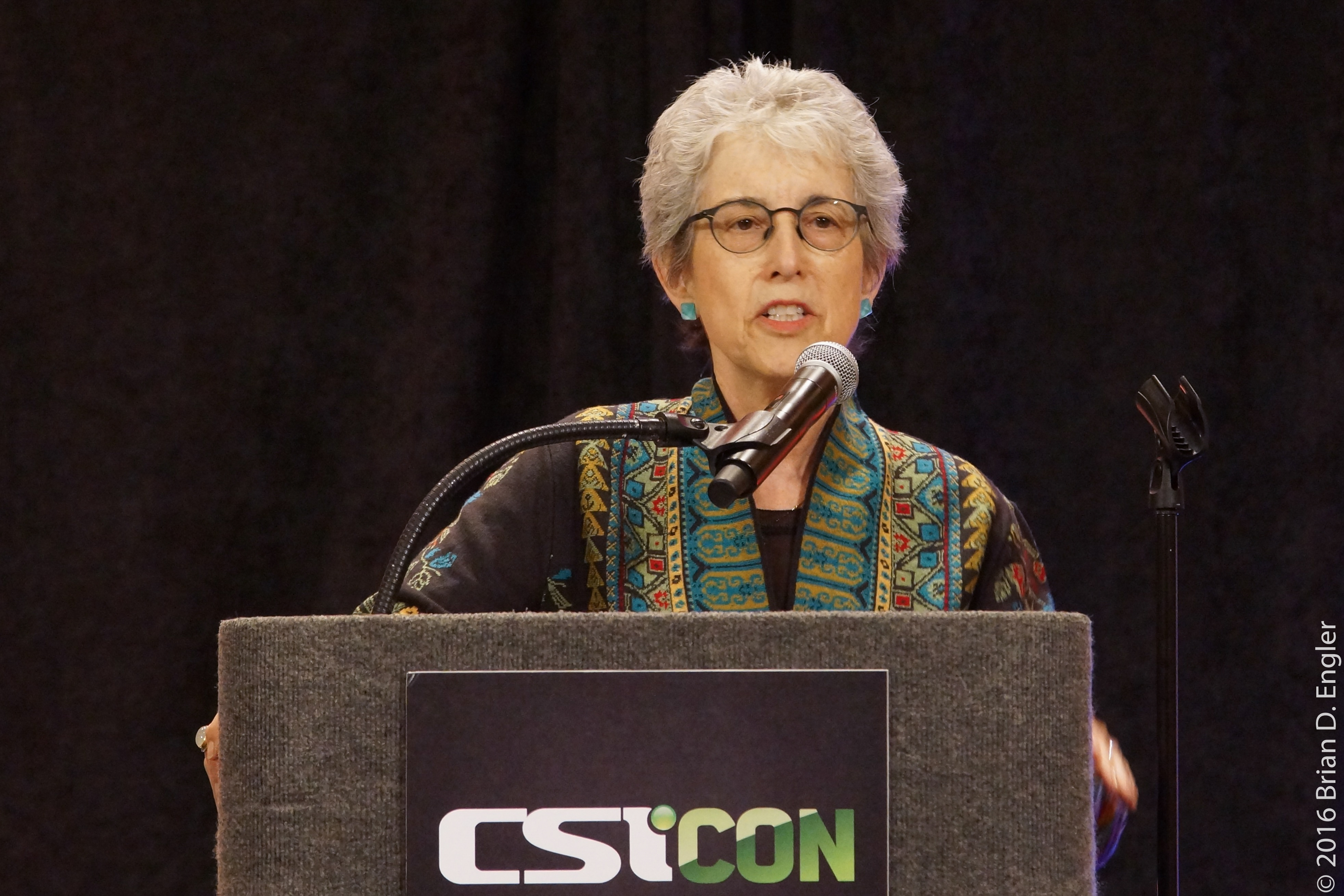
Why We Believe – Long After We Shouldn't CSICon 2016

Tavris took a year off from graduate school to write for a new magazine, Psychology Today. She returned to the magazine, after receiving her Ph.D., and she stayed for the next four years. She met Carole Wade, her future co-author, while writing for the publication. Together, the two of them taught one of the first courses in women's studies at San Diego State University, and out of that teaching collaboration, they wrote The Longest War: Sex Differences in Perspective, an interdisciplinary approach to the age-old question of why gender inequality exists.

In the 1980s, Tavris joined Carole Wade in writing an introductory psychology textbook, Psychology. It "was the first to explicitly and systematically integrate principles of critical thinking" into the introductory psychology course, along with mainstreaming research on gender and culture, with the goal of making the field more inclusive. Wade and Tavris also published Invitation to Psychology, a shorter version of their main textbook. As of 2025, Psychology is in its 14th edition and Invitation its 8th.

Tavris's first major trade book, Anger: The Misunderstood Emotion (1982, revised 1989), brought social-psychological research to light on many of the pop-psych, Freudian-based ideas about anger that were and are prevalent but wrong, such as that it is healthier, physically and psychologically, to "ventilate" anger than to "suppress" it. On the contrary, she showed, repeated venting rehearses anger, raises blood pressure, and often makes the other person angry back at you. In ways typical of her lifelong approach, she brought skepticism, data, and critical thinking to her evaluation of this and many other beliefs about anger. In her chapter on anger in social movements, she took as her main examples the efforts to promote women's rights and civil rights and the role of anger in igniting the pursuit of justice.

=== Cognitive dissonance ===
Another area of focus for Tavris is cognitive dissonance, a theory first developed by Leon Festinger and later advanced by his student, Elliot Aronson, into a theory of self-justification. Cognitive dissonance is the state of discomfort one feels when two beliefs, or a belief and behavior, contradict each other, or when a deeply held belief is disconfirmed by evidence. Written with the social psychologist Elliot Aronson, Tavris and Aronson's book, Mistakes Were Made (But Not by Me): Why We Justify Foolish Beliefs, Bad Decisions, and Hurtful Acts, delves into the effect cognitive dissonance has on people and on how they see both the world and themselves. The book, first published in 2007, was updated and revised for a second edition in 2015 and a third edition in 2020, with a new last chapter on the Trump phenomenon: "Dissonance, Democracy, and the Demagogue."

According to Tavris and Aronson, cognitive dissonance allows us to justify our mistakes and harms, keeping us from conscious awareness that we even made any, and thereby, allows us to live with ourselves. This is how even "charlatans, scammers, and tyrants sleep at night." Given a choice between accepting information that we don't want to hear and justifying outdated beliefs or hurtful acts, most people choose self-justification. Indeed, Tavris says, "the more we pride ourselves on our intelligence and our competence, the stronger our commitment to an ideology or philosophy of life, ... the harder it is to accept evidence that we might be wrong." Mistakes Were Made explains how cognitive dissonance applies in all domains of life, including presidents who start a war and then cannot end it, prosecutors who cannot accept that they put innocent people in prison, therapists who adopt the latest fad and cannot let it go when it proves unhelpful or harmful, quarreling couples who cannot understand the other person's point of view, and all the rest of us who find it difficult or impossible to give up a belief shown to be dated or wrong. Tavris has recorded numerous podcasts discussing the far-reaching applications of dissonance theory.

Tavris and Aronson use a pyramid metaphor to explain how self-justification can lead people far down a path they might never have imagined for themselves. Because of the need to reduce dissonance after we make a decision, once we have done so, we become less able "to think skeptically and scientifically about it." Our attitudes now change, to be consistent with our behavior, and we may end up far away from people who took a different path.

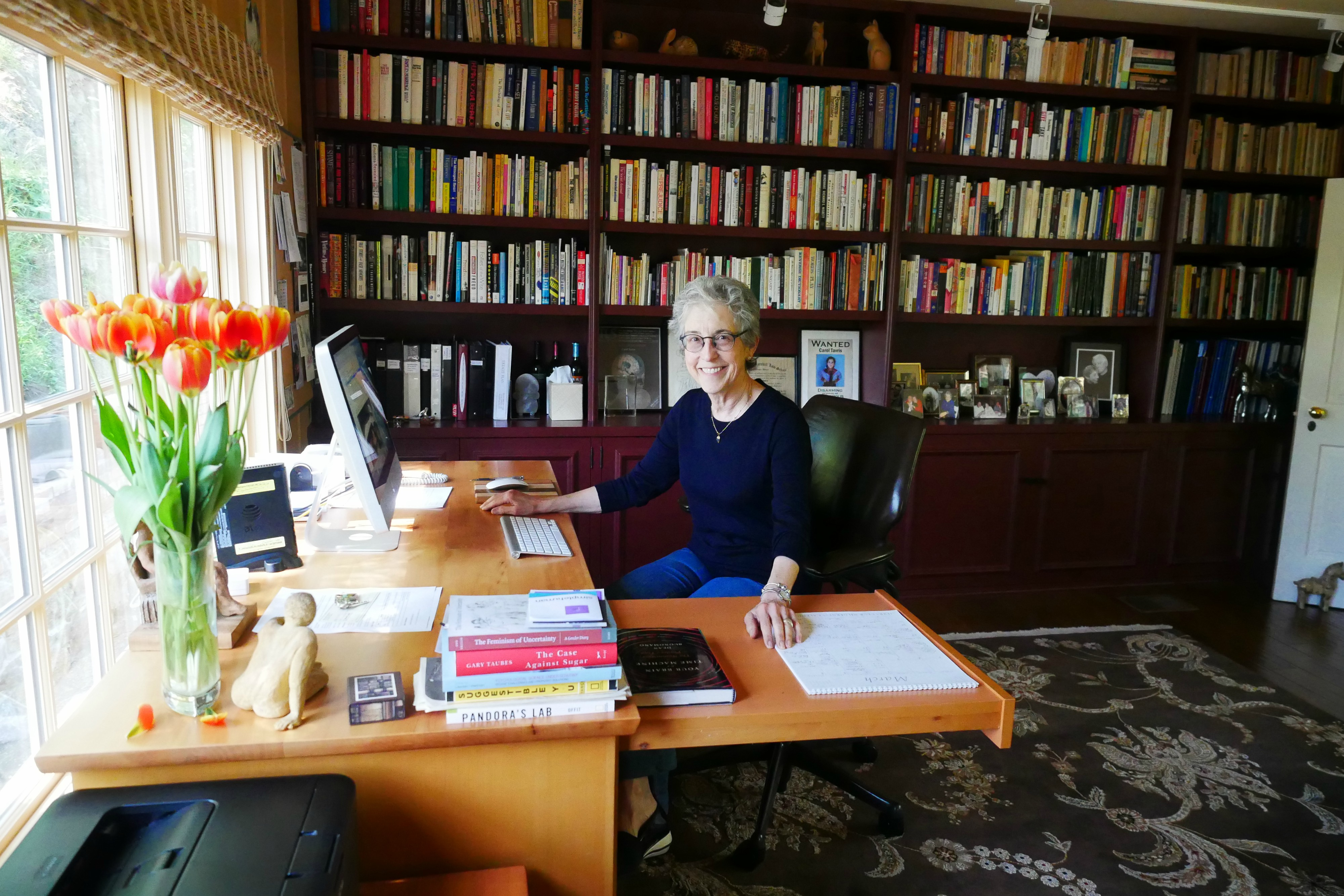
Tavris in office March 2017

=== Gender, feminism, and women's studies ===
Tavris began writing about women's status and gender differences in the 1970s. Her book with Carole Wade, The Longest War: Sex Differences in Perspective "[examines] the scientific evidence for and against many beliefs about women and women's lower status, both historically and cross-culturally."

In 1992, Tavris wrote The Mismeasure of Woman: Why Women Are Not the Better Sex, the Inferior Sex, or the Opposite Sex, a vigorous defense of equality feminism, the view that women are neither inferior to men nor superior to men but are entitled to equality, in all spheres. The title was an homage to Stephen Jay Gould's The Mismeasure of Man, because both books showed how societal prejudices can affect research—in his book, in the study of intelligence, and in hers, in the study of gender. Tavris's book draws on research in many disciplines to explode myths about "male and female" brains (a perennial issue), alleged gender differences in "natural" abilities, the social creation of "PMS,” and other popular beliefs.

In a final chapter, she examined and critically evaluated the emerging "recovered memory" epidemic in America, in which women were going into therapy and coming out believing they had been victims of sexual abuse for years but had repressed the memory. In January, 1993, she wrote a controversial but influential lead essay for The New York Times Book Review, "Beware the Incest-Survivor Machine," on the popular "sex-abuse-survivor" books, showing that their assumptions about memory, trauma, repression, and recovery were scientifically unwarranted. The Mismeasure of Woman received The Distinguished Media Contribution Award from the American Association of Applied and Preventive Psychology and the Heritage Publications Award from the division of the Psychology of Women of the American Psychological Association.

She co-authored the book Estrogen Matters with Avrum Bluming, a medical oncologist and emeritus Clinical Professor of Medicine at University of Southern California, in 2018; it was revised and updated in 2024. It refutes the claim that hormone replacement therapy is an unsafe treatment for postmenopausal women or those with a history of breast cancer. The book cites flaws in the methods and findings of the Women’s Health Initiative, whose claims about hormone therapy the authors describe as “misleading in the extreme”.

Tavris identifies as an equality feminist (in contrast to the strains of feminism that have promoted notions of female superiority or inherent differences in psychology and abilities). For Tavris, feminism and science are not incompatible; on the contrary, she regards the scientific method as a way to "further the goals of feminism, and feminism is a way of improving science." Tavris has long believed that science and critical thinking are "the major tools we have for assessing which ideas are better than others and of forcing ourselves to let go of ideas that don’t work." In this goal, she maintains, skepticism – a willingness to question received wisdom, to demand good evidence, to be willing to hold even our own ideological beliefs up to scrutiny – is an essential ally. So, she would add, is a sense of humor.

== Personal life ==
Tavris was married to the actor Ronan O'Casey until his death in April 2012.

She has testified as an expert witness in several court cases where evidence against a defendant was based on pseudoscientific, unvalidated psychological ideas, and she was an advisor for the National Center for Reason and Justice, an advocacy group that was devoted to fighting false allegations and wrongful convictions.

On August 21, 2010, Tavris was a special guest at the 10th Anniversary Gala by the Independent Investigations Group and received an award for contributions to skepticism and science. On May 10, 2013, she received an honorary doctorate of letters from Simmons College, and on February 27, 2015, she received the Media Achievement Award from the Society for Personality and Social Psychology. On July 27, 2016, she received the Bertrand Russell Distinguished Scholar award from the Foundation for Critical Thinking at Sonoma State.

== Bibliography ==
- Estrogen Matters: Why taking hormones in menopause can improve and lengthen women's lives – without raising the risk of breast cancer (with Avrum Bluming) (Little, Brown Spark 2018; revised and updated 2024) (ISBN 978-031657890-5)
- Mistakes Were Made (But Not by Me): Why We Justify Foolish Beliefs, Bad Decisions, and Hurtful Acts (with Elliot Aronson) (Third edition, Mariner Books, 2020) (ISBN 978-0358329619)
- Psychology (with Carole Wade, Samuel Sommers, and Lisa Shin) (13th edition, 2020, Pearson, ISBN 978-0135212622)
- Invitation to Psychology (with Carole Wade) (6th edition, 2014, Pearson, ISBN 978-0205035199)
- Psychobabble and Biobunk: Using Psychology to Think Critically About Issues in the News (Pearson, 2011, ISBN 978-0205015917)
- The Scientist and the Humanist: A festschrift in honor of Elliot Aronson (with Marti Hope Gonzales and Joshua Aronson) (New York: Psychology Press, 2010 ISBN 978-1848728677)
- Psychology in Perspective (with Carole Wade, Samuel Sommers, and Lisa Shin) (Three editions, latest 2001, Prentice Hall, ISBN 0130283266)
- The Mismeasure of Woman: Why Women Are Not the Better Sex, the Inferior Sex, or the Opposite Sex (Simon & Schuster, 1992) (ISBN 0671662740)
- Anger: The Misunderstood Emotion (1983, Revised edition 1989, Touchstone, ISBN 0671675230)
- EveryWoman's Emotional Well-Being: Heart & Mind, Body & Soul (Doubleday, 1986, ISBN 978-0385185615)
- The Longest War: Sex Differences in Perspective (with Carole Wade) (Harcourt Brace Jovanovich, 1977, revised 1984, ISBN 978-0155511866)
- The Redbook Report on Female Sexuality: 100,000 married women disclose the good news about sex (Delacorte, 1977, ISBN 978-0385288675)
