= Cognistat =

Cognitive screening test

- Purpose: cognitive screening test

Cognistat, formerly known as the Neurobehavioral Cognitive Status Examination (NCSE), is a cognitive screening test that assesses five cognitive ability areas (language, construction, memory, calculations and reasoning). The test was first presented in two articles that appeared in the Annals of Internal Medicine in 1987 describing its design rationale and comparing it with the mini–mental state examination (MMSE) in a population of neurosurgical patients.

== The test ==
Cognistat systematically surveys evolving neuro-medical, psychiatric and pharmacologic state factors that may impact on and invalidate cognitive testing. Normative data exist for adolescents, and adults in three age groups: 60–64, 65–74 and 75–84). Cognistat has been translated into eight languages (Spanish, French, Cantonese, Mandarin, Japanese, Hebrew, Swedish and Norwegian). It is a widely used cognitive screening tool by North American neuropsychologists. More than 150 peer-reviewed scientific articles describe Cognistat's use in patients with stroke, dementia, traumatic brain injury, major psychiatric disorders and substance abuse. It is used by internists, neurologists, neurosurgeons, physiatrists and psychiatrists, as well as psychologists, nurses, speech pathologists, occupational therapists and clinicians working in nursing homes.

== CAS (Cognistat assessment system) ==
A web-based version of Cognistat, the CAS (Cognistat assessment system), appeared in 2010. This on-line version of the test can be administered in Microsoft Windows and Apple Mac OS based operating systems. CAS provides cautions to the examiner, offers suggestions during testing and automatically generates a graphic profile of test results that can be compared with classic neurobehavioral disorders. The online test provides information related to the patient's medications, suggests specific cautions in interpreting test results and offers suggestions with regard to follow-up testing. CAS encourages the examiner to be mindful of the evolving neuro-medical context or micro-climate in which cognitive testing takes place. As such it allows the clinician to play an active role not only in assessment but also in designing treatment and rehabilitation strategies.
