= An Illustrated Book of Bad Arguments =

Book by Ali Almossawi

- Author: Ali Almossawi
- Illustrator: Alejandro Giraldo
- Language: English
- Subject: Critical thinking
- Publication date: 2013
- Publication place: USA
- Media type: Print (Hardback)
- Pages: 64
- ISBN: 978-0989931205

An Illustrated Book of Bad Arguments is a book on critical thinking written by Ali Almossawi and illustrated by Alejandro Giraldo. The book describes 19 logical fallacies using a set of illustrations, in which various cartoon characters participate.

The online version of the book was published under a Creative Commons license on July 15, 2013. The print edition was released on December 5, 2013 and is also shared under a Creative Commons license. The book is part of a not-for-profit project aimed at raising awareness of the importance of critical thinking.

== Style ==
Each "bad argument" is discussed on a double page, with a written explanation on one side and an illustration on the other. The book is written using terse prose that relies heavily on the use of examples. The illustrations are done in a woodcut style and are said to be inspired by characters from Lewis Carroll's stories and poems.

== Editions ==
Moscow-based Dodo Magic Bookroom published the Russian edition on November 24, 2013, the Rome-based humanist non-profit association Uaar published the Italian edition as Nessun Dogma on November 20, 2014.

The audiobook version is narrated by former BBC announcer and newsreader James Gillies. In it, illustrations have been replaced with short sketches.

== Reception ==
The Omaha World-Herald's review said that "this little book takes a potentially ponderous subject (logical fallacies) and makes it wonderfully entertaining." Jenny Bristol reviewed it for the community blog GeekDad, calling it "a great format for teaching kids about logic".

L'Express reviewed the French version of the book, concluding that it is “a short and perfectly organized book that examines and dismantles a score of fallacious arguments … [with] illustrations largely inspired by allegories of Animal Farm by G. Orwell and the work of Lewis Caroll”. The Spanish version of the book was reviewed by Rafael Martínez for Loffit, and it emphasized how effectively the book's lessons could be learned by listening to various debates heard every day on radio and television, identifying in them examples of logical fallacies that the book explains.

In December 2016, the author announced the follow-on project, titled Bad Choices, describing it as an illustrated guide to algorithmic thinking. The book was released on April 4, 2017.
