= Why People Believe Weird Things =

1997 book by Michael Shermer

Why People Believe Weird Things: Pseudoscience, Superstition, and Other Confusions of Our Time
- Cover of the first edition
- Author: Michael Shermer
- Language: English
- Subject: Belief
- Publisher: Henry Holt and Company
- Publication date: 1997
- Publication place: United States
- Media type: Print
- Pages: 306 pp.
- ISBN: 978-1567313598
- OCLC: 49874665
- Dewey Decimal: 133 21
- LC Class: Q172.5.P77 S48 2002
- Preceded by: Cycling: Endurance and Speed
- Followed by: Teach Your Child Math and Mathemagics

Why People Believe Weird Things: Pseudoscience, Superstition, and Other Confusions of Our Time is a 1997 book by science writer Michael Shermer. The foreword was written by Stephen Jay Gould.

== Summary ==
In the first section, Shermer discusses the ideas that he has towards racism. He also explains his conversion to Deism from New Age mysticism (to which he had converted from being a Fundamentalist Christian Baptist).

In part two Shermer explains paranormal thinking and how one comes to believe in things without evidence. He uses Edgar Cayce as an example, and while he agrees with parts of Ayn Rand's Objectivism, he criticizes its moral absolutism and argues that many follow her philosophy unquestioningly, which he believes contradicts free thinking.

Part three begins with Shermer describing several debates he had with Duane Gish. He lays out some creationist arguments in 25 separate claims, and attempts to debunk each one with his own evidence. He closes retelling how a constitutional ban on teaching creationism in public schools was narrowly upheld at the Supreme Court of the United States in 1987.

Shermer shows that the Holocaust deniers reject proven facts for, as he states, ideological reasons. Like the creationists, he asserted, many Holocaust deniers believe that the evidence sides with them. He describes meeting and arguing with the deniers and lays out their arguments then shows evidence to support his own statements.

In part five Shermer relates Frank J. Tipler to Voltaire's character Pangloss to show how smart people deceive themselves. Shermer explores the psychology of scholars and business men who give up their careers in their pursuit to broadcast their paranormal beliefs. In his last chapter, added to the revised version, Shermer explains why he believes that "intelligent people" can be more susceptible to believing in weird things than others.

== Reception ==
According to Reason, "Shermer's episodic book covers a wide range of subjects, in a wide range of manners. He takes ritual jabs at such old debunker punching bags as ESP and UFOs (through UFOlogy's newest twist, alien abduction of humans). You'll also find cogent debunkings of strange phenomena such as fire walking and psychics who can discover "unknowable" facts about strangers. The longest sections of the book take on the more-substantive issues of creationism and Holocaust denial." It was given 4 out of 5 stars by popularscience.co.uk, which said "In this classic, originally published in 1997 but reviewed in a new UK edition, he gives a powerful argument for taking the sceptical viewpoint". According to the Los Angeles Times, "Shermer's directly written book is the perfect handbook to thrust on anyone you know who has been lured into conforming paranoias that circulate amid the premillennial jitters."

The Independent Thinking Review wrote, "This is a book that deserves to be widely read. Skeptics and critical thinkers can learn from it, but more importantly, it's a book to give those who maybe aren't as skeptical as you, those who need some clear and reasonable arguments to gently push them in a more critical direction. Read this book yourself: buy it for someone whose mind you care about."

== See also ==
- Skepticism
- The Psychology of the Occult
