= Mistakes Were Made (but Not by Me) =

2007 non-fiction book by Carol Tavris and Elliot Aronson

Mistakes Were Made (but Not by Me): Why We Justify Foolish Beliefs, Bad Decisions, and Hurtful Acts
- Author: Carol Tavris, Elliot Aronson
- Cover artist: Jennifer Jackman
- Language: English
- Subject: Psychology
- Publisher: Harcourt
- Publication date: 2007
- Publication place: United States
- Media type: Hardcover
- Pages: 298
- ISBN: 978-0-15-101098-1
- OCLC: 71005837
- Dewey Decimal: 153 22
- LC Class: BF337.C63 T38 2007

Mistakes Were Made (but Not by Me) is a 2007 non-fiction book by social psychologists Carol Tavris and Elliot Aronson. It deals with cognitive dissonance, confirmation bias, and other cognitive biases, using these psychological theories to illustrate how the perpetrators (and victims) of hurtful acts justify and rationalize their behavior. It describes a positive feedback loop of action and self-deception by which slight differences between people's attitudes become polarized.

== Topics and people mentioned ==
- The doomsday cult described in When Prophecy Fails
- The MMR vaccine controversy and Andrew Wakefield
- Conflict escalation in marriage and intergroup relations
- Day care sex abuse hysteria, alien abduction memories, and false memory syndrome
- Statements by Al Campanis and Mel Gibson justifying racism
- Confabulation of autobiographical memory
- False certainty in pseudoscience
- Self-justification and conflict of interest in medicine and politics
- George W. Bush and the Iraq War
- Justification of aggression, war, and torture
- Criminal interrogation, the pseudoscientific Reid technique, and false confessions
- Trials, capital punishment, police perjury, and miscarriage of justice
- Oprah Winfrey and her involvement in the James Frey controversy
- Carol Dweck's research on mistakes and learning

== Reception ==
Philosopher Daniele Procida described the book as an "immensely engaging and intelligent volume" and "a genuinely illuminating contribution to the study of human nature" but also criticised the book's informal style and sometimes outdated assumptions.

Michael Shermer, in the Scientific American, wrote that Tavris and Aronson brilliantly illuminate the fallacies that underlie irrational behavior.

A review in O, The Oprah Magazine praised the book for "the scientific evidence it provides and the charm of its down-to-earth, commonsensical tone.”

A review in The Guardian described the book as "excellent" and suggests the quotation, "If mistakes were made, memory helps us remember that they were made by someone else,” should be printed on autobiographies and political memoirs as a warning to the public. The British comedian and novelist Alexei Sayle listed the book among his six favorites, recommending it as "endlessly fascinating, if you're interested in politics."

== See also ==
- List of cognitive biases
- List of memory biases
- Mistakes were made
- Non-apology apology
- Non-denial denial
