= The Devil in Dover =

2008 book by Lauri Lebo

- Cover
- Author: Lauri Lebo
- Language: English
- Subjects: Intelligent design Kitzmiller v. Dover Area School District
- Publisher: The New Press
- Publication date: 2008
- Publication place: United States
- Media type: Print
- Pages: 256
- ISBN: 978-1-59558-208-9
- Dewey Decimal: 345.73/0288 22
- LC Class: KF228.K589 L43 2008

The Devil in Dover: An Insider's Story of Dogma v. Darwin in Small-Town America is a 2008 book by journalist Lauri Lebo about the Kitzmiller v. Dover Area School District intelligent design trial, through her own perspective as a local reporter on the trial as she confronted her own attitudes about organized religion and her father who was a fundamentalist Christian.

== Themes ==
Lebo explores the behind-the-scenes events that led to the filing of a lawsuit by Tammy Kitzmiller and ten other parents in Dover, Pennsylvania in 2005 and covers the events of the trial up to and after the verdict for the plaintiffs by Judge John E. Jones III, with an emphasis on what the case meant for the citizens of Dover.

She deals with the involvement of outside parties like the Discovery Institute, Thomas More Law Center, ACLU, the scientific, religious and philosophical issues raised by the intelligent design movement, and the pitfalls for journalists covering a controversy like Kitzmiller, particularly small-town reporters.

Lebo details her personal experience of the trial, including her interactions with her fundamentalist father, who favored the defendants.

=== From the use of Creationism to Intelligent Design ===
The differences (or lack thereof) between Intelligent Design and Creationism were a major theme in the book. Lebo details the explicit Christian-based intentions of the Dover school board (page numbers are from the book):

1. The intent to introduce Christianity into science classes
  1. Weeks after Alan Bonsell took his oath of office for the Dover School Board, he spoke of Creationism and school prayer. (p. 11)
  2. The school board used public funds to send Assistant Superintendent Michael Baksa to a Christian college-sponsored conference on teaching Creationism. (p. 16)
  3. When Bonsell saw recent Dover high school graduate Zach Strausbaugh's painting of an evolutionary sequence (visible from 5:56 to 7:06 in Lebo - From Dover to DNA: How science-literate communities can change the narrative.", Bonsell was disgusted that students were learning things in science class that he thought contradicted the Bible (p. 12), although:
    1. many have argued that the Bible contradicts itself on this very issue; and
    2. many Christians accept and even promote evolution, most notably in relation to the Kitzmiller v. Dover case, cell biologist and molecular biologist Kenneth R. Miller, one of the leading scientists for the plaintiffs.
  4. Days before the teachers returned from summer break for the 2002-2003 school year, the school janitor burned the painting in the school parking lot. When science teacher Bertha Spahr demanded in administration office to know what had happened to the painting, "She was told to mind her own business."(p. 13,19)
  5. In 2003, Bonsell recruited Jane Cleaver, an eighth-grade dropout, who had petitioned the school board to allow school-sponsored prayer, to the school board. (pp. 13–14)
  6. Bonsell also recruited fundamentalist Christian Bill Buckingham, also lacking in any education credentials, to the Dover school board.(p. 14)
  7. Bonsell and Buckingham spoke to administrators and the school superintendent of plans to require the teaching of Creationism alongside evolution.(pp. 16, 19-20)
  8. Although they did not necessarily deny Darwin's contributions, science teachers were skimming over subjects key to biology, such as the fossil record and common descent,(pp.17-18) in appeasement to local theistic anti-science attitudes, such as those of the majority of school board members.
  9. Dover principal Trudy Peterman received a bad performance review after writing a memo questioning the administration on creationist conversations.(p.20)
  10. Bonsell put direct pressure on teachers. In one meeting, Jen Miller nervously assured Bonsell that her chapter on evolution taught only "change over time", not the origin of life.(p. 21) (Evolution is change in the heritable characteristics of biological populations over successive generations and thus does not specifically address the origin of life, although many non-biologists assume that evolution includes abiogenesis.)
  11. Bonsell told teachers that he did not want his daughter learning about evolution and "teachers could be accused of lying to students if they taught them something that contradicts (the students') faith."(pp.20-21)
  12. Fearing retribution based on the above meeting, a science teacher ceased her creative teaching methods and stuck to the text book.(p.21)
  13. In 2003, when the US Supreme Court was about to review the constitutionality of the phrase "Under God" in the US Pledge of Allegiance as a result of a suit by New York-born atheist Michael Newdow, Bonsell urged the school board to adopt a resolution in support of the two words, arguing that the USA was founded on Christianity and people who began to infringe on US "Christian values" should return to where they came from.(p. 21)
  14. In a public meeting on 2004-06-07, curriculum committee chair Bill Buckingham said he would not buy the new biology textbooks because they were "laced with Darwinism (sic)", and wanted a book that was "balanced with Creationism". Board president Bonsell and member Wenrich also spoke in support of teaching creationism. Bonsell also equated the consistent teaching of evolution with brainwashing.(pp. 22–23)
  15. At the 2004-06-14 public meeting, Bonsell protested that (United States) Constitution does not call for a separation of church and state. (Most related legal issues hinge on the establishment clause). Bonsell was quoted by two journalists as saying, "Two thousand years ago someone died on the cross. Won't somebody stand up for him?" The quote appeared in two newspapers the next day and Bonsell did not deny the statement for several months. Bill Buckingham told reporter Maldonado that the US was founded on Christianity and students should be taught that.(pp. 23–25)
  16. School board member Heather Geesey wrote a letter on 2004-06-27 to the editor of the York Daily Record promoting the teaching of Creationism. She did not mention Intelligent Design. In her trial testimony she claimed the newspapers were reporting incorrectly that the board was talking about Creationism and that the appearance of her Creationism letter during the trial reminded her that the board was not talking about Creationism.(pp. 166–167)
2. From "Christianity" to "Intelligent Design" in public
  1. As president of the school board, Bonsell gave the school superintendent two Discovery Institute DVDs attacking evolution.(p. 21)
  2. The Dover school board accepted the Thomas More Law Center, whose motto is "The sword and the shield for people of faith"—and its mission statement makes it clear that that faith is Christianity—as its legal representation in what would become Kitzmiller v. Dover. The law center actively pushed the book Of Pandas And People, claiming that it was science, not religion(p. 27). The Dover school board would soon champion the book, too.(p. 45).
  3. Of Pandas And People drafts proved that the publisher, Foundation for Thought and Ethics had performed a copy-and-(repeated)-paste operation on the text, replacing, for example "Creationists" with "design proponents" after the Edwards v. Aguillard case, in which the US Supreme Court ruled that a Louisiana law requiring that creation science be taught in public schools, along with evolution, violated the Establishment Clause of the First Amendment because the law was specifically intended to advance a particular religion.
  4. Bill Buckingham described Intelligent Design as a scientific form of Creationism.(p. 29)
  5. At the next school board meeting, the members stopped using the term Creationism and started using Intelligent Design publicly.(p. 30)
3. ...But still "Christianity" in private
  1. In executive board meetings, according to Jeff and Casey Brown, the board still spoke of leading a Christian revolution.(p. 33)
  2. The board's regular attorney, Steve Russell, was married to the board secretary and knew the board's intentions. He reminded them that they had already revealed their theistic intentions and recommended that they cease this pursuit or be sued and lose. The board responded by telling him not to come to meetings anymore.(p. 34)

== Reviews ==
The New York Times reviewer Charles McGrath recommended The Devil in Dover as a starting place to study:

... the great American tradition of anti-intellectualism, which seems to be getting stronger, not weaker, even as the country supposedly becomes better educated, and about the strange way we're turning the court system, of all places, into a referee on scientific principles.

In the Texas Observer, Ruth Pennebaker called it an "excellent, troubling book" and added:

Reading The Devil in Dover, I saw members of my extended family, best friends from my earliest years, neighbors, shop owners, acquaintances, people I went to church and Sunday school with when I was a child, people who passed the communion tray to me once a month when we all knelt at the altar. ... I love many of those people, and I know they love me. But our hearts harden toward one another on issues like evolution, intellectual freedom, science, and tolerance toward different views and people.

In an article in the Columbia Journalism Review on the "religion beat," Tim Townsend praised the book for giving readers a feeling of what it was like leading up to the trial and immediately afterwards, but criticized it for having unnecessary subplots about Lebo's personal experiences with her father and her own beliefs.

The Patriot-News in Harrisburg took the opposite tack, saying "This is the fourth book about the Dover case, but Lebo avoids the problems of her predecessors, who didn't know the territory as well and sometimes bogged down in courtroom testimony"
