= Estrogen Matters =

2018 book by Avrum Bluming and Carol Tavris

- Author: Avrum Bluming and Carol Tavris
- Subject: Menopause
- Publisher: Little, Brown Spark
- Publication date: September 4, 2018
- Media type: Print (hardcover), audiobook, e-book
- Pages: 320
- ISBN: 978-0316481205
- OCLC: 0316481203

Estrogen Matters: Why Taking Hormones in Menopause Can Improve and Lengthen Women's Lives — Without Raising the Risk of Breast Cancer is a 2024 revision of a 2018 book written by Avrum Bluming and Carol Tavris. It refutes the claim that hormone replacement therapy (HRT) is an unsafe treatment for postmenopausal women or those with a history of breast cancer.

== Summary ==
First released in 2018 and updated and revised in 2024, Estrogen Matters is an analysis of the many claims made by the Women's Health Initiative (WHI) since its first press conference in 2002, when it reported that hormone replacement therapy (estrogen plus progesterone) for menopausal symptoms increases the risk of breast cancer, other diseases, and even all-cause mortality. The authors identify significant flaws of data analysis and interpretation in the WHI’s claims, many of which were not statistically significant, others which were subsequently overturned, and still others that inappropriately generalized from a sample that was not representative of healthy menopausal women.

It also presents many decades of research about additional studies that support the use of HRT for women in menopause and beyond including to reduce the risk of cardiovascular disease, osteoporosis, and dementia, while increasing longevity by three to four years. Bluming indicates "We wrote the book to be used by both doctors and patients. It takes difficult information and makes it understandable for the lay person."

In follow-up studies in 2012 and 2019 WHI acknowledged that HRT therapy reduces the risk of cognitive decline, heart disease, and osteoporosis. They also reported that prior use of estrogen alone, compared with placebo, among women who had a previous hysterectomy was significantly associated with a 23% lower breast cancer incidence and a 40% lower breast cancer mortality.

The book expands on research Bluming and Tavris presented in The Cancer Journal in 2009 and a 2012 article in the journal Climacteric titled Chains of evidence, mosaics of data: does estrogen ‘cause’ breast cancer? How would we know? In the article they compare causal "chain of evidence" for disease and epidemiological evidence in a form of more scattered findings they label as mosaics.

Translations of Estrogen Matters are available in German, Spanish, Polish, and Chinese.

== Chapters ==
Introduction: Who Killed HRT?

1. The “Change of Life” and the Quality of Life
2. Does Estrogen Cause Breast Cancer?
3. Can Breast Cancer Survivors Take Estrogen?
4. Matters of the Heart
5. Breaking Bad
6. Losing and Using Our Minds
7. Progesterone and the Pill
8. Debates and Final Lessons in the Case for HRT

Epilogue: Martha, Medicine, and Making Decisions
