= The Pleasure of Finding Things Out =

1999 book by Richard Feynman

- 1999 hardcover edition
- Editor: Jeffrey Robbins
- Author: Richard Feynman
- Cover artist: Bruce W. Bond
- Language: English
- Series: Helix Books
- Subject: Science
- Genre: Non-fiction
- Publisher: Perseus Books
- Publication date: July 1999
- Publication place: United States
- Media type: Print (Hardcover)
- Pages: 270
- ISBN: 0-7382-0108-1
- OCLC: 42564066
- Dewey Decimal: 500 21
- LC Class: Q171 .F385 1999

The Pleasure of Finding Things Out: The Best Short Works of Richard P. Feynman is a posthumous collection of interviews, speeches, lectures, and articles by the American physicist Richard Feynman. It was edited by Jeffrey Robbins and published by Perseus Books in 1999. The foreword is by Freeman Dyson.

The book reprints thirteen pieces, including the 1959 lecture "There's Plenty of Room at the Bottom", Feynman's minority report on the Space Shuttle Challenger disaster, and the 1974 Caltech commencement address in which he coined the term "cargo cult science". The opening chapter is a transcript of his 1981 interview for the BBC series Horizon, later shown in the United States on Nova.

== Contents ==
The volume collects the following pieces:

- "The Pleasure of Finding Things Out" (BBC Horizon interview, 1981)
- "Computing Machines in the Future" (Nishina Memorial Lecture, 1985)
- "Los Alamos from Below"
- "What Is and What Should Be the Role of Scientific Culture in Modern Society" (Galileo Symposium, 1964)
- "There's Plenty of Room at the Bottom" (1959)
- "The Value of Science" (1955)
- "Richard P. Feynman's Minority Report to the Space Shuttle Challenger Inquiry" (1986)
- "What Is Science?" (1966)
- "The Smartest Man in the World"
- "Cargo Cult Science"
- "It's as Simple as One, Two, Three"
- "Richard Feynman Builds a Universe"
- "The Relation of Science and Religion" (1956)

== Reception ==
Robert Root-Bernstein wrote in American Scientist that some of the pieces were "vintage Feynman" but that the book was inconsistent, "badly organized and targeted at no obvious audience". He pointed out that items such as "Los Alamos from Below" overlap with Surely You're Joking, Mr. Feynman! and What Do You Care What Other People Think?, and thought "There's Plenty of Room at the Bottom", "Computing Machines in the Future", and the Challenger report were the main reason to collect the texts. Edward Neuert, in Salon, called it "as illuminating, pleasurable and frustrating as the scientist himself" and noted how much of it is lightly edited speech. Charles Platt reviewed it in Wired. Eric B. Norman also reviewed it in The American Biology Teacher.
