= Edward Humes =

American journalist and non-fiction writer

- Born: Philadelphia, Pennsylvania
- Education: Hampshire College
- Occupations: Journalist, writer
- Writing career
- Notable awards: Pulitzer Prize for Specialized Reporting

Edward Humes is an American journalist and non-fiction writer.

== Biography ==
Humes was born in Philadelphia and attended Hampshire College.

In 1989 he received the Pulitzer Prize for specialized reporting for investigative stories he wrote about the United States military for the Orange County Register.

Afterward, he began writing non-fiction books. Humes is the author of 13 nonfiction books, including the bestselling Mississippi Mud; No Matter How Loud I Shout; Baby E.R.; A Man and His Mountain; and Garbology, a popular selection for the First Year Experience program on college campuses.

In 2001, Humes spent a year teaching a writing workshop at Whitney High School in Cerritos, California, a middle-class Los Angeles suburb. His observations while at the school led to his narrative non-fiction book School of Dreams, published in 2004.

Humes is a contributing writer for Sierra Magazine, California Lawyer and Los Angeles Magazine, among other publications. He is married to journalist and author Donna Wares and lives in Southern California.

== Books ==
=== Non-fiction ===
- Humes, Edward (2016). Door to Door: The Magnificent, Maddening, Mysterious World of Transportation. New York: Harper. ISBN 978-0062372079.
- Humes, Edward (2013). A Man and his Mountain: The Everyman who Created Kendall-Jackson and Became America's Greatest Wine Entrepreneur. New York: PublicAffairs. ISBN 9781610392853.
- Garbology: Our Dirty Love Affair with Trash Publisher: Avery (April 19, 2012) ISBN 978-1-58333-434-8
- Humes, Edward (2007). Monkey Girl: Evolution, Education, Religion, and the Battle for America's Soul. Ecco/HarperCollins. ISBN 978-0-06-088548-9.
- Humes, Edward (2006). Over Here: How the G.I. Bill Transformed the American Dream. Harcourt. ISBN 0-15-100710-1.
- Humes, Edward (2004). School of Dreams : Making the Grade at a Top American High School. Harcourt/Harvest Books. ISBN 0-15-603007-1.
- Humes, Edward (2004). My California: Journeys by Great Writers. Angel City Press. ISBN 1-883318-43-2. (contributor)
- Humes, Edward (2004). Baby ER: The Heroic Doctors and Nurses Who Perform Medicine's Tiniest Miracles. Simon & Schuster. ASIN B000A9GLXG.
- Humes, Edward (2003). Mean Justice. Pocket. ISBN 0-671-03427-8.
- Humes, Edward (1997). No Matter How Loud I Shout: A Year in the Life of Juvenile Court. Simon & Schuster. ISBN 0-684-81195-2.

=== True crime ===
- "The Forever Witness: How DNA and Genealogy Solved a Cold Case Double Murder", Penguin Putnam Inc, November 29, 2022
- Burned: A Story of Murder and the Crime That Wasn't, Dutton, ISBN 9781524742133, January 8, 2019
- Mississippi Mud: Southern Justice and the Dixie Mafia, Pocket, ISBN 0-671-53505-6, December 1, 1995
- Buried Secrets: A True Story of Serial Murder, New Amer Library, ISBN 0-451-17164-0
- Murderer With a Badge: The Secret Life of a Rogue Cop, E P Dutton, ISBN 0-525-93498-7, November 1, 1992

=== Article ===
- Talk Radio Evolution, The Huffington Post, February 23, 2007.
