= Taner Edis =

Turkish American physicist and skeptic

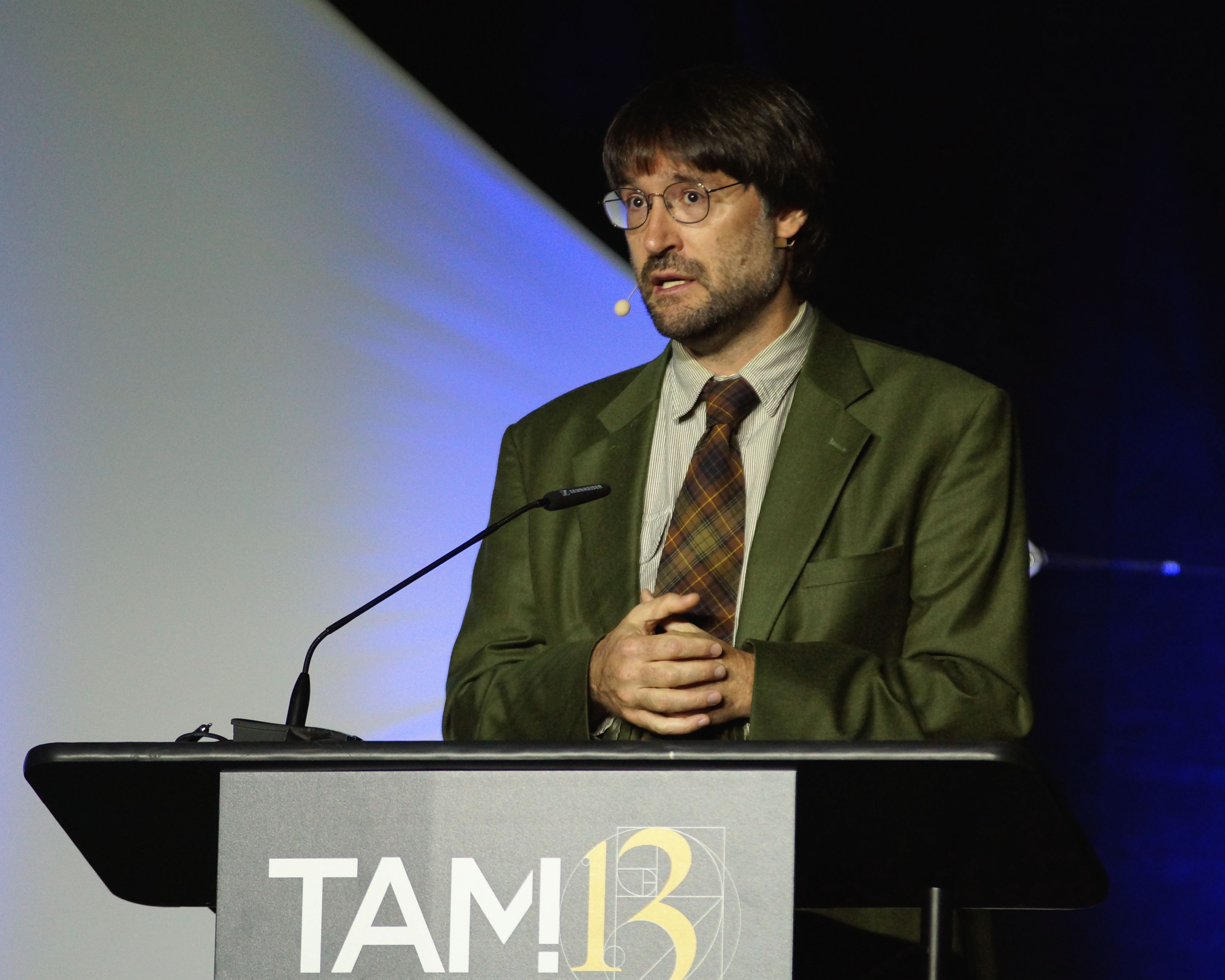
- At The Amaz!ng Meeting - July 2015
- Born: August 20, 1967 (age 59)
- Education: Boğaziçi University B.S.; Johns Hopkins University M.A., Ph.D.
- Known for: Author
- Scientific career
- Fields: Theoretical physics, condensed matter physics
- Workplaces: Truman State University; Lawrence Livermore National Laboratory; Southern University
- Thesis: Theoretical analysis of Josephson junction systems and superconducting superlattices (1995)
- Website: edis.sites.truman.edu

Taner Edis (born August 20, 1967) is a Turkish American physicist and skeptic. He is a professor of physics at Truman State University. He received his B.S. from Boğaziçi University in Turkey and his M.A. and Ph.D. from Johns Hopkins University. Edis is the author of several books on creationism, religion and science. He is a fellow for the Committee for Skeptical Inquiry.

== Early life ==
Born in Istanbul, Turkey to secular Turkish and American parents, Edis traveled to the United States many times in his childhood.

Edis has lived in the United States since starting his master's degree at Johns Hopkins University. He earned his Ph.D. in 1994. He first encountered creationism during his studies in America – he thought it an "American oddity".

== Career ==
Edis is professor of physics at Truman State University. He became a fellow for Committee for Skeptical Inquiry in 2022.

== Skepticism ==
Edis's research "focuses on paranormal and supernatural claims and explores what their failures say about the nature of science". He is particularly interested in Islamic creationism and the American intelligent design movement. Edis has been called "a liberal atheist, secular humanist and a zealous proselyte of scientific reason".

Fascinated by the plethora of supernatural and fringe science beliefs around him, and concerned about the rise of Islamist politics back in Turkey, Edis first got involved with skeptical inquiry into religious and paranormal claims during his graduate studies. "Science is difficult," states Edis to Point of Inquiry interviewer D.J. Grothe in answer to a question about why science has not replaced religion. Edis explains to his students that they will have difficulty understanding this "because the human brain is not wired to understand something like quantum mechanics and neutrinos correctly, it's a struggle." In an interview with Susan Gerbic at CSICon, Edis characterized his more recent writings on the subjects of science and skepticism by saying that "it might [even] be rational to believe in certain falsehoods. The argument turns on the costs of acquiring and possessing beliefs; sometimes truth is just too costly."

Edis has given several lectures about Islamic creationism. One of his premises is that creationism in the United States is quite moderate compared to Islamic countries. Turkey for example, despite being known as a secular state, has high levels of belief in a young Earth. This is because the textbooks and curriculum in the schools do not offer both evolution and creationism, but only creationism. Teaching evolution is not part of the syllabus at all. Grothe asked Taner in 2007 if he thought that Islam could be compatible with western science. His answer was that it just depends on the type of Islam. As in Christianity there are both liberal and conservative Muslims. The more liberal their views the more compatible they are with science.

Concerning crop circles Edis wrote that we know how these are created, we know the techniques. "So we do not need to find the perpetrator of every crop circle to figure out that probably they all are human made. Many true believers remain who continue to think there is something paranormal — perhaps alien — about crop circles. But the circles we know all fall within the range of the sort of thing done in hoaxes. Nothing stands out as extraordinary."

One thing I think we need to be more impressed with, is how naturally religion comes to a normal human mind. ... It is not so much death of perception of supernatural agents all around us, it's that organized religion has lost its ability to convince people. That's very different than people becoming science-minded skeptics and rationalists... it's religion fading away that is the default."

== Reception ==
Edis was an editor of the book Why Intelligent Design Fails, which has received positive reviews. His book The Ghost in the Universe received the Morris D. Forkosch Book Award for "Best Humanist Book of 2002"

Reviewing Edis's 2016 book, Islam evolving: radicalism, reformation, and the uneasy relationship with the secular West, J.P. Dunn writes that Edis gives a wide-ranging exposition of how the Qur'an has been variously interpreted to provide an alternative to Western beliefs, and that this will "challenge, offend, and enlighten" the book's readers.

Within the context of Islam and science, Algerian astrophysicist Nidhal Guessoum categorizes Edis as a kind of "anti-harmonizer", who rejects the possibility that the two systems are reconciled. Guessoum writes that while Edis acknowledges that modern thinkers within Islam do not fully embrace anti-scientific religious dogmas, Edis is also "unhappy" that the materialist nature of science is not fully embraced.

Philosopher John Gray reviewed Edis's 2006 book, An Illusion of Harmony: Science and religion in Islam for The New Scientist. Gray writes that Edis's thesis is that there is a fundamental incompatibility between Islam and science because of the religion's dogmatic precepts. Gray calls Edis's work "one of the few recent books that truly illuminates the troubled relationship between science and religion".

== Selected publications ==
- Edis, Taner (2023). Islam's Encounter with Modern Science. Cambridge University Press. ISBN 9781009257473.
- Edis, T. (2021). Weirdness! What Fake Science and the Paranormal Tell Us about the Nature of Science. United States: Pitchstone Publishing. ISBN 9781634312127.
- Edis, T. (2016). Islam Evolving: Radicalism, Reformation, and the Uneasy Relationship with the Secular West. Amherst, N.Y.: Prometheus Books. ISBN 978-1-63388-189-1. OCLC 940455332.
- Edis, T. (2007). An Illusion of Harmony: Science and Religion in Islam. Amherst, N.Y.: Prometheus Books. ISBN 9781591024491. OCLC 71948044.
- Edis, T. (2006). Science and Nonbelief. Greenwood Guides to Science and Religion. Westport, Connecticut: Greenwood Press. ISBN 9780313330780. OCLC 61131830.
- Young, Matt; Edis, Taner, eds. (2004). Why Intelligent Design Fails: A Scientific Critique of the New Creationism. New Brunswick, NJ: Rutgers University Press. ISBN 0-8135-3433-X. LCCN 2003020100. OCLC 59717533.
- Edis, T. (2002). The Ghost in the Universe: God in Light of Modern Science. Amherst, N.Y.: Prometheus Books. ISBN 9781573929776. OCLC 694847577.
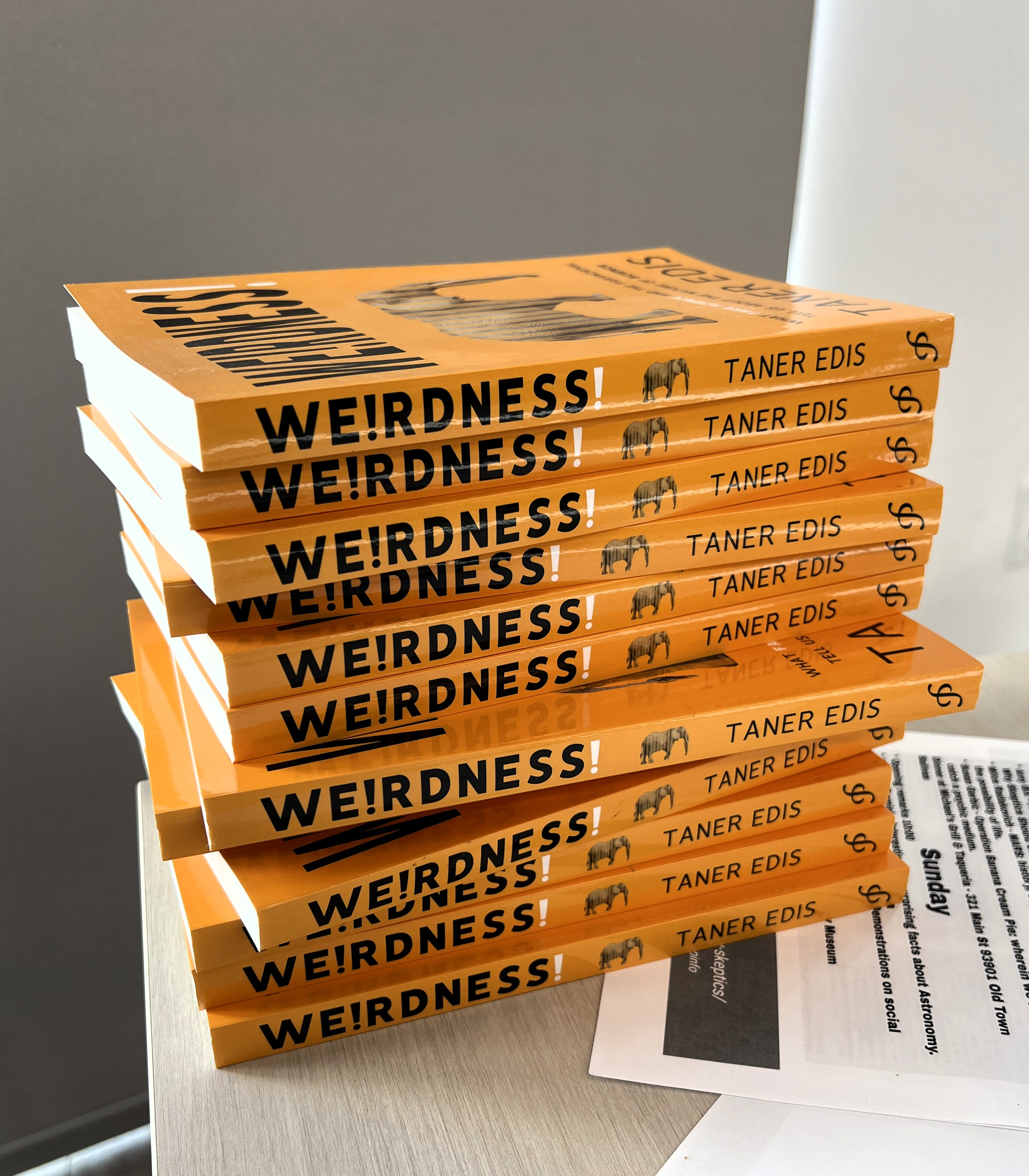
Weirdness! What Fake Science and the Paranormal Tell Us about the Nature of Science
