= Chupacabra =

Legendary creature in folklore of the Americas

Creature information
- Other name(s): Chupacabras, El Chupacabra
- Similar entities: La Llorona; Sihuanaba; Headless priest

Origin
- First attested: 1995; 31 years ago
- Country: Puerto Rico; Mexico
- Region: Caribbean (chiefly Puerto Rico); Central America; South America; North America (chiefly Mexico and the Southwestern United States)

The chupacabra or chupacabras (Spanish pronunciation: [tʃupaˈkaβɾas], literally meaning 'goat-sucker', from Spanish: chupa, 'sucks', and cabras, 'goats') is a legendary creature, or cryptid, in the folklore of parts of the Americas. It is said to prey on livestock, particularly goats, although reports also attribute attacks to sheep, chickens and other domesticated animals. According to accounts, the chupacabra kills its victims by puncturing the neck and consuming their blood, a characteristic that gave rise to its enduring association with vampirism.

Descriptions of the creature vary considerably by region. In Puerto Rico and much of Hispanic America, it is commonly portrayed as reptilian or extraterrestrial-looking, about the size of a small bear, and with a distinctive row of spines extending from the neck to the base of the tail. In contrast, reports from the Southwestern United States typically describe the creature as a hairless, canine animal with pronounced fangs.

The first widely publicized sightings and descriptions of the chupacabra emerged in Puerto Rico in 1995. Since then, alleged encounters have been reported throughout the Americas, ranging from Maine to Chile, as well as in countries outside the region, including Russia and the Philippines. However, these reports remain anecdotal and have not been supported by verifiable evidence. Investigations of purported sightings in northern Mexico and the Southern United States have instead identified the animals involved as canids afflicted by severe mange.

== Name ==
The name Chupacabras literally translates to 'goat-sucker', deriving from the Spanish words chupar ('to suck') and cabras ('goats'). Both chupacabras and chupacabra are used throughout the Americas; the former is the original Spanish term, while the latter emerged later as a regularized singular form. The name is generally attributed to Puerto Rican comedian Silverio Pérez, who coined the term in 1995 while discussing the reported livestock attacks during his radio program in San Juan.

== History ==
In 1975, a series of unexplained livestock deaths in the municipality of Moca, Puerto Rico, came to be attributed to a mysterious entity dubbed el vampiro de Moca ('the vampire of Moca'). Authorities and local residents initially suspected the killings to be the work of a Satanic cult; similar cases were subsequently reported elsewhere on the island. Contemporary accounts described the affected animals as bearing small, circular puncture wounds and appearing to have been drained of blood.

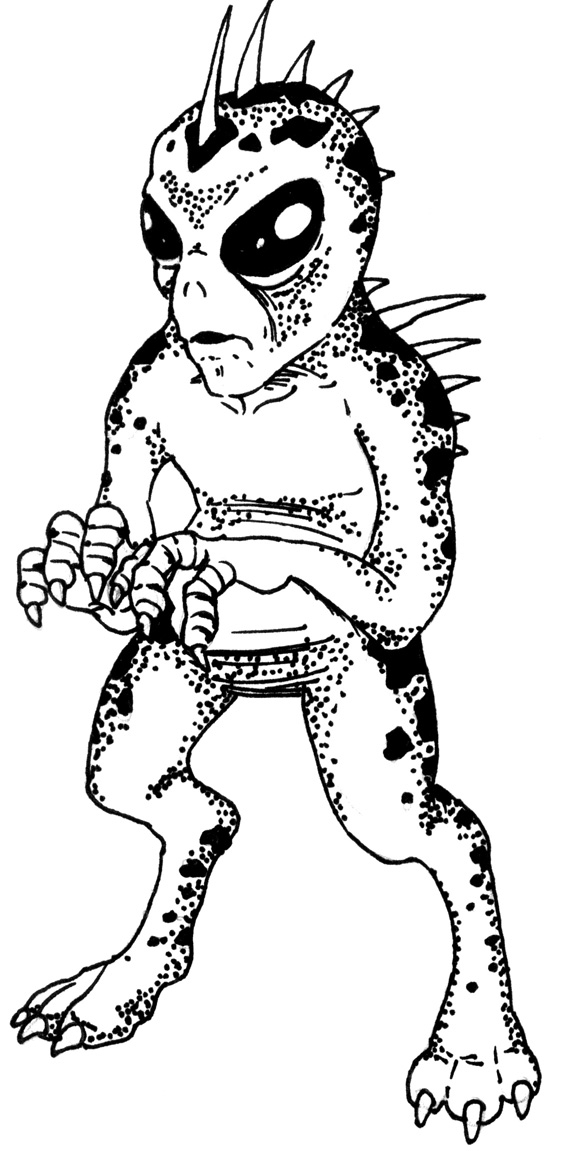
Graphic depiction of chupacabra, as described by Puerto Rican witnesses in 1995

The first reported attack later associated with the chupacabras phenomenon occurred in Puerto Rico in March 1995. Eight sheep were found dead, each reportedly bearing three puncture wounds to the chest and alleged to have been completely drained of blood. Several months later, in August, a resident named Madelyne Tolentino reported a sighting of the creature in the municipality of Canóvanas. The incident coincided with a series of livestock and pet deaths in the area, with accounts claiming that as many as 150 animals were killed.

Puerto Rican comedian and entrepreneur Silverio Pérez is credited with coining the term chupacabras soon after the first incidents were reported in the press. Shortly after the first reported incidents in Puerto Rico, other animal deaths were reported in other countries, such as Argentina, Bolivia, Brazil, Chile, Colombia, Dominican Republic, El Salvador, Honduras, Mexico, Nicaragua, Panama, Peru, and the United States.

Reports of alleged sightings of the creature proliferated in the mid-1990s in various locations. In Nayarit, dozens of mutilated animals began to appear, as well as in other parts of Mexico, the southwestern United States and in China. The first reports from Puerto Rico numbered more than 200 in 1995.

In April 2000, in the mining city of Calama in northern Chile, approximately one hundred farm animals were reportedly found drained of blood or mutilated under unusual circumstances. Reports of similar incidents continued to emerge in the area until the end of 2002. Soon afterward, sensationalist media outlets began reporting complaints from other parts of the country, although none of the alleged incidents produced evidence of an extraordinary or unidentified cause. In one case, a farmer killed a güiña (Leopardus guigna), an incident that attracted international attention, while in a separate case the fetus of a monito del monte (Dromiciops gliroides) was reportedly mistaken for the creature. An urban legend subsequently emerged claiming that a purported NASA mission had arrived in the country to investigate the phenomenon. Analysis of the physical evidence, including footprints and hair, supported this conclusion: “Both the footprints and hair indicated they were domestic dogs.”

During the first half of 2002, reports of mutilated cattle emerged from several areas of Argentina, in the region between the provinces of Río Negro and Santa Fe. Although the animals suffered the removal of reproductive organs, the cases were widely associated by the media with the chupacabra phenomenon or with alleged satanic ritual practices. Shortly thereafter, the Servicio Nacional de Sanidad y Calidad Agroalimentaria (SENASA) concluded that the mutilations had been carried out by foxes or hocicudo rats.

In July 2004, a rancher killed a creature resembling a hairless dog, which he discovered attacking his livestock near San Antonio, Texas. The animal, initially named the Elmendorf Beast, was later identified as a coyote with sarcoptic mange after its DNA was examined by the University of California, Davis. In October of that same year, two more carcasses were found in the same area. Biologists in Texas examined samples from both carcasses and determined that they were also coyotes suffering from very severe cases of mange.

In Coleman County, Texas, a farmer named Reggie Lagow captured an animal using a trap he had set after some of his poultry were found dead. The animal's appearance was described as a mixture of hairless dog, rat and kangaroo. Lagow made the animal available to Texas parks and wildlife officials for identification, although he later stated in an interview with John Adolfi that he had disposed of the creature two days after finding it.

In mid-August 2006, a woman named Michelle O'Donnell, from Maine, photographed a strange animal by a roadside. O'Donnell recalled having seen the same animal near her home a week earlier, and her husband described it as a mixture between a rodent and a canid. The animal had apparently been struck by a car and was not identifiable. It was originally reported that the carcass had been destroyed by vultures before experts could examine it, but later wildlife officials were able to obtain a DNA sample, determining that it was a hybrid of wolf and dog.

In August 2007, a woman named Phylis Canion was informed of the discovery of the remains of a strange-looking animal in Cuero, Texas, outside the property of a neighbor. Canion had spent the previous weeks attempting to photograph or film a supposed strange creature she believed responsible for the deaths of around 30 of her chickens over several years. Canion also claimed to have seen three creatures similar to the remains discovered. After photographing the remains, Canion contacted a taxidermist to preserve the creature, which she later began displaying in her home. After the story gained national attention, experts from Texas State University–San Marcos offered to conduct DNA testing. The analysis identified the creature as a coyote. Unsatisfied, Canion contacted experts at the University of California, Davis for a second analysis, which determined that the creature was specifically a hybrid: a cross between a coyote and a Mexican wolf. According to scientists and wildlife specialists, this hybrid is not unknown and has been studied before. The unusual appearance of the animal is believed to have been caused by mange, which may explain its grayish-blue skin.

The town of Cuero would again be the setting for another sighting a year later, in August 2008, when Brandon Riedel, a deputy sheriff of DeWitt County, filmed an unidentified animal in alleyways using his patrol car dashboard camera. The animal was the size of a coyote but hairless, with a long snout, short front legs, and long hind legs. Sheriff Jode Zavesky suspected it was the same type of coyote identified in 2007.

In September 2009, CNN broadcast a video showing a close-up of an unidentified dead animal. Local speculation suggested it might be a chupacabra. A taxidermist in Blanco County, Texas stated that the animal was likely a genetically mutated coyote.

In July 2010, animal control officers reportedly shot and killed a supposed chupacabra in Hood County, Texas. Scientists from Texas A&M University later identified it as a coyote–dog hybrid with signs of mange and internal parasites.

On 18 December 2010, in Nelson County, Kentucky, a man named Mark Cothren shot and killed an unrecognizable animal. Numerous photographs were taken, and the story was widely reported. The animal was described as having long ears, whiskers, a long tail, and being the size of a domestic cat. It was reportedly submitted for analysis.

On 4 July 2011, Jack Crabtree of Lake Jackson, Texas reported seeing a supposed chupacabra in his backyard. He later accepted expert explanations that it was likely a coyote with mange.

In September 2013, a family in Rosario, Santa Fe Province, Argentina, presented the body of a small unidentified animal found in Vera. It was later identified as a naturally mummified cat.

In September 2013, reports in St. Louis, Missouri, were attributed to a dog with mange.

On 23 February 2014, a Texas couple claimed to have shot and killed a chupacabra; wildlife experts attributed the animal to known mammals affected by mange.

On 3 April 2014, another Texas couple claimed to have captured a chupacabra in Ratcliff, Texas. Benjamin Radford suggested it was likely a raccoon affected by sarcoptic mange.

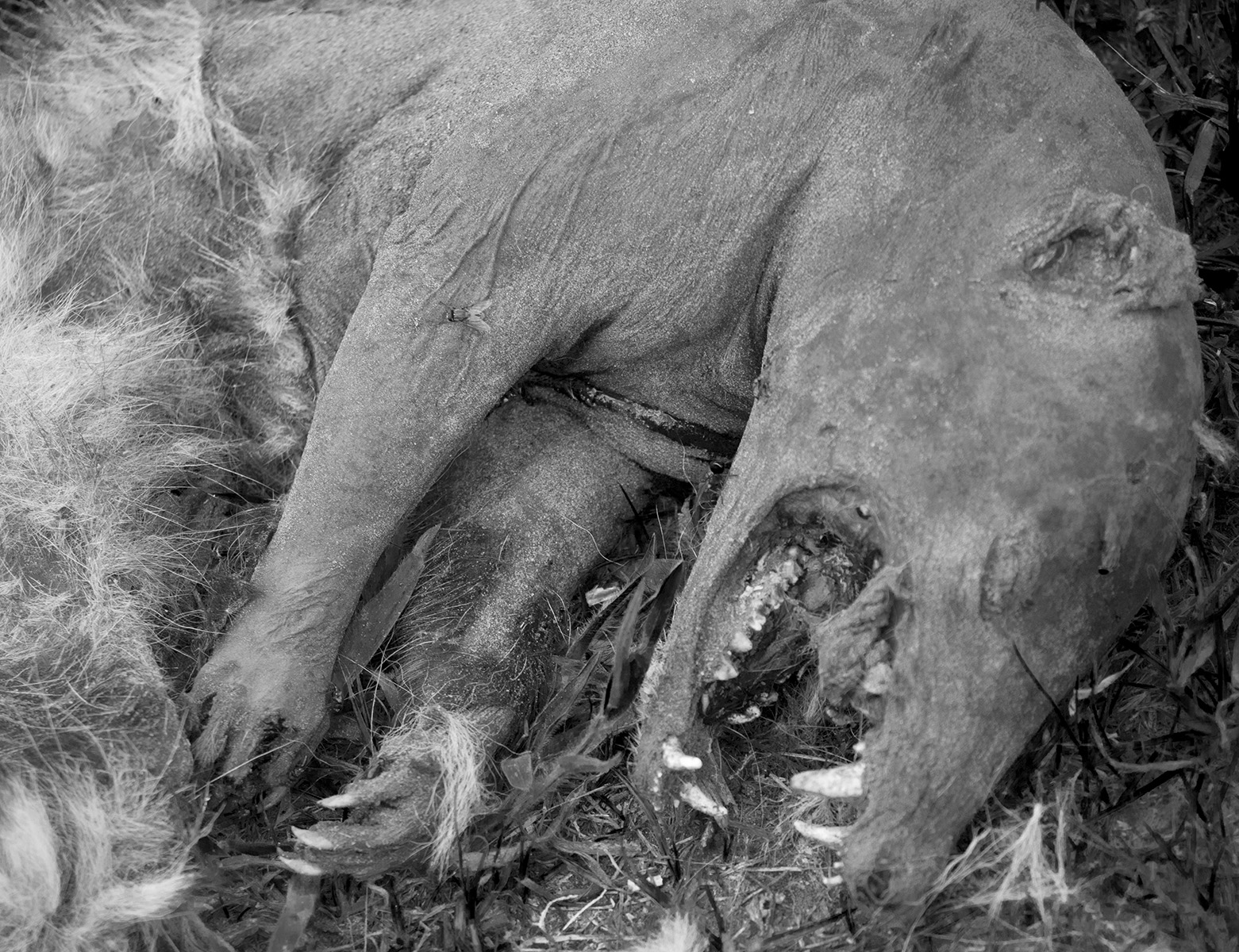
Alleged chupacabra found on State Road 72 in Florida in 2020. According to sceptics, it merely shows a dead coyote with scabies

In 2019 a video recorded by Mundo Ovni showed the results of a supposed attack on chickens in the Seburuquillo sector of Lares, Puerto Rico.

== Reputed origin ==
A five-year investigation by Benjamin Radford, documented in his 2011 book Tracking the Chupacabra, concluded that the description given by the original eyewitness in Puerto Rico, Madelyne Tolentino, was based on the creature Sil in the 1995 science-fiction horror film Species. The alien creature Sil is nearly identical to Tolentino's chupacabra eyewitness account and she had seen the movie before her report: "It was a creature that looked like the chupacabra, with spines on its back and all... The resemblance to the chupacabra was really impressive", Tolentino reported. Radford revealed that Tolentino "believed that the creatures and events she saw in Species were happening in reality in Puerto Rico at the time", and therefore concludes that "the most important chupacabra description cannot be trusted". This, Radford believes, seriously undermines the credibility of the chupacabra as a real animal.

The reports of blood-sucking by the chupacabra were never confirmed by a necropsy, the only way to conclude that the animal was drained of blood. Dr. David Morales, a Puerto Rican veterinarian with the Department of Agriculture, analyzed 300 reported victims of the chupacabra and found that they had not been bled dry.

Radford divided the chupacabra reports into two categories: the reports from Puerto Rico and Latin America, where animals were attacked and it is supposed their blood was extracted; and the reports in the United States of mammals, mostly dogs and coyotes with mange, that people call "chupacabra" due to their unusual appearance.

In 2010, University of Michigan biologist Barry O'Connor concluded that all the chupacabra reports in the United States were simply coyotes infected with the parasite Sarcoptes scabiei, whose symptoms would explain most of the features of the chupacabra: they would be left with little fur, thickened skin, and a rank odor. O'Connor theorized that the attacks on goats occurred "because these animals are greatly weakened, [so] they're going to have a hard time hunting. So they may be forced into attacking livestock because it's easier than running down a rabbit or a deer." Both dogs and coyotes can kill and not consume the prey, either because they are inexperienced, or due to injury or difficulty in killing the prey. The prey can survive the attack and die afterwards from internal bleeding or circulatory shock. The presence of two holes in the neck, corresponding with the canine teeth, are to be expected since this is the only way that most land carnivores have to catch their prey. There are reports of stray Mexican hairless dogs being mistaken for chupacabras.

== Appearance ==
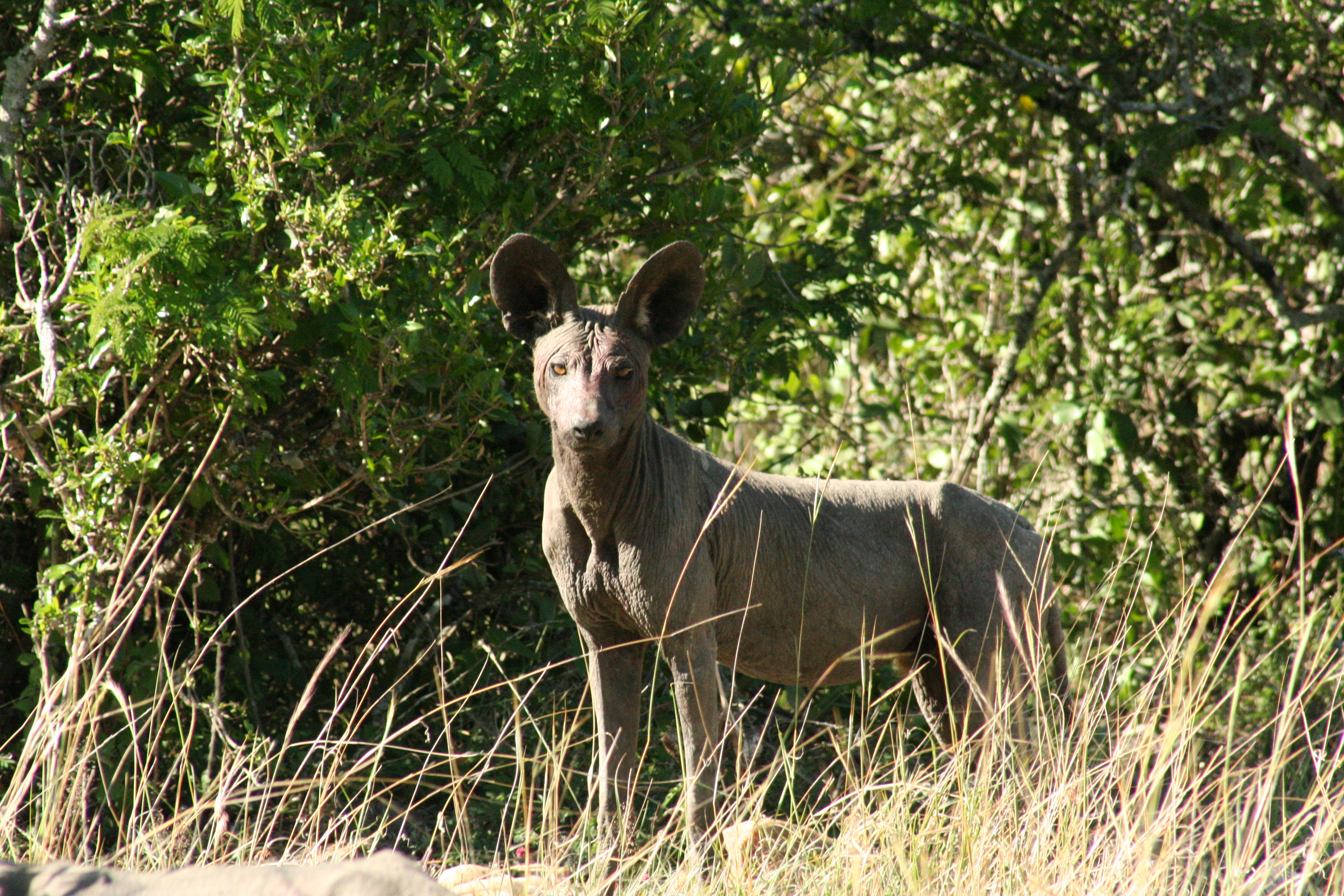
Mange can often greatly alter the expected appearance of an animal. Wild and domestic canines with severe cases of mange have been proposed as explanations for the chupacabra.

The most common description of the chupacabra is that of a reptile-like creature with leathery or scaly greenish-gray skin and a row of sharp spines or quills extending along its back. It is described as approximately 3 to 4 feet (0.9 to 1.2 m) tall and capable of standing and hopping in a manner resembling a kangaroo. This depiction was characteristic of the few Puerto Rican reports of alleged sightings in 1995, with similar accounts emerging from parts of Chile and Argentina.

Another common portrayal of the chupacabra is as an unusual breed of wild dog. This form is typically described as mostly hairless with a pronounced spinal ridge, prominent eye sockets, fangs, and claws. Accounts of this type began emerging in the early 2000s, initially from areas extending northward from the Yucatán Peninsula and northern Mexico, before spreading into the United States. It subsequently become the predominant depiction of the chupacabra. Unlike conventional predators, the creature is said to drain the blood, and sometimes consume the organs of its victims, typically through three puncture wounds arranged in a downwards-pointing triangle, although some accounts describe only one or two wounds.

== Plausibility of existence ==
The chupacabra panic first started in late 1995, Puerto Rico: farmers were mass reporting the mysterious killings of various livestock. In these reports, the farmers recalled two puncture wounds on the animal carcasses. Chupacabra killings were soon associated with a seemingly untouched animal carcass other than puncture wounds which were said to be used to suck the blood out of the victim. Reports of such killings began to spread around and eventually out of the country, reaching areas such as Mexico, Brazil, Chile, and the Southern area of the United States.

Most notably, these areas experience frequent, and extreme dry seasons; in the cases of the Puerto Rican reports of 1995 and the Mexican reports of 1996, both countries were currently experiencing or dealing with the aftermath of severe droughts. Investigations carried out in both countries at this time noted a certain dramatic violence in these killings. These environmental conditions could provide a simple explanation for the livestock killings: wild predators losing their usual prey to the drought, therefore being forced to hunt the livestock of farmers for sustenance. Thus, the same theory can be applied to many of the other "chupacabra" attacks: that the dry weather had created a more competitive environment for native predators, leading them to prey on livestock to survive. Such an idea can also explain the increased violence in the killings; hungry and desperate predators are driven to hunt livestock to avoid starvation, causing an increase in both the number of livestock killings, and the viciousness of each one.

Evidence of such is provided in page 179 of Benjamin Radford's book, Tracking the Chupacabra: The Vampire Beast in Fact, Fiction, and Folklore. Radford's chart highlights ten significant reports of chupacabra attacks, seven of which had a carcass recovered and examined; these autopsies concluded the causes of death as various animal attacks, as displayed though the animal DNA found on the carcasses. Radford provides further evidence in pages 161-162 of his book, displaying animals who are proven to have fallen victim to regular coyote attacks; thus, explaining that it is not unusual for an animal carcass to be left uneaten while only displaying puncture wounds and/or minimal signs of attack.

The plausibility of the chupacabra's existence is also discredited by the varying descriptions of the creature. Depending on the reported sighting, the creature is described with thick skin or fur, wings or no wings, a long tail or no tail, is bat-like, dog-like, or even alien-like. Evidently, the chupacabra has a wide variety of descriptions; to the point where it is hard to believe that all the sightings are of the same creature. A very likely explanation for this phenomenon is that individuals who had heard of the newly popular chupacabra had the creature's name fresh in their mind before they happened to see a strange looking animal. They then resort to make sense of their encounter by labelling it as the recently "discovered" monster, instead of a more realistic explanation. For example, some scientists hypothesize that what many believe to be a chupacabra is a wild or domestic dog affected by mange, a disease causing a thick buildup of skin and hair loss.

== Related legends ==
The "Ozark Howler", a large bear-like animal, is the subject of a similar legend.

The Peuchens of Chile also share similarities in their supposed habits, but instead of being dog-like they are described as winged snakes. This legend may have originated from the vampire bat, an animal endemic to the region.

In the Philippines, another legendary creature called the sigbin shares many of the features in descriptions of the chupacabra. The discovery of a cat-fox in Southeast Asia suggests that sightings of this creature could be attributed to this animal, which remained undiscovered for a long time.

In 2018 there were reports of suspected chupacabras in Manipur, India. Many domestic animals and poultry were killed in a manner similar to other chupacabra attacks, and several people reported that they had seen creatures. Forensic experts opined that street dogs were responsible for mass killing of domestic animals and poultry after studying the remnants of a corpse.
