= Mysterious New Mexico =

2014 book by Benjamin Radford

- Cover
- Author: Ben Radford
- Cover artist: Joshua Hoffine
- Language: English
- Subject: Paranormal investigation
- Publisher: University of New Mexico Press
- Publication date: 2014
- Media type: Print (Paperback)
- Pages: 300
- ISBN: 978-0-8263-5450-1

Mysterious New Mexico: Miracles, Magic, and Monsters in the Land of Enchantment is a 2014 collection of thirteen investigations conducted by author Ben Radford into cases involving claims of the paranormal occurring in or with significant connections to New Mexico.

== Overview ==
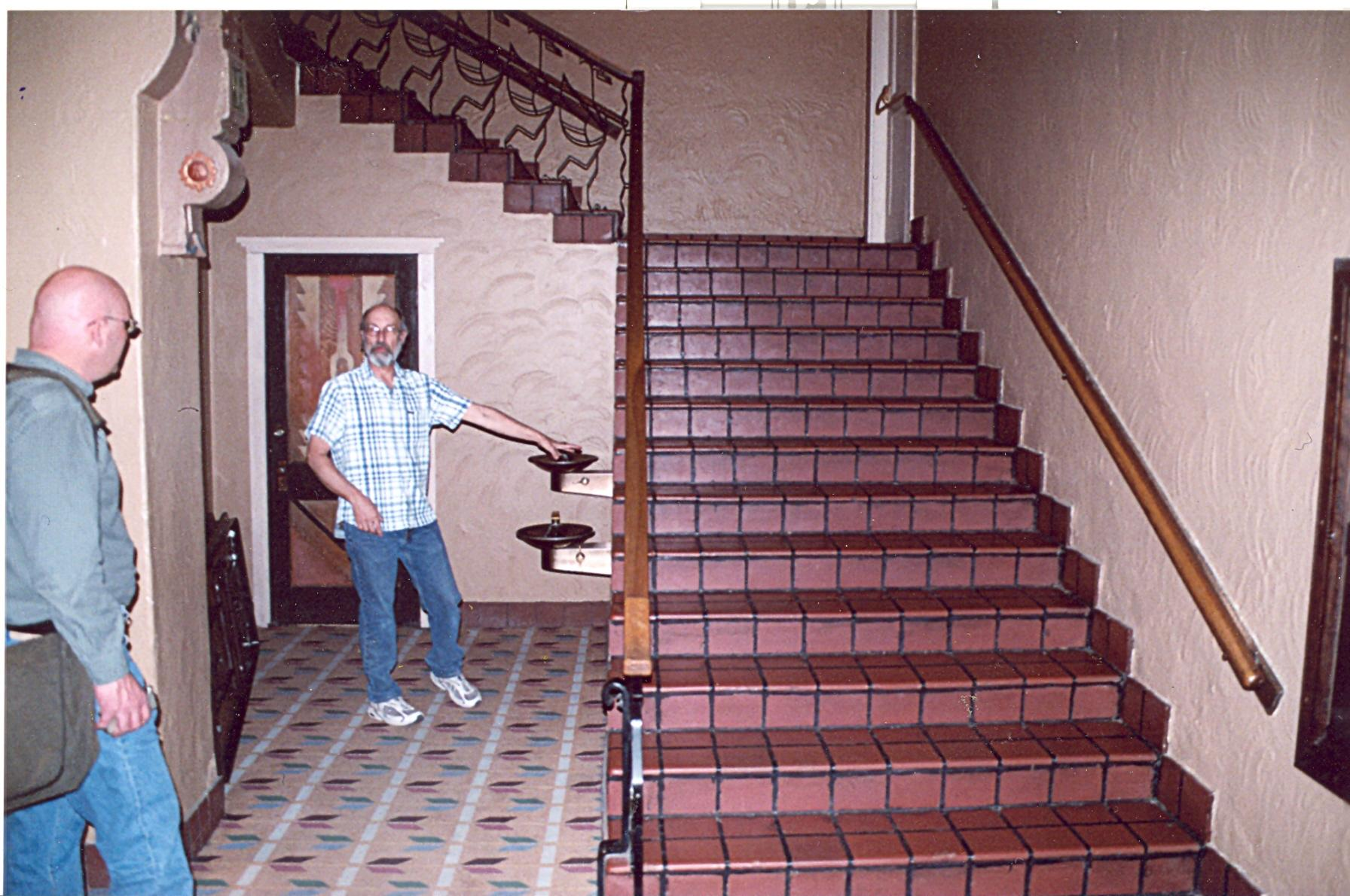
KiMo technician Dennis Potter shows investigator Benjamin Radford the site of a 1951 explosion which spurred a ghost story.

This book describes the author's use of scientific techniques to investigate thirteen cases of purported paranormal phenomena. Interviews were conducted with people connected to the events and places involved in the legends surrounding the KiMo Theater, El Santuario de Chimayo, the crystal skull found in the San Luis Valley, and the hot springs of Ojo Caliente. The case of the West Mesa murders is the backdrop for a series of interviews with psychic detectives who claim the ability to help police solve such crimes. Other cases required more literary and historical research, such as the Aztec UFO Crash, The Loretto Chapel's Staircase, reports of sightings of the legendary Thunderbirds, the apparition known as La Llorona, and Santa Fe's La Posada Hotel. The basic elements of the story of La Llorona, a legend usually associated with the Hispanic culture, for example, are traced back to a German folktale from 1486. Practical experiments were required for a third group, including determining the origin of The Santa Fe Courthouse Ghost, the reports of hauntings at the Old Cuchillo Bar, and an investigation into the power of labyrinths. The author also places the stories in their cultural context and points out the commonalities shared by the folklore and legends of the supernatural across cultures. Radford characterizes the work done for this book as "taking the claims seriously and offering serious investigation."

== Reception ==
=== Press coverage and reviews ===
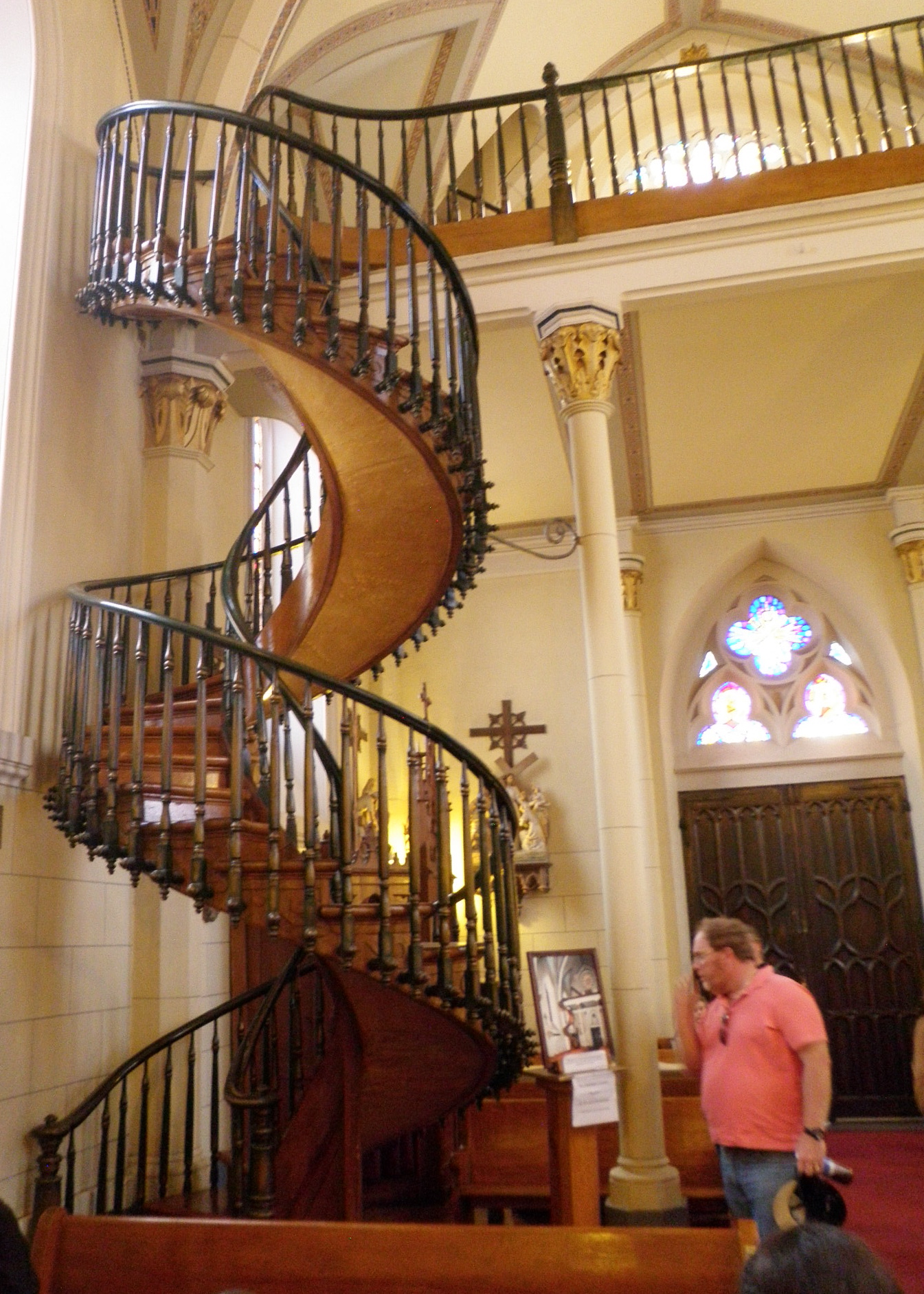
The miracle staircase in Santa Fe's Loretto Chapel

Two of the investigations recounted in this book received press coverage before its publication. The Albuquerque Journal covered Radford's investigation of the KiMo Theater in 2009. Both television station KRQE and USA Today reported on Radford's experiments to identify the cause of the images widely known as the Santa Fe Courthouse Ghost in 2007.

In an article for the "Pasatiempo" section of the Santa Fe New Mexican, Robert Nott interviewed Radford about his investigative methods and the psychology behind belief in supernatural phenomena. Regarding the book, Nott wrote, "Using both forensic techniques and journalistic inquiry, Radford makes a pretty good case that La Posada de Santa Fe is not haunted by the ghost of Julia Staab, that a little spirit boy named Bobby does not haunt Albuquerque’s KiMo Theatre, that the Miraculous Staircase in Loretto Chapel isn’t that miraculous, and that La Llorona is nothing more than a rural legend."

A reviewer for the Cibola Beacon was impressed with the author's scholarly research, citing the "17 references in the 21 pages devoted to the worldwide phenomenon known as 'La Llorona,'" a "five-page index," and, "copious references at the end of each chapter."

Skeptical writer and podcast host Susan Gerbic wrote, "You can almost see how he is thinking this through, how best to investigate it. Where are the actual claims that can be tested, researched? Then once he has done that he leads us through the investigative process." She later added, "the importance of original research—going back to the first source [as Radford does] and not relying on secondhand (and more likely fifthhand) stories—cannot be stressed strongly enough."

In October 2014, Lesley Anderson of Fast Company wrote an article profiling both the author and his investigative techniques in the case of the Santa Fe Courthouse Ghost.

=== Awards ===
- Finalist for New Mexico Book Co-op's 2015 New Mexico-Arizona Book Awards in the "Nonfiction – other" category.
- 2015 Border Regional Library Association's Southwest Book Award.
- 2015 Southwest Book Design Award from the New Mexico Book Association.
- 2015 Silver Winner of PubWest Book Design Awards for Adult Trade Book, Non-Illustrated
