= Playing Gods =

Boardgame

Playing Gods is a satirical board game released in late 2008. Two to five players each represent a different god, and compete with each other to take over the world. This is done by spreading believers, converting the followers of other gods, or killing them off with Acts of God. The game premiered at the 2009 New York Toy Fair.

== Concept and gameplay ==
Playing Gods combines literate satire and social commentary with the carefree fun of the Old Testament. Players can pit Christians against Muslims and Hindus against Jews, or be the mascot, a machine-gun-toting Buddha. Players may choose to be any god from Jesus to the Buddha, from Cthulhu to Zeus, from the Cult of Oprah to the Almighty Dollar.

Playing Gods is basically an area control game, like Risk. The board is a map of the world, and each continent contains a Holy City that is home of one of the world's religions. Circling the globe is an outer ring where the god pawns move around the board. They do not actually move onto the map of the Earth, they stay above in the heavens, gathering power through Wrath and Conversion cards. Wrath cards (also called "kill cards") are used to bring down natural disasters (plagues, locusts, avalanches, floods, and other Acts of Gods) on other gods' followers. Conversion cards are used to convert other gods' followers to your beliefs (promising them things like Afterlife, Prosperity, and Miracles).

Typical card content includes: "Bring down the plague: Kill two sects," "Your preacher is found with a prostitute, lose one sect," and "Another god's follower challenges you to prove you exist; you fry him with lightning in front of a crowd. Gain one sect." The game is won when one god converts or kills off all the other gods' followers.

== Gods represented in the game ==
Figures from the world's five major religions are included in the game: Christianity, Buddhism, Islam, Hinduism, and Judaism. A sticker sheet is provided with the game to allow for other gods and religions, including Scientology (represented by Tom Cruise with a UFO over his head), Zeus, Jehovah's Witnesses, beer, the Cult of Oprah, the Almighty Dollar, war, J. R. "Bob" Dobbs (of the Church of the Subgenius), the Flying Spaghetti Monster, death, Satan, television, the Goddess, atheism, the Magic 8 Ball, McWorld (American consumerism), and others. Players are encouraged to create their own gods.

== History and development ==
The game was introduced in September 2008 at Dragon*Con, the annual fantasy and science fiction convention in Atlanta. The game is produced by an independent company called Balls Out Entertainment, which, according to its Web site, "is an undisputed world leader in edgy fun, satirical entertainment, and pompous hyperbole. Formed just recently yet dating back to Caesar, Balls Out Entertainment is at once both new and improved."

According to the game's creator, Ben Radford, the game was partly inspired by a British game called War on Terror: The Board Game. The concept for "the world's first satirical board game of religious warfare" was inspired by his realization that "many of the world's worst conflicts are rooted in religion. Lots of people believe that God is on their side, and as long as God is on your side, any actions you take are justified... I realized, 'This is ridiculous, all these people killing each other because their neighbor down the road prays to a different god.'" Radford said. "I wanted to address this religious violence from a satirical angle, as I'd never seen it done before."

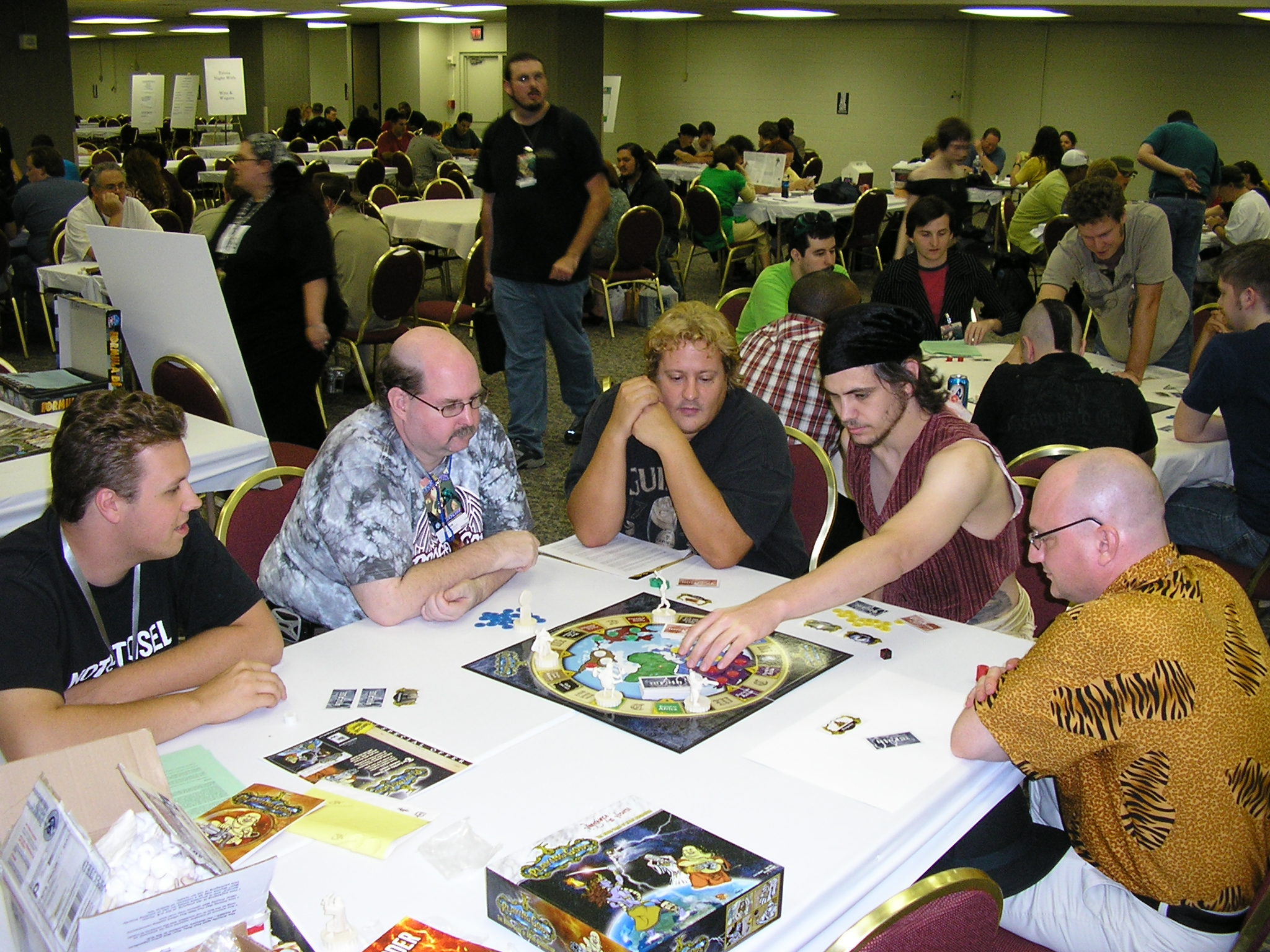
Dragon*Con premiere Atlanta 2008

== Reception ==
The public's reaction to Playing Gods has been generally positive. Australia's Synergy Magazine reported Playing Gods has “some of the nicest pawns I have ever seen in a board game... has great game play and comes with a smart, cynical and satirical tone. The Wrath and Conversion cards are amusing but also make you think about the inherent violence in religion and superstition… Playing Gods is blasphemy with style and offers a great board game with a good dose of insight and a great load of fun!”. Other players have praised the game as "one of the coolest and most important things to happen to parlor games", and “awesome, and damned funny.. it’s Candyland for people who want the express train to hell”.

Users of the boardgaming community BoardGameGeek have praised the humor in the game, but gave it a poor average rating due to its boring gameplay and lack of meaningful decisions.

The game's main theme—gods killing off each other's believers in religious warfare—has caused some controversy. The game comes with six pawns, including ones depicting Jesus swinging a cross as a weapon and the Buddha firing a machine gun. Several stores have refused to carry the game because of its potential to offend religious people.

USA Today polled its readers about the controversy "Does Playing Gods go too far?" The results were split down the middle, with 48% saying it went too far, and 50% saying it didn't go far enough. Carl Raschke, professor of religious studies at University of Denver, stated that the game's perspective "has no basis in historical reality and doesn't actually represent any religion. It just appeals to people who hate religion to begin with—the hip subculture of militant popular atheists... . It sounds too stupid to go far."
