= Tracking the Chupacabra =

Book by Benjamin Radford

Tracking the Chupacabra: The Vampire Beast in Fact, Fiction and Folklore
- Author: Benjamin Radford
- Language: English
- Subject: Chupacabras
- Publisher: University of New Mexico Press
- Publication date: 15 March 2011
- Publication place: United States
- Pages: 202
- Awards: 2011 New Mexico Book Award Finalist; ForeWord Review Book of the Year Award Finalist
- ISBN: 9780826350152
- OCLC: 671237313
- LC Class: QL89.2.C57R34

Tracking the Chupacabra: The Vampire Beast in Fact, Fiction and Folklore is a non-fiction book by Benjamin Radford, an American writer and investigator. The book documents Radford's five-year investigation into accounts of the chupacabra. The chupacabra is said to be a vampiric predatory animal that drains the blood of animal victims while avoiding human detection.

== Overview ==
The author, Benjamin Radford, attempts to solve the mystery of the chupacabra, including whether it is a legend or real animal, what its physical and behavior characteristics are, its origin and connection to folklore, and what exactly is happening to the animals reported to be its victims.

Tracking the Chupacabra documents Radford's five-year investigation, including his travels into the mysteries surrounding the chupacabra. It also includes his research, with interviews and documentation collected during this process.

Opening with "The Goatsucker Mystery," Radford introduced the essential portions of the chupacabra legend and its different versions, comparing the creatures' characteristics with another, Bigfoot, which he writes is known for leaving large footprints. In his overview Radford summarized theories concerning the origin of the chupacabra, some paranormal or religious in nature, and interviewed several cryptozoologists.

In "A Brief history of Vampires," Radford wrote about common themes of vampire folklore. While exploring 18th-century accounts of European vampires, Radford notes that reports of vampire predation are used to explain otherwise unexplained misfortunes, such as disease, malnutrition, or loss of livestock.

"Chupacabras in Popular Culture" described how, in Radford's view, the legend grew in Puerto Rico from observations by locals of apparent animal predations into rumors of a mysterious creature that was responsible. According to Radford, the news media leapt to conclusions, which, in his opinion, further drove alleged sightings and reports, to the extent that "any odd event" was attributed to the chupacabra.

The chapter "Searching for Chupacabras in Nicaragua" deals with Radford's investigation in Nicaragua near the Río San Juan, where one of the best known alleged chupacabra remains had been discovered. While performing a physical search for the animal, Radford interviewed local experts, such as guide Fernando Casanova of Nicaragua's Indio Maiz Biological Reserve, about the local understanding of the chupacabra's "character or description," as well as examining tracks found in the area and comparing them to casts reportedly taken from scenes surrounding chupacabra victims.

In "The Dead Vampires Speak: Chupacabra Carcasses," Radford discussed the analyses of various recovered corpses put forward as candidates for identification of the chupacabra animal. "The Curious Case of the Cuero Chupacabra" covers the analysis of a carcass of the American canid version of the chupacabra, discovered by a rancher in Cuero, Texas. The chapter also discusses Radford's participation in an episode of MonsterQuest, which aired in 2008 during the series' second season. Having analyzed the various forms of chupacabra remains and reports, in "Reconsidering the Goatsucker," Radford attempted to determine the origins of the chupacabra creature.

Radford concluded his investigation with the chapter "The Zoology of Chupacabras and the Science of Vampires." Compiling reports of researchers who examined victims of animal predation in apparent chupacabra attacks, Radford noted that the reports' claims that the animals had been exsanguinated were inaccurate. The apparent loss of blood could be explained by internal hemorrhaging and pooling of blood at the bottom of the corpse. The attribution of the attacks on livestock to a vampiric entity can be explained by the puncture wounds resulting from the canine teeth left by most predators, who often instinctively go for the neck, according to taxidermist Jerry Ayer. Radford attributes much of the spread of chupacabra sightings to factors including the mass media (especially the Internet and television shows), eyewitness misperceptions, ignorance of forensic science, social contagion, and mass hysteria, and concludes that "every supposedly mysterious detail of the bloodsucking 'monster-thing' and its victims was explained."

== Reception ==
Matt Crowley, reviewing the book for The Skeptical Inquirer in July 2011, recapped Radford's process of tracing the origins of reported chupacabra sightings, tracking the changing physical attributes of the creature based on its description as reports journeyed from Puerto Rico eventually traveling to the United States. Crowley praised what he described as the "elegance" of Radford's investigation, stating that it "lies in the process of the proof, not just the result."

Reviewing Tracking the Chupacabra for Library Journal, Janet Tapper described Radford as "thorough in his investigation; interviewing witnesses, providing creepy photographs of otherworldly creatures, serving up DNA analysis, and contemplating theories of mass psychosis." Tapper recommended the work, stating "this objective probe will appeal to readers interested in exploring and exploding modern mysteries."

Reviewing the book for the Journal of Folklore Research, Memorial University of Newfoundland's Virginia Fugarino stated that "to date, few books have been dedicated to taking a serious look at this creature," and commented on Radford's treatment of folklore, saying "he particularly explores how the chupacabra and other Latin American vampiric creatures can be seen to represent metaphorically postcolonial concerns and resentment of intrusion from outside political forces, specifically the U.S. government." While criticizing Radford for what Fugarino states is an "at times [...] dismissive tone toward individuals who believe in the creature," she stated that the work was "clear and well presented."

The American Folklore Society invited Radford to speak at its 2011 Annual Meeting, where he presented an abstract, "The Chupacabra and Folklore." At the same meeting, Radford participated in a panel on "Fairy Animals, Demonic Beasts and Fantastic Creatures in International Tradition I."

Cryptozoologist Karl Shuker performed a review of Radford's work in a March 2012 issue of Fortean Times, stating that "the chupacabra has met its match," recommending the book's "scientific detachment and common sense" for readers looking for those traits.

In a review for Aztlán, an interdisciplinary journal of Chicano studies published by the University of California, Los Angeles, San Diego State University's William A. Nericcio wrote that "the power of Radford's work is the depth of his research." Nericcio went on to discuss the impact of Radford's investigation on the dialogue regarding the cultural impact of the chupacabra in the Latin American community. According to Nericcio, "the rise of evangelical churches in Latin America and the American Southwest [...] coincides with sightings of the chupacabra and the virus-like spread of its mythology," referring to the perceived connection by some proponents between the chupacabra and satanic or occult phenomena.

A reviewer for The Latin Americanist, the University of Oklahoma's J. Justin Castro noted that chupacabra reports have "captured the imagination of people around the world," and praised Radford's "insightful and entertaining book," stating that "Radford sets the record straight, debunking many of the myths about the goatsucker." While Castro criticized some of Radford's arguments concerning feelings of U.S. exploitation of Puerto Rico as "largely unfounded," Castro stated that "His concluding arguments, on the other hand, are more viable. He makes a strong case that cinema greatly influenced the chupacabra phenomenon."

Tim Hull, in Tucson Weekly, stated that "Radford's most interesting revelations are about the psychological and sociopolitical structures behind the folklore, especially as they relate to the monster's origins in Puerto Rico, where some people believe that the chupacabra is a secret U.S. government experiment gone wrong." Hull also went on to say that "While Radford's book—which is well-written and a fun read—should be the last word on the chupacabra's real-world existence, it won't be. As the author points out, the beast has entered the realm of conspiracy, where no amount of evidence, or logic, can sway the true believer."

Jay Koester, in El Paso Times, called Radford's book "[...] an enjoyable ride." Koester also went on to say that "The legend doesn't hold up well under Radford's scientific microscope, but the curious will still love this tour through the tall tales."

Rosanne Boyett, in the Cibola County Beacon, stated that "Radford questions documented reports and the resulting conclusions. But the author’s criticisms leave him vulnerable to accusations of racial prejudice, particularly the references to eyewitnesses’ reports."

The staff at Fate magazine stated that "[...] Tracking the Chupacabra is by no means another collection of witness accounts and unsubstantiated facts. The author has not only gone on an expedition to find the elusive beast (complete with all the expected disappointment) but has researched just about every reported Chupacabra encounter with the journalistic zeal of Woodward and Bernstein."

In a review for The Skeptics Society, Sharon A. Hill called the book "[...] satisfying for those willing to consider a legitimate, evidence-based explanation." Hill went on to say that "I’m hard pressed to find any stone unturned in this stunning exposé of the first Internet-age cryptid."

== Awards and nominations ==
- 2011 – New Mexico Book Award Finalist
- 2011 – ForeWord Review Book of the Year Award Finalist

== Publication ==
- Radford, Benjamin (15 March 2011). Tracking the Chupacabra: the Vampire Beast in Fact, Fiction and Folklore. University of New Mexico Press. ISBN 9780826350152.
