= 50 Reasons People Give for Believing in a God =

Book by Guy P. Harrison

- Author: Guy P. Harrison
- Language: English
- Subject: Religion
- Publisher: Prometheus Books
- Publication date: 2008
- Publication place: United States
- Media type: paperback,
- Pages: 354
- ISBN: 978-1-59102-567-2

50 Reasons People Give for Believing in a God is a 2008 book by journalist Guy P. Harrison which examines fifty common reasons that believers across the world give for believing in a god or gods.

== Description ==
This is the first book by Harrison. It examines fifty common reasons that believers across the world give for believing in a god, drawing on his conversations with people while traveling both for business and pleasure in twenty years as a journalist.

Harrison notes that very few people are interested in the complex arguments that go on between theologians and atheists. The people he has talked with say they believe because that is what their parents taught them, and their parents would not lie to them, or because that is what it says in their book of wisdom.

Of the fifty reasons, Harrison concludes that the most common reasons people believe are because it is just obvious to them, because everyone is religious so it must be true, or because it brings them happiness.

Harrison describes Richard Dawkins' use of the term "faith heads" to describe believers as "a lot like an insult" and writes that it is "counterproductive."

== Reviews ==
According to a review in Patheos, Harrison discusses the reasons believers give for believing in God, doing so "succinctly and painlessly", and without insults. The review says that he does this in an unusually understandable way.

== See also ==
- The God Delusion
- Atheism: The Case Against God
- Breaking the Spell: Religion as a Natural Phenomenon
- The Future of an Illusion
