= Santa Fe courthouse ghost =

- Date: June 15, 2007
- Time: 7:27am MDT (1:27am UTC)
- Duration: Approximately 12 seconds
- Location: The First Judicial District Courthouse, Catron Street, Santa Fe, New Mexico, USA; 35.6908532°N 105.9410682°W
- Verdict: The ghost was found to be an insect crawling across the security camera lens
- Footage: What was it at the Santa Fe Courthouse? on YouTube

The Santa Fe courthouse ghost event was a purported ghost sighted on a video captured by a security camera at a courthouse in Santa Fe, New Mexico on June 15, 2007. Once the video was uploaded onto YouTube it quickly attracted widespread attention and many improbable suggestions as to its origin. Benjamin Radford, a managing editor of Skeptical Inquirer investigated the sighting and concluded that the origin of the ghost was a bug crawling across the camera lens.

== Details of the event ==
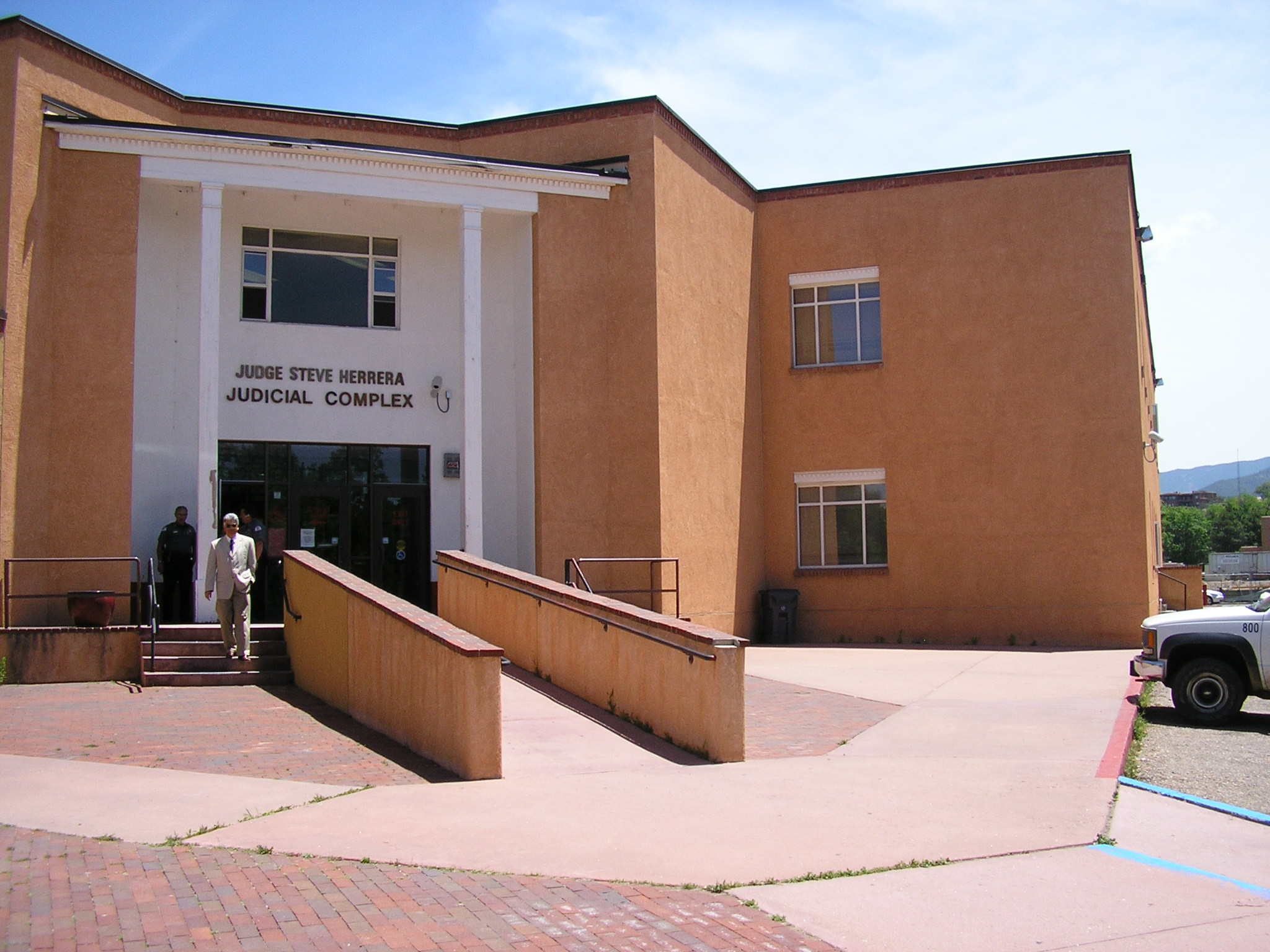
The front entrance of the Santa Fe Courthouse

On Friday, June 15, 2007, a bright, round object was recorded by a surveillance camera moving around in the image of the rear entrance of the First Judicial District courthouse, Catron Street, Santa Fe. The recording, starting at 7:27:11 a.m., shows a bright spot of light that comes into view at the top right hand corner of the image before moving downwards and out of the camera's field of view in the bottom left hand side of the image at 7:27:23 a.m. After Jason Auslander of The Santa Fe New Mexican reported on the event and uploaded the footage to YouTube it was picked up by various news outlets such as ABC News, CBS News, Fox News, The Boston Globe and The San Francisco Chronicle and promptly became a topic of discussion all over the country.

Soon after the footage was released to the public, a large number of people contacted the Santa Fe New Mexican and Auslander proposing various theories on what the object was. Some thought the object might be ball lightning; others were convinced they could see a face in the image. One woman who claimed to be a spiritual reader said she saw five separate spirits in the video and another person advised the journalist to consult a "reputable channeler". The New Mexican website logged thousands of hits for the video. The video was later uploaded to YouTube and was viewed more than 50,000 times within a couple of days, reaching the top 15 videos on the site at that time. This drew hundreds of additional e-mails from people to the news outlet.

Many predictions were made about the real identity of the mysterious object within the staff of the courthouse as well. Some people supposed that it was the ghost of convicted murderer Andy Lopez, who was shot and killed at the courthouse after taking nine people hostage in February 1985. Other pseudo-scientific predictions included a spirit of a little girl who was lost and a different ghost who had been disturbed by the construction of a convention centre across the street. However, some more realistic hypotheses from the courthouse staff were that it might be a cottonwood seed, someone walking with a light on their head, an insect or spider walking on the camera lens or a reflection, perhaps from a passing car. Vanessa Pacheco, who was the supervisor of the court security for the Santa Fe County Sheriff's Office, said people's opinions on the video depended on whether they believe in ghosts.

== Investigation ==
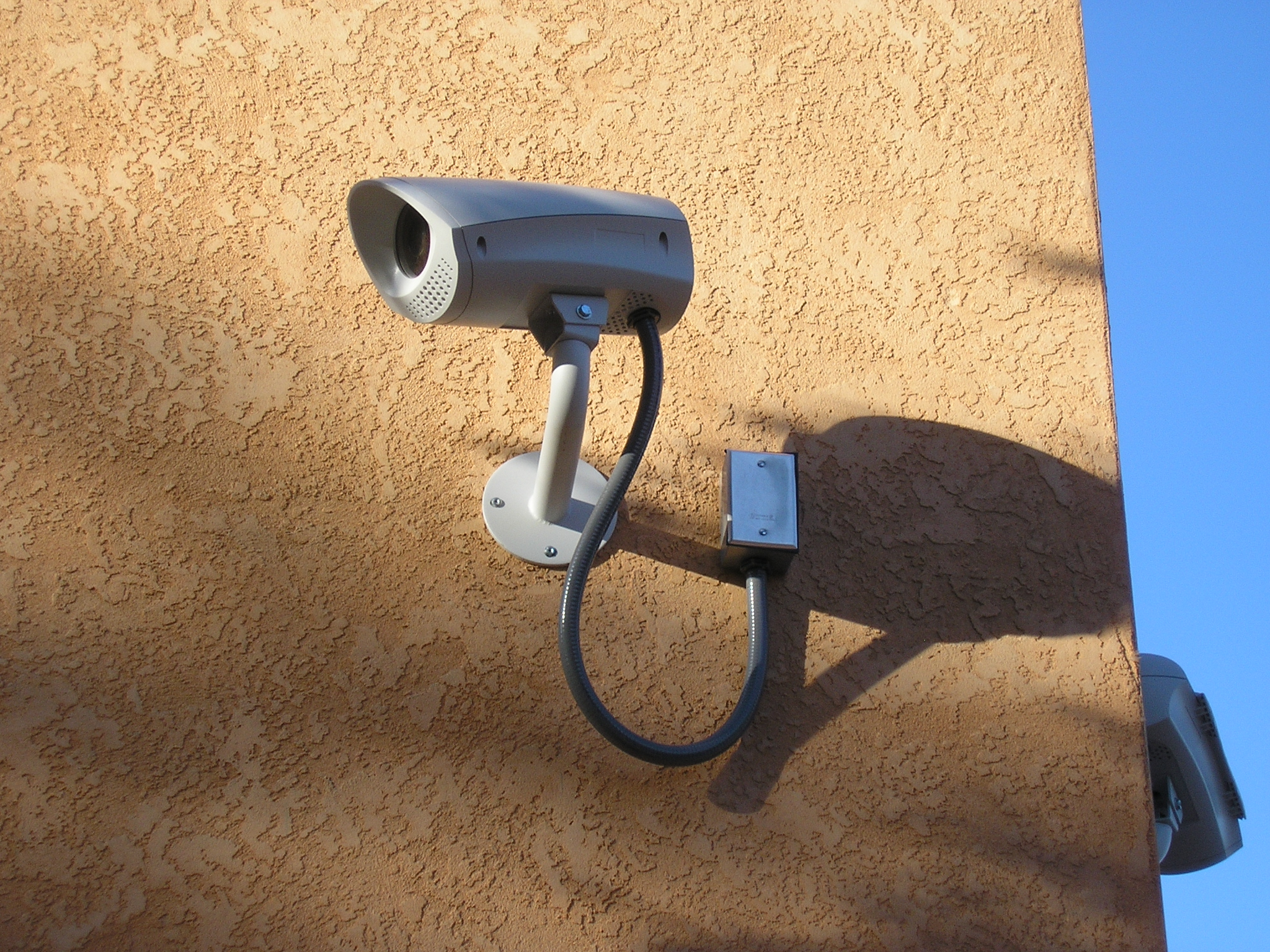
The camera at the Santa Fe courthouse which recorded the ghostly image

Benjamin Radford, the deputy editor of Skeptical Inquirer science magazine, a LiveScience columnist and author of hundreds of articles and several books on science, skepticism, and the paranormal, was invited at the request of The New Mexican to do research on the phenomenon. After the first day of his investigation he had ruled out a number of potential causes including camera artifacts, reflections and hoaxes. Of the chances of the image being a hoax he said "It was almost certainly not a hoax, because it's unlikely anyone would think to make a blurry, indistinguishable blob on a courthouse surveillance video". Having investigated many similar ghost videos of this type, he said that "the quality of the image is often inversely proportional to the belief that the object is a ghost; the fuzzier and more ambiguous the form, the more likely a ghost will be offered as an explanation".

He believed the undetermined object was most likely a fluffy cottonwood seed or a spider or insect crawling across the camera lens. To find out what lay behind the mystery, he conducted two sets of experiments, one by scattering cotton from the adjacent cottonwood tree and one by using insects. The first experiment involved collecting cottonwood fluff from a nearby tree and blowing it into the air in front of the camera using a blow tube. This proved to be inconclusive since the image cotton didn't represent a glowing fluffy ball the same as the one in the original recording.

The second experiment using bugs, in the end, was more successful. Radford originally tried to coax a small moth to fly in front of the camera lens but was unsuccessful. He then purchased 1,750 ladybugs from a local supplier and came back to next day at 7:00am hoping to get a result using the same lighting conditions as when the event was originally recorded. After placing the bugs on the camera he waited a while to let them crawl all over it before going inside to review the recording. Initially the bugs didn't appear to create the same glowing image as was first recorded but at 7:26am they finally had success. The sun hit one of the bugs crawling across the lens and the effect recreated an accurate "ghost" down to its color, size, shape and movement. The courthouse staff watching the recording agreed that the mystery had been solved and the origin of the ghost was nothing more than a bug. A detailed report on Radford's experiments was published in Skeptical Inquirer magazine's September/October issue that year, and in 2014 in Radford's book Mysterious New Mexico.

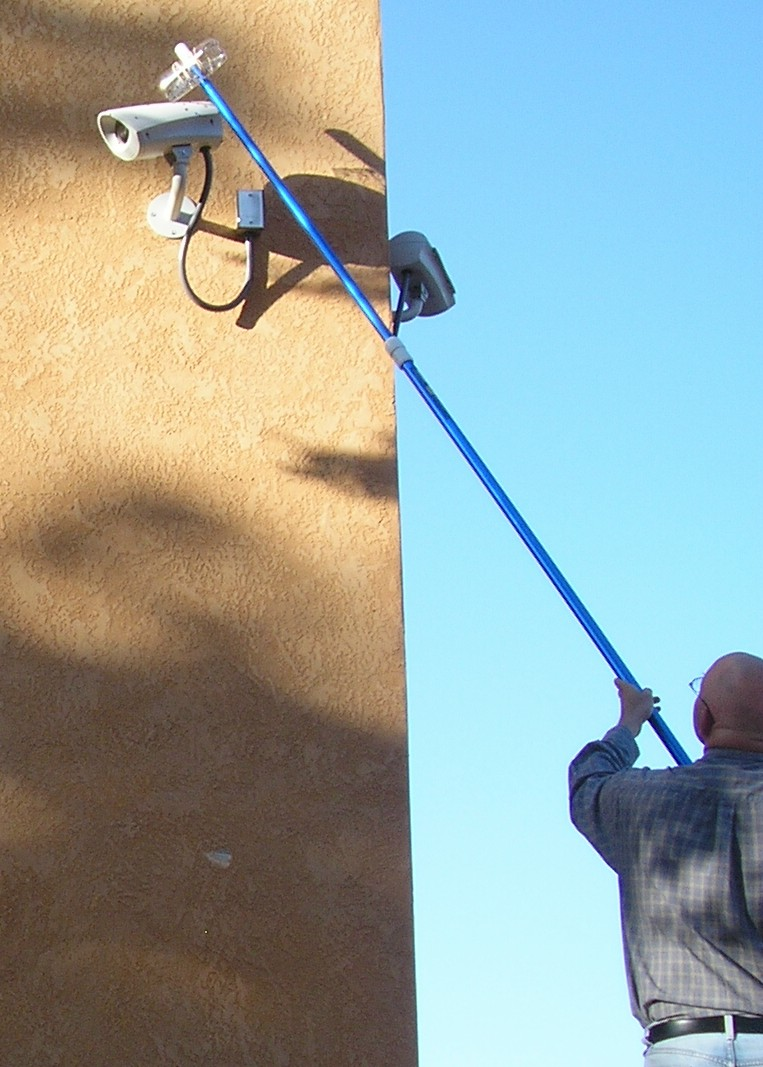
Investigator Benjamin Radford conducting experiments on the courthouse camera

== See also ==
- Debunker
- List of haunted locations
- List of reportedly haunted locations in the United States
- Skeptical movement
- List of scientific skeptics
