= Guy P. Harrison =

American author (born 1963)

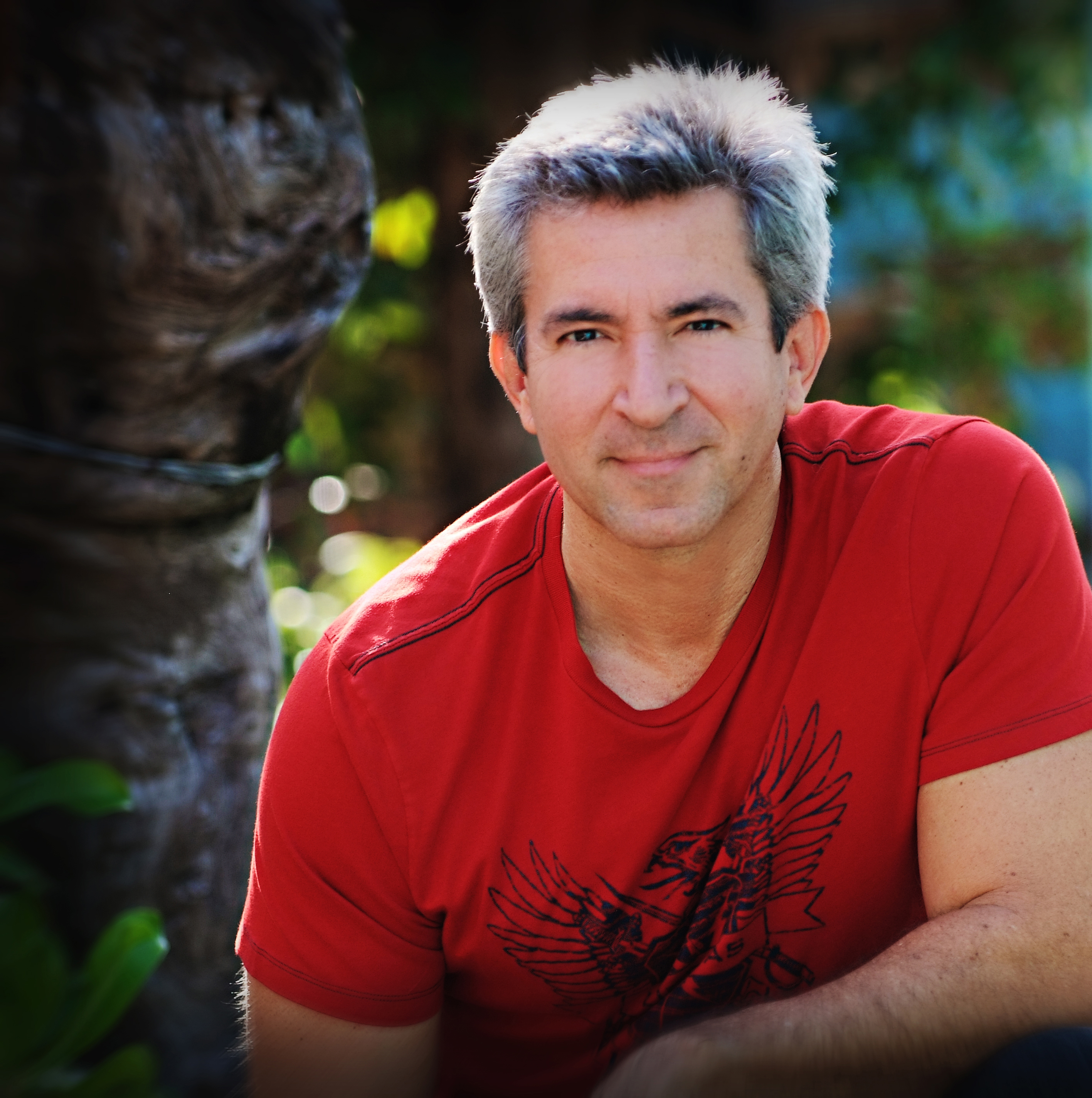
- Harrison in 2009
- Born: October 8, 1963 (age 63)
- Education: University of South Florida
- Occupation: Author
- Writing career
- Language: English

Guy P. Harrison (born October 8, 1963) is an American author of bestselling books. He writes about science, critical thinking, history, race, and nature.

== Early life and education ==
Born October 8, 1963, Harrison has degrees in history and anthropology from the University of South Florida.

== Career ==
From 1992 to 2010, Harrison wrote for Cayman Free Press in the Cayman Islands as a journalist, editor and photographer. As a journalist he has interviewed people such as Jane Goodall, Chuck Yeager, Edward Teller, Paul Tibbets and Armin Lehmann. From 2014–2015, he did medical writing for Kaiser Permanente. He has a blog at Psychology Today named About Thinking.

Harrison has written books on science, skeptical and philosophical issues, beginning with 50 Reasons People Give for Believing in a God in 2008. He has been interviewed about his work on podcasts and websites.

== Honors ==
Harrison was a recipient of the World Health Organization Award for Health Reporting in 1997 and the Commonwealth Media Award for Excellence in Journalism in 1994.

== Bibliography ==
- Damn You, Entropy!: 1,001 of the Greatest Science Fiction Quotes (2024)
- 50 Reasons People Give for Believing in a God (2008)
- Race and Reality: What Everyone Should Know about Our Biological Diversity (2010)
- 50 Simple Questions for Every Christian (2013)
- 50 Popular Beliefs that People Think are True (2012)
- Think: Why You Should Question Everything (2013)
- Good Thinking: What You Need to Know to be Smarter, Safer, Wealthier, and Wiser (2015)
- Think Before You Like: Social Media's Effect on the Brain and the Tools You Need to Navigate Your Newsfeed (2017)
- At Least Know This: Essential Science to Enhance Your Life (Prometheus Books, 2018)

=== Think Before You Like ===
In a review in Skeptical Inquirer magazine, researcher Ben Radford writes that Harrison examines social media offering "practical advice on media literacy and cyber self-defense". Radford states that Chapter 2 might be the most relevant to skeptics trying to "understand the psychological and social consequences of social media". Think Before You Like was published in 2017 before information about how the power of social media was used in the US presidential elections. Yet, according to Radford, "Harrison's book will only become more timely in the coming years".

=== At Least Know This ===
Reviewed in the Spring 2019 issue of Skeptical Inquirer by Russ Dobler, who writes that At Least Know This is a primer for the layperson who wants to understand what we know, not necessarily how we know it. Dobler calls this "a Herculean organizational effort" that "excels". Harrison brings his skills as a journalist as well as his degrees in history and anthropology to discuss weighty topics "spanning all of time and space". It almost "feels a bit like an attempt at a twenty-first century version of Cosmos" yet, some "science purists who prioritize methodology over trivia" may not agree. Dobler writes: "one step at a time. Bring the wonder, and maybe the rigor will follow".
