= Benjamin Radford =

American writer, investigator, and skeptic (born 1970)

- Radford at Dragon Con in 2026
- Born: October 2, 1970 (age 55); New York City, U.S.
- Education: University of New Mexico (BS); University at Buffalo (MEd); Dartmouth College (MPH)
- Occupations: Writer, investigator, podcaster, research fellow
- Known for: Media and science literacy educator, scientific paranormal investigation, MonsterTalk podcast, Squaring the Strange podcast
- Website: benjaminradford.com

Signature
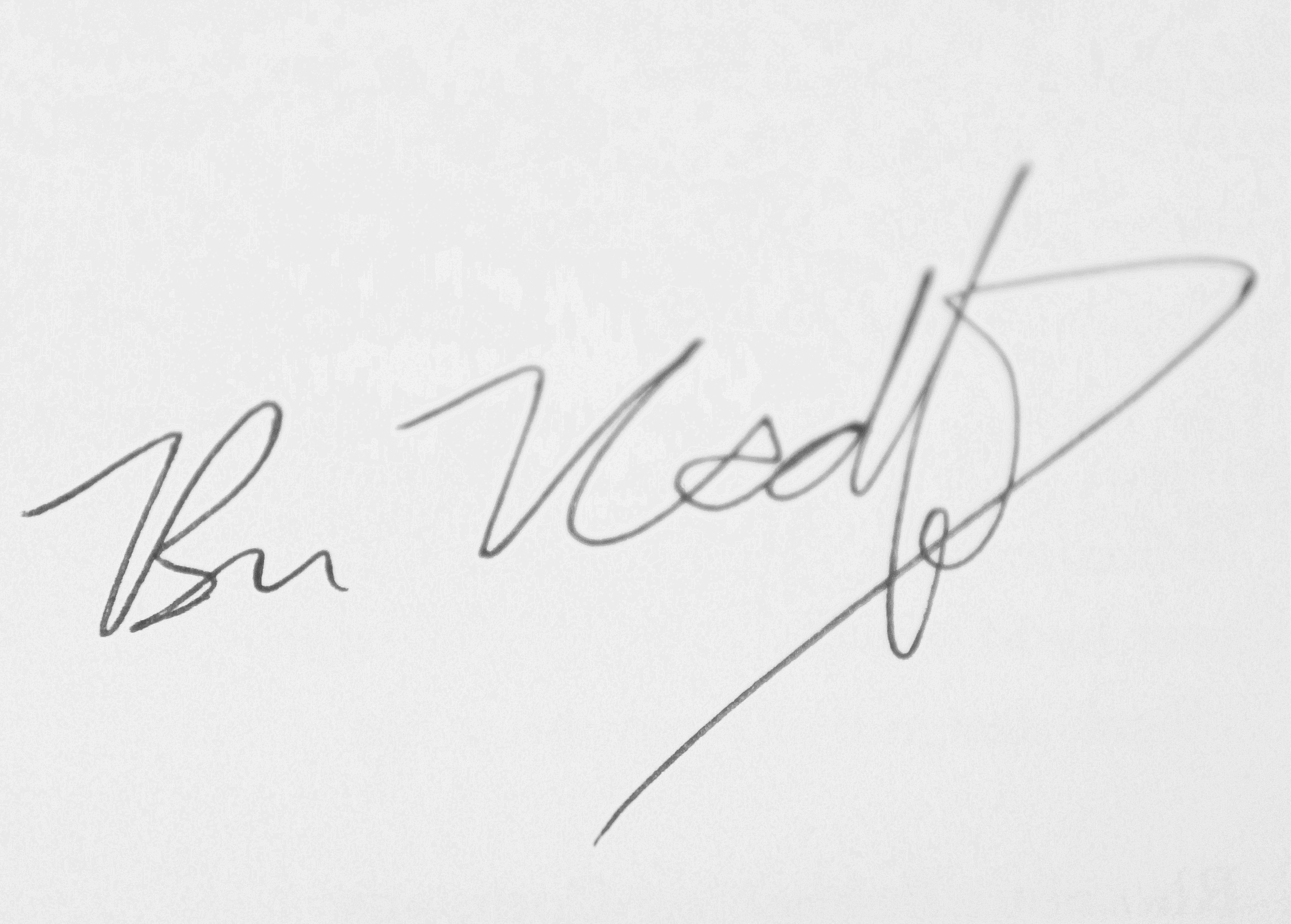

Benjamin Radford (born October 2, 1970) is an American writer, investigator, and skeptic. He has authored, coauthored or contributed to over twenty books and written over a thousand articles and columns on a wide variety of topics including urban legends, unexplained mysteries, the paranormal, critical thinking, mass hysteria, and media literacy. His book, Mysterious New Mexico: Miracles, Magic, and Monsters in the Land of Enchantment, was published in the summer of 2014 and is a scientific investigation of famous legends and folklore in the state of New Mexico. In 2016 Radford published Bad Clowns, a 2017 IPPY bronze award winner, and he is regarded as an expert on the bad clowns phenomenon.

Radford has appeared on Good Morning America, CNN, The History Channel, the National Geographic Channel, the Learning Channel, CBC, BBC, ABC News, The New York Times, and many other outlets.

Radford characterizes himself as one of the world's few science-based paranormal investigators, and has done first-hand research into psychics, ghosts, exorcisms, miracles, Bigfoot, stigmata, lake monsters, UFO sightings, reincarnation, crop circles, and other topics. "I'm open-minded. I never said I don't believe ghosts exist. But I can say I've looked at the research that's been done, and I've done personal investigations. In each particular case there either is or isn't good, compelling evidence, and so far I haven't seen it."

He regularly speaks at universities and conferences across the country and internationally about his research, folklore and about science and skepticism. Radford's books and investigations have been incorporated into several college and university courses on critical thinking, including at Western Washington University and the University of New Mexico.

Radford is also a contributor to the website Snopes.com, where he has researched and written articles debunking fakelore and a variety of popular myths including The Amityville Horror, and the claim that humans only use 10% of their brains.

== Early life ==
Radford became interested in "the mysterious and the unexplained" as a child from reading books about, "monsters and dragons, the Bermuda Triangle, psychics in Russia that could move automobiles with their mind", etc. He also became interested through television shows such as That's Incredible and Ripley's Believe It or Not. He grew disenchanted with the lack of scientific rigor in the books and television shows because there seemed to be little or no investigation or proper references.

Radford's first encounter with formal skepticism came as a result of a fruitless search for beer in a "dry" county in Utah. Winning a regional essay contest while at the University of New Mexico, he was flown to present his paper at a college town in Utah. He and his colleagues came across a tiny used bookstore where he acquired an old issue of Skeptical Inquirer featuring an article on the prophesies of Nostradamus penned by none other than James Randi. He relates that this was the first article he'd read criticizing Nostradamus and offered "skeptical, logical, and reasonable explanations for the prophecies apparent accuracy".

Radford holds a bachelor's degree in psychology (graduating magna cum laude) with a minor in professional writing from the University of New Mexico where he was inducted into the Phi Beta Kappa honor society in 1993. He also has a master's degree in education from the University at Buffalo where his focus was on Science and the Public, and his masters thesis was titled Misinformation in Eating Disorder Communications: Implications for Science Communication Policy. Radford stated that he chose this topic because it "involved several of my longstanding interests such as myths and misinformation ... eating disorders (a subject I first became involved with when helping an ex-girlfriend struggle with bulimia); and the news media".

He graduated from the Geisel School of Medicine at Dartmouth in 2022, earning a master's degree in Public Health. He was inducted into the Delta Omega Honorary Society in Public Health, and was the recipient of a 2022 Social Justice Award from the Dartmouth Institute.

== Career ==
=== Journalism ===
Radford served as managing editor of the science magazine Skeptical Inquirer from 1997 until early 2011, when he was promoted to deputy editor. He is also a regular columnist at the magazine. Until it suspended publication in 2009, he was editor-in-chief of the Spanish-language magazine Pensar, published in Buenos Aires, Argentina. Radford has been a regular columnist for Discovery News, LiveScience.com, and the Skeptical Briefs newsletter.

Radford is a co-founder and former co-host of MonsterTalk, a podcast, which critically examines the science and folklore behind cryptozoological (and legendary) creatures such as Bigfoot, the Loch Ness Monster and werewolves. MonsterTalk won the 2012 Parsec podcast award for the “Best Fact Behind the Fiction” category.

Radford is a Research Fellow with the non-profit educational organization Committee for Skeptical Inquiry. He presented at the American Folklore Society's annual conference on Folklore of the Chupacabra. in 2011 and 2024 He presented at several conferences of the International Society for Contemporary Legend Research (San Antonio in 2015, Brussels 2018, Sheffield 2023 and Logan 2024)

Radford's writings also focus on topics related to women and minorities, particularly in South America and Africa. Through his books, articles, blogs, and podcasts he has raised awareness of many social problems that disproportionately affect women, including modern witchcraft in India, Nepal, and Pakistan; the Chibok schoolgirls kidnapping in 2014; acid attack victims in Pakistan; and sex trafficking.

Guy P. Harrison reviews Radford's 2016 book Bad Clowns saying, "Who knew naughty clowns could be so interesting?" Radford spends time on the "unfounded hype and hysteria" of stories of clowns in journalism including John Wayne Gacy and the Aurora Colorado shooter James Holmes.

=== Scientific paranormal investigator ===
Described as a "professional skeptic", Radford works at the Committee for Skeptical Inquiry investigating all manner of unusual claims and events. His work includes investigation, reporting, journalism, science literacy education, and public speaking.

Radford explains his approach by saying "I am not paid to doubt things; I am paid to promote science and investigate unusual claims. Our approach is empirical, evidence- and science-based. Science has proven itself incredibly successful in explaining and finding out about the world. If we wish to know why a certain disease strikes one person and not another, we turn to medicine instead of a witch doctor. If we wish to know how to build a bridge that can span a river, we turn to physics instead of psychics. Paranormal or “unexplained” topics are testable by science: either a psychic's prediction comes true or it doesn't; either ghosts exist in the real world or they don't. My job is not to doubt, nor debunk; it is to investigate. I have no vested interest in proving or disproving any unexplained phenomena; I get paid the same either way. But the cardinal rule is that an investigator must eliminate all the natural explanations before accepting supernatural ones, and must use sound science."

When asked "Have you ever been stumped by a mysterious claim?" Radford responded, "No". He responded more fully that there are times with some claims there isn't enough information or the information given to him wasn't correct. Radford compares these investigations to a crime scene investigating where there exists "a positive correlation between the quality of the available evidence and solving the mystery". Radford states he has a "high bar for what I am willing to concede is 'unexplained' or truly mysterious".

Paranormal researcher Brian D. Parsons in a review for Investigating Ghosts, praised the book, stating, "Radford is not saying ghosts do not exist. He's merely explaining and demonstrating that ghost researchers have been going about things wrong for a very long time".

=== Awards ===
As of 2023 Radford has been a finalist or winner of eight book awards.

Book Awards
Year	Award	From	Title
2011	Finalist	New Mexico-Arizona Book Awards	Tracking the Chupacabra: The Vampire Beast in Fact, Fiction, and Folklore
2011	Finalist	Foreword Reviews Book of the Year award	Tracking the Chupacabra: The Vampire Beast in Fact, Fiction, and Folklore
2012	Finalist	New Mexico-Arizona Book Awards	Scientific Paranormal Investigation: How to Solve Unexplained Mysteries
2014	Winner	Southwest Book Award	Mysterious New Mexico: Miracles, Magic, and Monsters in the Land of Enchantment
2017	Bronze	Independent Publisher Book Awards	Bad Clowns
2018	Winner, Science Category	New Mexico-Arizona Book Awards	Investigating Ghosts: The Scientific Search for Spirits
2021	Finalist, Nonfiction General	New Mexico-Arizona Book Awards	Big-If True: Adventures in Oddity
2023	Winner, Politics/Current Events	New Mexico-Arizona Book Awards	America the Fearful: Media and the Marketing of National Panic

=== Squaring the Strange ===
In April 2017 Radford and Pascual Romero launched the Squaring the Strange podcast with evidence-based analysis and commentary on a variety of topics ranging from the paranormal to the political. Frequent contributor and content producer Celestia Ward was later added as a cohost. The podcast features discussions on a wide variety of subjects including psychology, myths, hoaxes, folklore, and science. It has featured Radford's detailed analysis of the Blue Whale Challenge scare and his passionate criticism of the History Channel's Amelia Earhart documentary and its discredited photographic evidence.

== Investigations ==
Over the years, Radford published the results of investigations on a variety of phenomena deemed strange or paranormal.

=== Psychic detectives ===
Radford has researched and conducted investigations into claims made by psychics for over 20 years, concentrating on psychic detectives. Examples include John Edward, Sylvia Browne, Theresa Caputo, Noreen Renier, Brian Ladd, Allison DuBois, Pamela Ragland, Nancy Weber and Jane Duperow He has also researched both historic and contemporaneous missing persons cases to determine whether the victims were recovered through psychic means. He has also researched both historic and contemporaneous missing persons cases to determine whether the victims were recovered through psychic means. Examples include Laci Peterson, Nicola Bulley, Elizabeth Smart, Holly Bobo, Natalee Holloway, Osama bin Laden, Harley Dilly, Harsha Maddula, Lisa Stebic, Madeleine McCann, Ada Wasson and Mary Ellen Walters.

In 2010, in the wake of a devastating earthquake in Haiti, Radford issued a public plea for psychics to aid in finding missing victims, calling out several practitioners who claimed to have helped on missing person cases. None responded or helped.

From his investigations, Radford concluded that in virtually every case the missing person was found either by police and searchers, or random passersby, without assistance from specific information provided by psychics. In many cases, after a person or body is recovered through ordinary means, psychics will reframe some of their earlier vague clues and predictions to make them appear accurate and relevant.

=== Chase Vault coffins (2017-2019) ===
Radford investigated 19th century reports of coffins that moved by themselves at the Chase Vault in the Barbados town of Oistins. He was able to determine the brick vault walls didn't show any of the damage would be expected from the movement of lead-lined coffins; there were also sourcing issues with the main testimony. Radford connected the legend with other similar stories in the region, showing the Chase Vault coffin tale is probably an adaptation of a story that has its point of origin elsewhere.

=== Dyatlov Pass deaths (2014) ===
The 2014 Discovery Channel special Russian Yeti: The Killer Lives explored claims that the Dyatlov group was killed by an enraged Russian yeti. Radford wrote an in-depth review of the show for the Doubtful News website on June 1. In it, he notes that "Russian Yeti: The Killer Lives begins with the premise that the injuries sustained by the skiers were so grave and extraordinary that could only have been inflicted by an inhumanly strong creature." Radford points out that no evidence is offered to support this premise, and that the injuries (such as broken ribs, skull fractures, burnt hands, and a missing tongue) can be accounted for by an avalanche, struggling to start a fire, and post-mortem predation by conventional animals. Radford further points out that the only reference to “snowmen” in one of the hikers’ diaries is clearly a joke, never mentioned by any of the others in their private journals.

=== Chupacabra (2010) ===
Radford spent five years investigating the mysterious monster el chupacabra, and came to the conclusion that the monster sightings were inspired by the 1995 film Species, and were aided and abetted by faulty eyewitness accounts, lack of forensic knowledge, and mass hysteria. His account of the investigation is detailed in his 2011 book Tracking the Chupacabra: The Vampire Beast in Fact, Fiction, and Folklore. The investigation included eyewitness interviews, forensic and folkloric research, and "a field expedition to the jungles of Nicaragua" in search of the legendary monster.

Similar media-inspired monster sightings have been offered to explain for Loch Ness Monster (inspired by scenes depicting a Plesiosaur-like monster in the 1933 King Kong movie) and of the fictional bogey-man Slender Man reported on the talk-radio show Coast to Coast.

Tracking the Chupacabra was a Finalist for two books awards including Book of the Year. According to Outside Magazine, Radford came to the conclusion that the chupacabra "was nothing but a cinematic fever dream."

=== The Los Angeles UFO / mystery missile (2010) ===
In November 2010, a UFO was sighted and recorded in the sky over Los Angeles by a news helicopter cameraman.

In a column for Discovery News, Radford was one of the first journalists to critically analyze the video and correctly identify the UFO or “mystery missile” as an airplane contrail.

=== Kansas City gym ghost video (2008) ===
Radford investigated and solved the mystery of an alleged "ghost video" taken at Anytime Fitness, an all-night fitness club in Overland Park, Kansas in 2008. Surveillance cameras caught the glowing, fuzzy light in a workout area, wandering over the weight benches and fitness machines. The video was circulated on YouTube, generating more than 100,000 views.

Radford concluded the actual culprit to be merely an insect on the camera lens. His conclusions were based on the several facts: 1) the image only showed up on one of several cameras covering the area, 2) the fuzzy and out-of-focus image indicated that the object was closer rather than farther to the security camera which is designed to focus at longer distances, 3) the image appears to reflecting rather than emitting light, and 4) the image appeared to go over objects in the room rather than going around them.

=== Santa Fe courthouse ghost (2007) ===
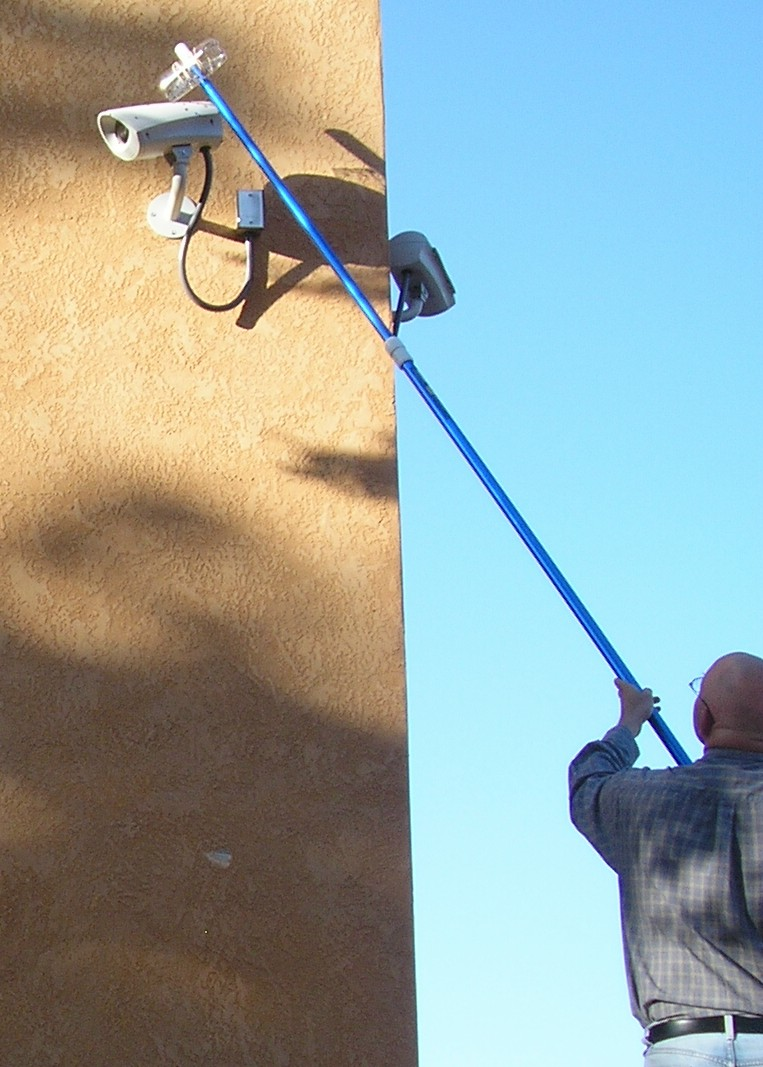
Radford conducting an experiment on a camera at the Santa Fe Courthouse

In 2007, Radford solved the mystery of the "Santa Fe Courthouse Ghost", a mysterious, glowing, white blob that was captured on videotape June 15, by a security camera at a courthouse in Santa Fe, New Mexico. While the court personnel who first saw the image could not explain it, others soon offered their own explanations, and a ghost was among the most popular. Radford conducted several days of on-site field investigations at the courthouse, and after several experiments duplicated the "ghost" effect by placing insects on the video camera that recorded the original event.

=== The White Witch of Rose Hall (2007) ===
In Fortean Times magazine and his book Scientific Paranormal Investigation, Radford published his re-creations of the "ghost photos" taken at Rose Hall, a mansion near Montego Bay in Jamaica, showing that alleged paranormal phenomena caught on film at that location were camera artifacts and reflected flashes, not ghosts.

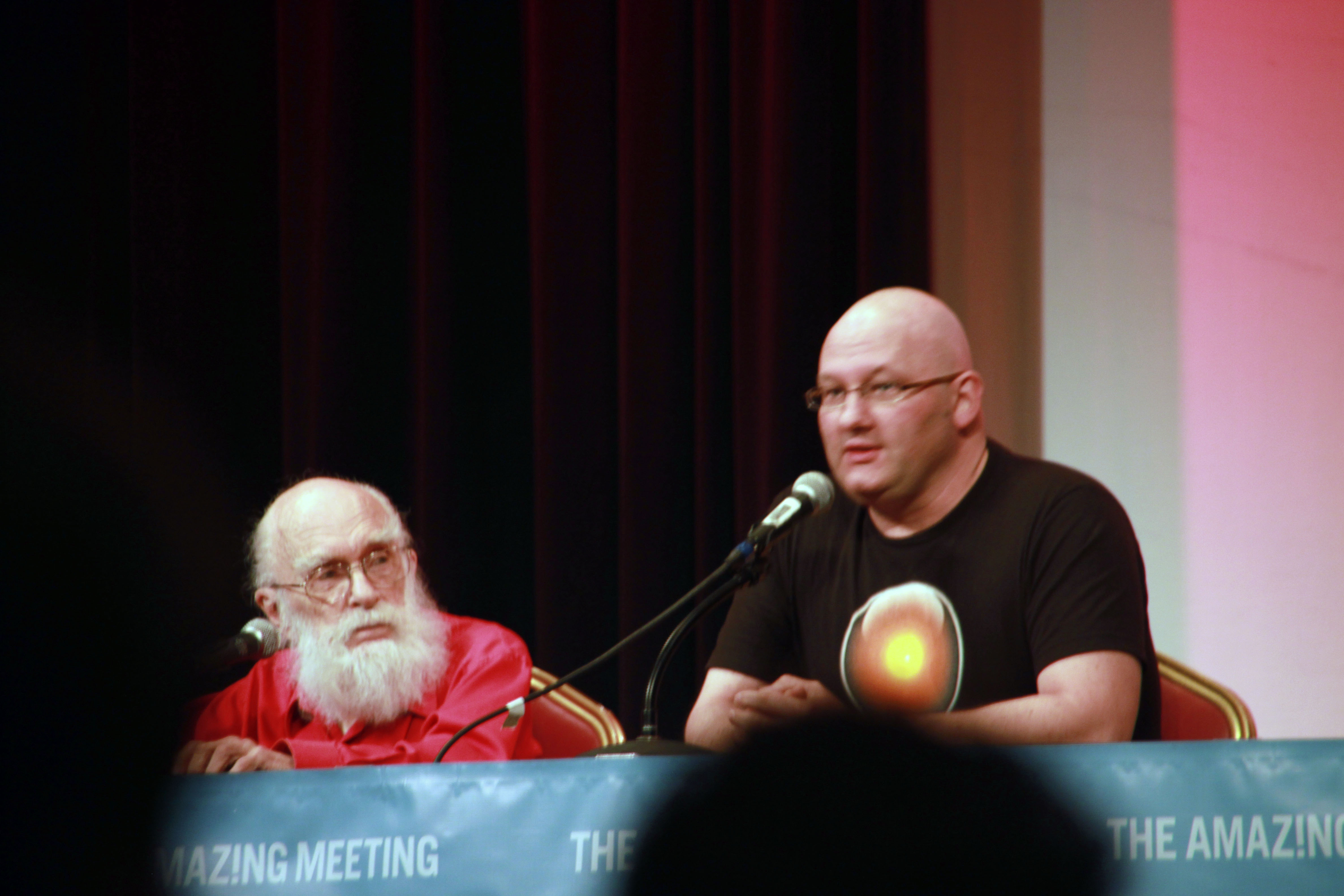
Ben Radford with James Randi in a panel discussion at The Amaz!ng Meeting 2012

=== Pokémon panic (2001) ===
In 2001, Radford investigated the mysterious 1997 incident in which thousands of Japanese children seemingly suffered seizures while watching "Dennō Senshi Porygon", an episode of the Pokémon anime. Though many doctors advanced theories including photosensitive epilepsy, Radford proffered evidence that the incident was rooted in mass hysteria. The resulting article, co-authored by Robert Bartholomew, was published in the February 2001 Southern Medical Journal.

"We studied a reported illness outbreak occurring on December 16, 1997, involving more than 12,000 Japanese children who had various signs and symptoms of illness after watching an episode of a popular animated cartoon, Pokémon. While photosensitive epilepsy was diagnosed in a minuscule fraction of those affected, this explanation cannot account for the breadth and pattern of the events. The characteristic features of the episode are consistent with the diagnosis of epidemic hysteria, triggered by sudden anxiety after dramatic mass media reports describing a relatively small number of genuine photosensitive-epilepsy seizures. The importance of the mass media in precipitating outbreaks of mass psychogenic illness is discussed."

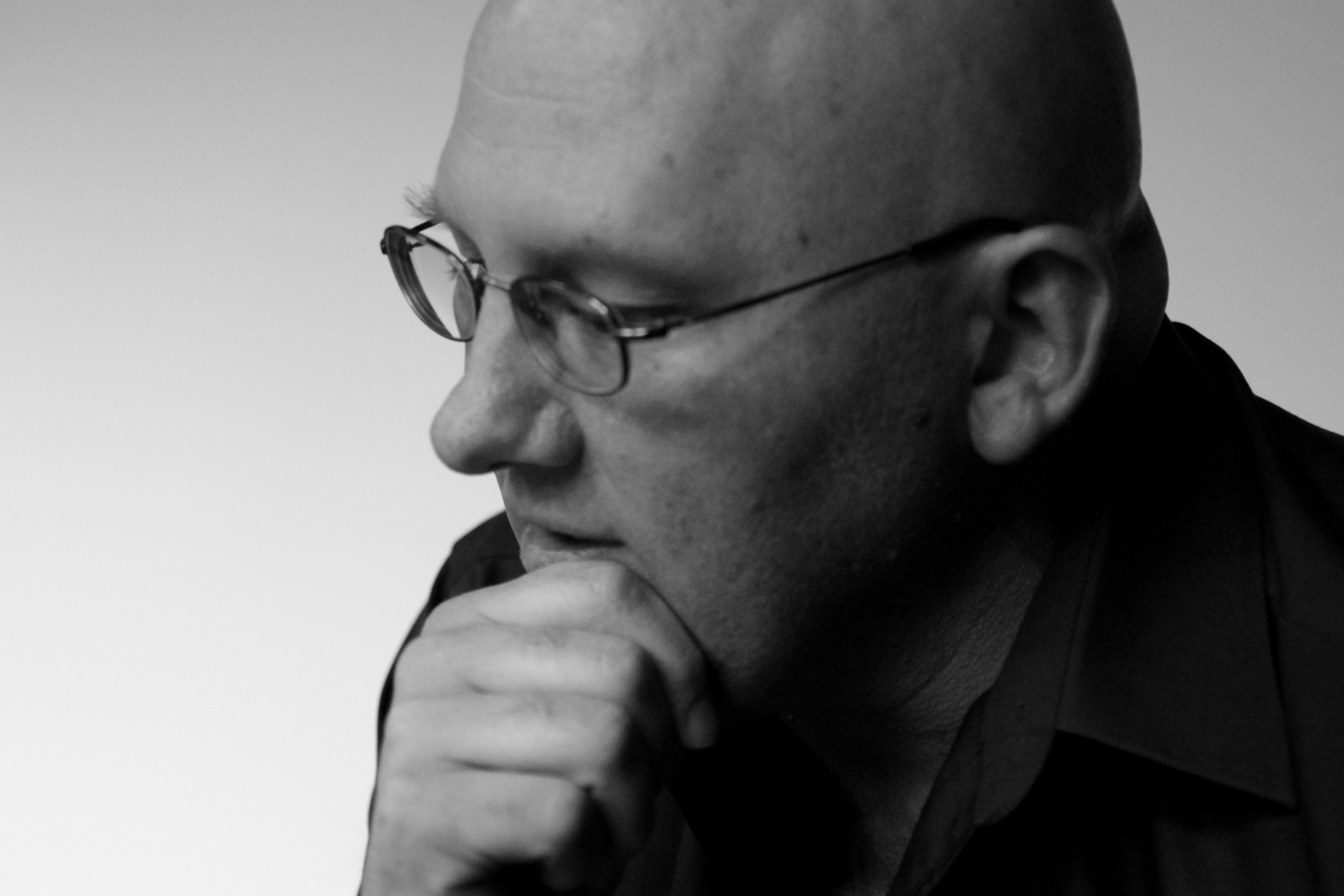
Ben Radford lectures at CFI West on Paranormal Investigations, June 18, 2011.

=== The "Champ" photo (1977) ===
The photo, taken by Sandra Mansi in 1977, sparked investigations and national interest into the creature allegedly living in Lake Champlain. John Kirk, in his book In the Domain of the Lake Monsters, writes that "The monster of Lake Champlain... has the distinction of being the only lake monster of whom there is a reasonably clear photograph. It... is extremely good evidence of an unidentified lake-dwelling animal". After investigating claims of a monster in Lake Champlain that has been nicknamed "Champ", Radford, along with Joe Nickell concluded that the object in the famous photo was almost certainly a floating log or tree-trunk. Joe Zarzynski, author of Champ: Beyond the Legend (1984), calls the photo "the best single piece of evidence on Champ."

The results of the Champ and Mansi photo investigation were published in the book Lake Monster Mysteries, as well as in Skeptical Inquirer magazine and Fortean Times magazine. Radford and Nickell re-enacted their experiments and investigation for the Discovery Channel in 1995.

== Films ==
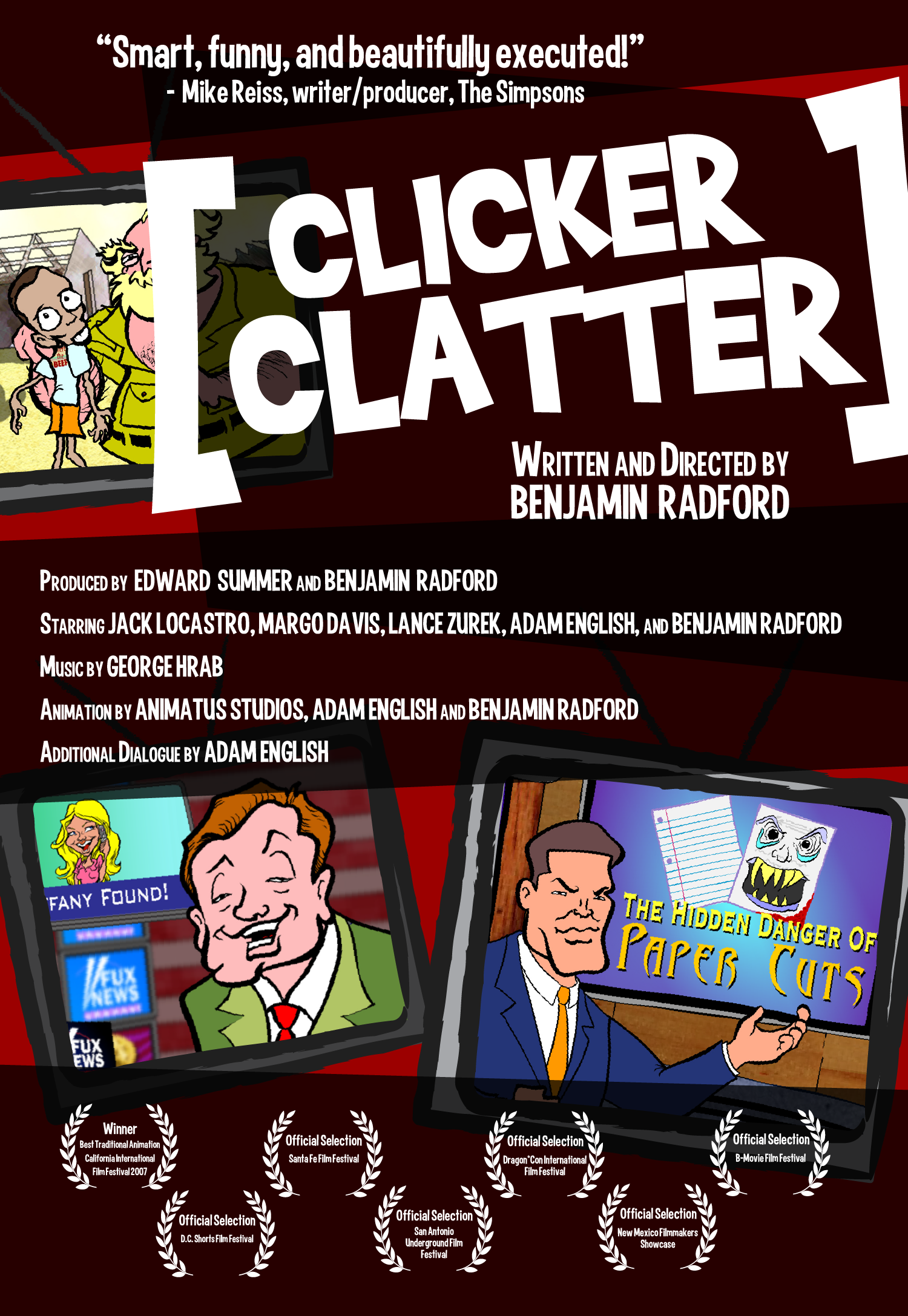
Clicker Clatter poster

Radford has appeared in films that address his investigatory work. In Wrinkles the Clown he discussed the historical roots of deviant clowns, and in Science Friction he was interviewed about his experience with documentaries which misrepresent the interviews with experts in their field.

In addition to his scientific skepticism work, Radford has written and directed several animated short films. In Sirens (2009), "A young boy in a small-town library avoids his math homework and is instead drawn into the world of the mythological Sirens, beautiful women who lured sailors to their doom."

Both films screened at film festivals around the world, and Clicker Clatter won the “Best Traditional Animation” award at the 2007 California International Animation Festival.

Radford also wrote and directed the documentary short film State of Nebraska v. Crotchy the Clown which screened at the 2026 Atlanta Documentary Film Festival. It won Best Documentary Short.

== Board games ==
=== Playing Gods ===
In 2008 Radford released Playing Gods: The Board Game of Divine Domination, a satirical board game he created based on theme of gods warring over the control of believers. The game is described as a "theological version of Risk" and contains figures based on Jesus, Moses, Buddha and many other religions including satirical religions like the Flying Spaghetti Monster and J. R. Bob Dobbs. The game made its world premiere at the New York Toy Fair in March 2009 and debuted at Dragon*Con in Atlanta, Georgia. Playing Gods is produced through Radford's company, Balls Out Entertainment.

Australia's Synergy Magazine reported Playing Gods has "some of the nicest pawns I have ever seen in a board game... has great game play and comes with a smart, cynical and satirical tone. Playing Gods is blasphemy with style and offers a great board game with a good dose of insight and a great load of fun!”. Other players have praised the game as "one of the coolest and most important things to happen to parlor games", and "awesome, and damned funny.. it's Candyland for people who want the express train to hell". Carl Raschke, professor of religious studies at University of Denver, criticized Radford's board game telling USA Today that the game "sounds too stupid to go far".

=== Undead Apocalypse ===
In 2013, Radford released plans for a followup to the Playing Gods board game, entitled Undead Apocalypse: War of the Damned. It would have integrated genuine lore concerning werewolves, vampires and zombies into the board game. A Kickstarter campaign to fund the game was launched in June 2013, but was cancelled when it became clear it would not fully fund.

== Selected bibliography ==
- Bartholomew, Robert; Radford, Benjamin (2003), Hoaxes, Myths, and Manias: Why We Need Critical Thinking, Amherst, NY: Prometheus Books, p. 229, ISBN 978-1591020486
- Radford, Benjamin (2003), Media Mythmakers : How Journalists, Activists, and Advertisers Mislead Us, Amherst, NY: Prometheus Books, p. 324, ISBN 978-1591020721
- Radford, Benjamin; Nickell, Joe (2006), Lake Monster Mysteries : Investigating the World's Most Elusive Creatures, Lexington, KY: University Press of Kentucky, p. 208, ISBN 978-0813123943
- Radford, Benjamin (2010), Scientific Paranormal Investigation: How to Solve Unexplained Mysteries, Rhombus Publishing Company, p. 312, ISBN 978-0936455112
- Radford, Benjamin (2011), Tracking the Chupacabra: The Vampire Beast in Fact, Fiction, and Folklore, University of New Mexico Press, p. 288, ISBN 978-0826350152, archived from the original on May 18, 2011
- Bartholomew, Robert; Radford, Benjamin (2011), The Martians Have Landed! A History of Media-Driven Panics and Hoaxes, McFarland and Co., p. 254, ISBN 978-0786464982
- Radford, Benjamin (2014), Mysterious New Mexico: Miracles, Magic, and Monsters in the Land of Enchantment, University of New Mexico Press, p. 304, ISBN 978-0826354501
- Radford, Benjamin (2016), Bad Clowns, University of New Mexico Press, p. 188, ISBN 978-0-8263-5666-6
- Radford, Benjamin (2017), Investigating Ghosts: The Scientific Search for Spirits, Rhombus Publishing Company, pp. 396 (Kindle edition), ASIN B0788YCFHP
- Radford, Benjamin (2020), Big-If True: Adventures in Oddity (Paranormal), Rhombus Publishing Company, p. 280, ISBN 978-0936455174
- Radford, Benjamin (2022), America the Fearful: Media and the Marketing of National Panics, Mcfarland & Company, Inc., p. 225, ISBN 978-1-4766-8772-8
