= Ozark Howler =

Legendary creature in Arkansas folklore

The Ozark Howler is a cryptid in the folklore of Arkansas, said to dwell in the Ozark Mountains of Northern Arkansas, Northeastern Oklahoma and Southern Missouri. According to tradition, the creature is bear-like in shape with a dark colored, shaggy coat. Local traditions and documented sightings preserve the mystique of the Ozark Howler even if some people think it is a myth or misidentified species.

== Origins ==
While most reported sightings of the Ozark Howler are from the 20th century, the creature's origins may come from a late 18th century report by Daniel Boone, who claimed to have killed a large, hairy creature in the region.

== Recent sightings ==
In December 2015, the Arkansas television station 40/29 News reported that it had received photographs purported to be images of the creature from a viewer. The station contacted the Arkansas Game and Fish Commission, who responded that they had heard of no claims of sightings of the creature, and said that the images sent to the station were a hoax.

Call records to the Arkansas Game and Fish Commission during the fall of 2014 include a reported sighting of an animal in Benton County, Arkansas. In October 2014, a recorded emergency call received by the AGFC indicates a motorist nearly collided with an unidentified mammal at 9:45 PM. The recorded phone conversation indicates that armed state wildlife officers may have been dispatched to investigate what reports described as a bear-sized, gray, fast-running animal on Pump Station Road in Springdale.
