= Neurohistory =

Interdisciplinary approach to history

Neurohistory is an interdisciplinary approach to history that leverages advances in neuroscience to tell new kinds of stories about the past, but especially of deep history. This is achieved by incorporating the advances in neurosciences into historiographical theory and methodology in the attempt to reconstruct the past It was first proposed by Harvard professor Daniel Lord Smail in his work and it offers historians a way to engage critically with the implicit folk psychologies in the interpretation of evidence.

== Background ==
An account cited that neurohistory can be traced back to William Reddy's reception of experimental psychology and that this launched a neuroscientific wave in several fields of human sciences until it reached history. When Smail introduced neurohistory in his book On Deep History and the Brain, he proposed several ideas, particularly the implications of evolution – especially the evolution of human neuroplasticity – to history. Smail argued that the neurological complex lies at the heart of experience and is directly associated with social practices and institutions so that historians can no longer think in terms of nature and nurture. He also proposed other innovations such as the extension of the chronological bounds of what counts as history as well as the concept of sources. Aside from the written document he posited that history must also include stone fragments, fossils, and other historical traces.

Other supporters of neurohistory include Lynn Hunt. The methodological discussion and reflection on the co-operation between history and neuroscience are offered by Dieter Langewiesche/Niels Birbaumer. Subsequent commentaries have shown that the idea relies on evolutionary assumptions (notably a blend of exaptation and the Baldwin effect) and can be extended by drawing on ideas from neurophilosophy. The result has been suggested as providing the means for a new kind of historical method: history from within, which is conceived as an augmentation of history from below.

== Concept ==
As a historical approach, neurohistory allows the idea that the brain can be a narrative focus of history, one that is not anchored on the framework of political organization. An interpretation also describes it as an approach to the past that recognizes the evidence for brain plasticity in human development, giving context importance, particularly when constructing human experience.

Neurohistory is also linked with cultural history in the sense that it provides more insights, particularly with respect to early history, since it does not constrain historical imagination. It leads to the so-called implicit presentism drawn from historians' inferences projected from their folk-psychological notions through reconstructed context.
