= Beyond Belief =

Beyond Belief may refer to:

== Books ==
- Beyond Belief: A Chronicle of Murder and Its Detection, a 1967 book by Emlyn Williams
- Beyond Belief: The American Press and the Coming of the Holocaust, 1933–1945 (1993) by Deborah Lipstadt
- Beyond Belief: Islamic Excursions Among the Converted Peoples, a 1998 book by V. S. Naipaul
- Beyond Belief: The Secret Gospel of Thomas by Elaine Pagels, first published in 2004
- Beyond Belief: My Secret Life Inside Scientology and My Harrowing Escape a 2013 memoir by Jenna Miscavige Hill

== Film, television and radio ==
- Beyond Belief with George Noory, an online TV series launched in 2013 exploring paranormal and related subjects
- Beyond Belief (Stage Show/Podcast), a segment of the Thrilling Adventure Hour, a monthly stage show and podcast done in the style of old time radio
- Beyond Belief (1990 film), a short film featuring the band Petra
- Beyond Belief (2007 film), a documentary about two 9/11 widows
- Beyond Belief: Fact or Fiction, an American TV anthology series
- Beyond Belief (radio series), a BBC series featuring the discussion of religious issues

== Music ==
- Beyond Belief (album), a 1990 album by Petra
- Beyond Belief, an album by Mark McGuire (musician)
- "Beyond Belief", a 1982 song by Elvis Costello

== Other uses ==
- Beyond Belief (symposium), a series of conferences sponsored by the Science Network
  - Beyond Belief: Science, Religion, Reason and Survival, the first symposium, in 2006
