= Presidential commission (United States) =

Special task force ordained by the US President

In the United States, a presidential commission is a special task force ordained by the president to complete a specific, special investigation or research. They are often quasi-judicial in nature; that is, they include public or in-camera hearings.

== List of presidential commissions ==
- Commissioners to Confer with the Insurgents in the Western Counties of Pennsylvania (1794)
- First Philippine Commission – "Schurman Commission" (1899)
- Second Philippine Commission – "Taft Commission" (1900)
- Commission on the Organization of Government Scientific Work (1903)
- Committee on Department Methods – "Keep Commission" (1905–1909)
- President's Commission on Economy and Efficiency (1910–1912)
- President's Committee on Economic Security (1934)
- President's Commission on Administrative Management – "Brownlow Committee" (1937)
- Commission to Investigate the Japanese Attack on Pearl Harbor – a.k.a. "Roberts Commission" (1941)
- President's Committee on Civil Rights (1946)
- President's Scientific Research Board (1946)
- Presidential Commission on Higher Education (1947)
- Commission on Organization of the Executive Branch of the Government – Hoover Commission (1947)
- President's Committee on Equality of Treatment and Opportunity in the Armed Services – a.k.a. "Fahy Committee" (1948)
- President's Committee on Religious & Moral Welfare & Character Guidance in the Armed Forces (1948)
- President's Water Resources Policy Commission (1950)
- President's Communications Policy Board (1950)
- President's Commission on Migratory Labor (1950)
- President's Commission on Internal Security and Individual Rights (1951)
- President's Commission on the Health Needs of the Nation (1951)
- President's Commission on Immigration and Naturalization (1952)
- Commission on Intergovernmental Relations – a.k.a. "Kestenbaum Commission" (1953)
- President's Railroad Commission (1960)
- Presidential Commission on the Status of Women (1961)
- Trade and Environment Policy Advisory Committee (1962)
- The President's Commission on the Assassination of President Kennedy – a.k.a. "Warren Commission" (1963)
- President's Review Committee for Development Planning in Alaska (1964)
- President's Commission on Crime in the District of Columbia (1965–1969)
- President's Commission on Law Enforcement and Administration of Justice (1965–1969)
- President's Committee for People with Intellectual Disabilities (1966; formerly The President's Committee on Mental Retardation, 1963)
- National Advisory Commission on Civil Disorders – a.k.a. the "Kerner Commission" (1967–1968)
- President's Commission on Budget Concepts (1967–1969)
- National Commission on the Causes and Prevention of Violence (1969)
- President's Blue Ribbon Defense Panel (1969–1970) (urged 60% cuts in Pentagon staffs)
- President's Commission on Campus Unrest (1970)
- President's Commission on Financial Structure and Regulation – a.k.a. the "Hunt Commission" (1970–1971)
- National Commission on Fire Prevention and Control (1971)
- President's Commission on Olympic Sports (1975)
- National Commission on the Observance of International Women's Year (1975)
- U.S. President's Commission on CIA activities within the United States – a.k.a. Rockefeller Commission (1975)
- President's Advisory Board on International Investment (1977)
- Presidential Advisory Board on Ambassadorial Appointments (1977)
- President's Commission on Mental Health (1977)
- President's Commission on Military Compensation (1977)
- President's Commission on Foreign Language and International Studies (1978)
- President's Commission on the Coal Industry (1978)
- President's Commission on Pension Policy (1978)
- Presidential Commission on World Hunger (1978)
- President's Commission on the Holocaust (1978)
- President's Commission on the Accident at Three Mile Island (1979)
- President's Advisory Committee for Women (1979)
- President's Commission for a National Agenda for the Eighties (1979)
- President's Commission for the Study of Ethical Problems in Medicine & Biomedical & Behavioral Research (1979)
- Advisory Committee on Small and Minority Business Ownership (1980)
- President's Commission on United States–Liberian Relations (1980)
- President's Committee on the International Labor Organization (1980)
- President's Committee on Small Business Policy (1981)
- President's Council on Spinal Cord Injury (1981)
- President's Commission on Hostage Compensation (1981)
- President's Committee on the Arts and the Humanities (1982)
- President's Private Sector Survey on Cost Control – a.k.a. "Grace Commission" (1982)
- President's Commission for the Study of Ethical Problems in Medicine and Biomedical and Behavioral Research (1982)
- National Commission on Excellence in Education (1983)
- Presidential Commission on the Space Shuttle Challenger Accident – a.k.a. "Rogers Commission" (1986)
- President's Special Review Board (Iran-Contra) – a.k.a. "Tower Commission" (1986)
- President's Commission on Organized Crime (1986)
- President's Blue Ribbon Commission on Defense Management – a.k.a. "Packard Commission" (1986)
- President's Commission on the HIV Epidemic (1987)
- President's Advisory Commission on Educational Excellence for Hispanics (1990)
- Good Neighbor Environmental Board (1992)
- President's commission on aviation security and terrorism (1990)
- National Industrial Security Program Policy Advisory Committee (1993)
- National Space-Based Positioning, Navigation, and Timing Advisory Board (1995; recharted 2004) AKA:PDD-39
- Presidential Advisory Council on HIV/AIDS (1995)
- President's Commission on Veterans Education (1996)
- Presidential Advisory Commission on Holocaust Assets in the United States (1998)
- Invasive Species Advisory Committee (1999)
- Advisory Board on Radiation and Worker Health (2000)
- Marine Protected Areas Federal Advisory Committee (2000)
- President's Commission To Strengthen Social Security (2001)
- President's Commission on Excellence in Special Education (2001)
- Commission on the Future of the United States Aerospace Industry (2001)
- National Infrastructure Advisory Council (2001)
- 9/11 Commission (2002)
- President's Commission on the United States Postal Service (2002)
- Commerce Spectrum Management Advisory Committee (2004)
- President's Commission on Implementation of United States Space Exploration Policy (2004)
- Commission on the Intelligence Capabilities of the United States Regarding Weapons of Mass Destruction (2005)
- President's Commission on Care for America's Returning Wounded Warriors (2007)
- State, Local, Tribal, and Private Sector (SLTPS) Policy Advisory Committee (2009)
- National Commission on Fiscal Responsibility and Reform (2010)
- Blue Ribbon Commission on America's Nuclear Future (2010)
- Interagency Task Force on Veterans Small Business Development (2010)
- National Commission on the BP Deepwater Horizon Oil Spill and Offshore Drilling (2010)
- President's Council of Advisors on Science and Technology (Orig, 2001; recharted 2010)
- President's Council on Fitness, Sports, and Nutrition (Orig. 1944 National Committee on Physical Fitness; recharted 2010)
- President's Advisory Commission on Educational Excellence for African Americans (2012)
- San Juan Islands National Monument Advisory Committee (2013)
- Presidential Advisory Council on Combating Antibiotic-Resistant Bacteria (2014)
- President's Advisory Council on Doing Business in Africa (2014)
- Bears Ears National Monument Advisory Committee (2016)
- Commission on Enhancing National Cybersecurity (2016)
- Gold Butte National Monument Advisory Committee (2016)
- Governmental Advisory Committee to the United States Representative to the North American Commission for Environmental Cooperation (2016)
- National Advisory Committee to the United States Representative to the North American Commission for Environmental Cooperation (2016)
- President's Commission on Combating Drug Addiction and the Opioid Crisis (2017)
- Presidential Advisory Commission on Election Integrity (2017)
- President's Board of Advisors on Historically Black Colleges and Universities (2017)
- Presidential Commission on the Supreme Court of the United States (2021)
- President's Committee on the Arts and the Humanities (reinstituted) (2022)
- Department of Government Efficiency (2025)
- President’s Make America Healthy Again Commission (2025)
- Presidential Commission on the United States Space Academy

== See also ==
- Presidential task force
- Royal Commission
- Blue-ribbon panel
