= Roger Bingham (disambiguation) =

Roger Bingham (1948–2023) was a British science educator.

Roger Bingham may also refer to:

- Roger Bingham, British actor of The Last Train (TV series)
- Rodger Bingham, American participant of Survivor: The Australian Outback
