= I Mean Business =

I Mean Business may refer to:

- "I Mean Business", a song from the musical The Devil Wears Prada
- I Mean Business, an album by Bobby Pinson
- Leighann Lord: I Mean Business, a television special by Leighann Lord
