= Neil deGrasse Tyson =

American astrophysicist (born 1958)

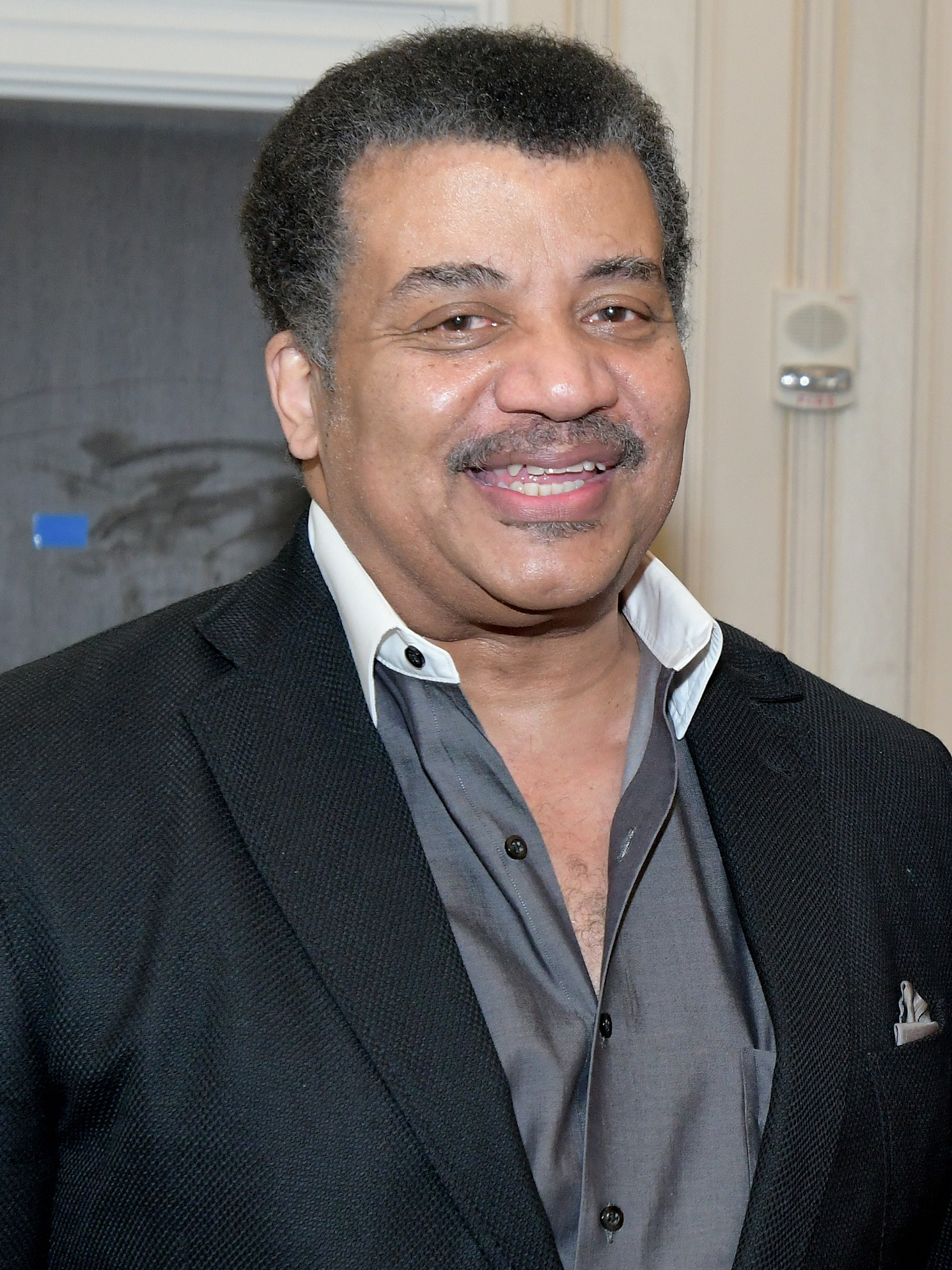
- Tyson in 2023
- Born: October 5, 1958 (age 68); New York City, U.S.
- Education: Harvard University (BA); University of Texas at Austin (MA); Columbia University (MPhil, PhD)
- Spouse: Alice Young (m. 1988)
- Children: 2
- Awards: NASA Distinguished Public Service Medal (2004); Klopsteg Memorial Award (2007); Public Welfare Medal (2015)
- Scientific career
- Fields: Astrophysics; science communication
- Workplaces: University of Maryland, College Park; Princeton University; American Museum of Natural History
- Thesis: A Study of the Abundance Distributions Along the Minor Axis of the Galactic Bulge (1992)
- Doctoral advisor: R. Michael Rich

YouTube information
- Channel: StarTalk
- Years active: 2010–present
- Subscribers: 5.73 million
- Views: 1.022 billion
- Last updated: 24 June 2026

Neil deGrasse Tyson (US: /dəˈɡræs/ də-GRASS; born October 5, 1958) is an American astrophysicist, author, and science communicator. Tyson studied at Harvard University, the University of Texas at Austin, and Columbia University. From 1991 to 1994, he was a postdoctoral research associate at Princeton University. In 1994, he joined the Hayden Planetarium as a staff scientist and the Princeton faculty as a visiting research scientist and lecturer. In 1996, he became director of the planetarium and oversaw its $210 million reconstruction project, which was completed in 2000. Since 1996, he has been the director of the Hayden Planetarium at the Rose Center for Earth and Space in New York City. The center is part of the American Museum of Natural History, where Tyson founded the Department of Astrophysics in 1997 and has been a research associate in the department since 2003.

From 1995 to 2005, Tyson wrote monthly essays in the "Universe" column for Natural History magazine, some of which were later published in his books Death by Black Hole (2007) and Astrophysics for People in a Hurry (2017). During the same period, he wrote a monthly column in StarDate magazine, answering questions about the universe under the pen name "Merlin". Material from the column appeared in his books Merlin's Tour of the Universe (1989) and Just Visiting This Planet (1998). Tyson served on a 2001 government commission on the future of the U.S. aerospace industry and on the 2004 Moon, Mars and Beyond commission. He was awarded the NASA Distinguished Public Service Medal in the same year. From 2006 to 2011, he hosted the television show NOVA ScienceNow on PBS. Since 2009, Tyson has hosted the weekly podcast StarTalk. A spin-off, also called StarTalk, began airing on National Geographic in 2015. In 2014, he hosted the television series Cosmos: A Spacetime Odyssey, a successor to Carl Sagan's 1980 series Cosmos: A Personal Voyage. The U.S. National Academy of Sciences awarded Tyson the Public Welfare Medal in 2015 for his "extraordinary role in exciting the public about the wonders of science".

== Early life and education ==
Tyson was born in Manhattan as the second of three children, into a Catholic family living in the Bronx. His African-American father, Cyril deGrasse Tyson (1927–2016), was a sociologist and human resource commissioner for New York City mayor John Lindsay, and the first director of Harlem Youth Opportunities Unlimited. His mother, Sunchita Maria Tyson (née Feliciano; 1928–2023), was a gerontologist for the U.S. Department of Health, Education and Welfare and was of Puerto Rican descent. Neil has two siblings: Stephen Joseph Tyson and Lynn Antipas Tyson. Neil's middle name, deGrasse, is from the maiden name of his paternal grandmother, who was born as Altima de Grasse in the British West Indies island of Nevis.

Tyson grew up in the Castle Hill neighborhood of the Bronx and then in Riverdale. From kindergarten throughout high school, Tyson attended public schools in the Bronx: PS 36 Unionport, PS 81 Robert J. Christen, the Riverdale Kingsbridge Academy (MS 141), and graduated from The Bronx High School of Science in 1976 where he was captain of the wrestling team and editor-in-chief of the Physical Science Journal. His interest in astronomy began at the age of nine after visiting the sky theater of the Hayden Planetarium. He recalled that "so strong was that imprint [of the night sky] that I'm certain that I had no choice in the matter, that in fact, the universe called me." During high school, Tyson attended astronomy courses offered by the Hayden Planetarium, which he called "the most formative period" of his life. He credited Mark Chartrand III, director of the planetarium at the time, as his "first intellectual role model" and his enthusiastic teaching style mixed with humor inspired Tyson to communicate the universe to others the way he did.

When he was 14, he received a scholarship from the Explorers Club of New York to view the June 1973 total solar eclipse aboard the SS Canberra. The scientific cruise carried two thousand scientists, engineers, and enthusiasts, including Neil Armstrong, Scott Carpenter, and Isaac Asimov.

Tyson obsessively studied astronomy in his teen years; he eventually even gained some fame in the astronomy community by giving lectures on the subject at the age of 15. Astronomer Carl Sagan, who was a faculty member at Cornell University, sought to recruit Tyson to Cornell for undergraduate studies. In his book The Sky Is Not the Limit, Tyson wrote:

My letter of application had been dripping with an interest in the universe. The admission office, unbeknownst to me, had forwarded my application to Carl Sagan's attention. Within weeks, I received a personal letter...

Tyson revisited this moment on his first episode of Cosmos: A Spacetime Odyssey. Pulling out a 1975 calendar belonging to the famous astronomer, he found the day Sagan invited the 17-year-old to spend a day in Ithaca. Sagan had offered to put him up for the night if his bus back to the Bronx did not come. Tyson said, "I already knew I wanted to become a scientist. But that afternoon, I learned from Carl the kind of person I wanted to become."

Tyson chose to attend Harvard where he majored in physics and lived in Currier House. He was a member of the rowing team during his freshman year, but returned to wrestling, lettering (achieving varsity team rank) in his senior year. He was also active in dance (styles including jazz, ballet, Afro-Caribbean, and Latin Ballroom).

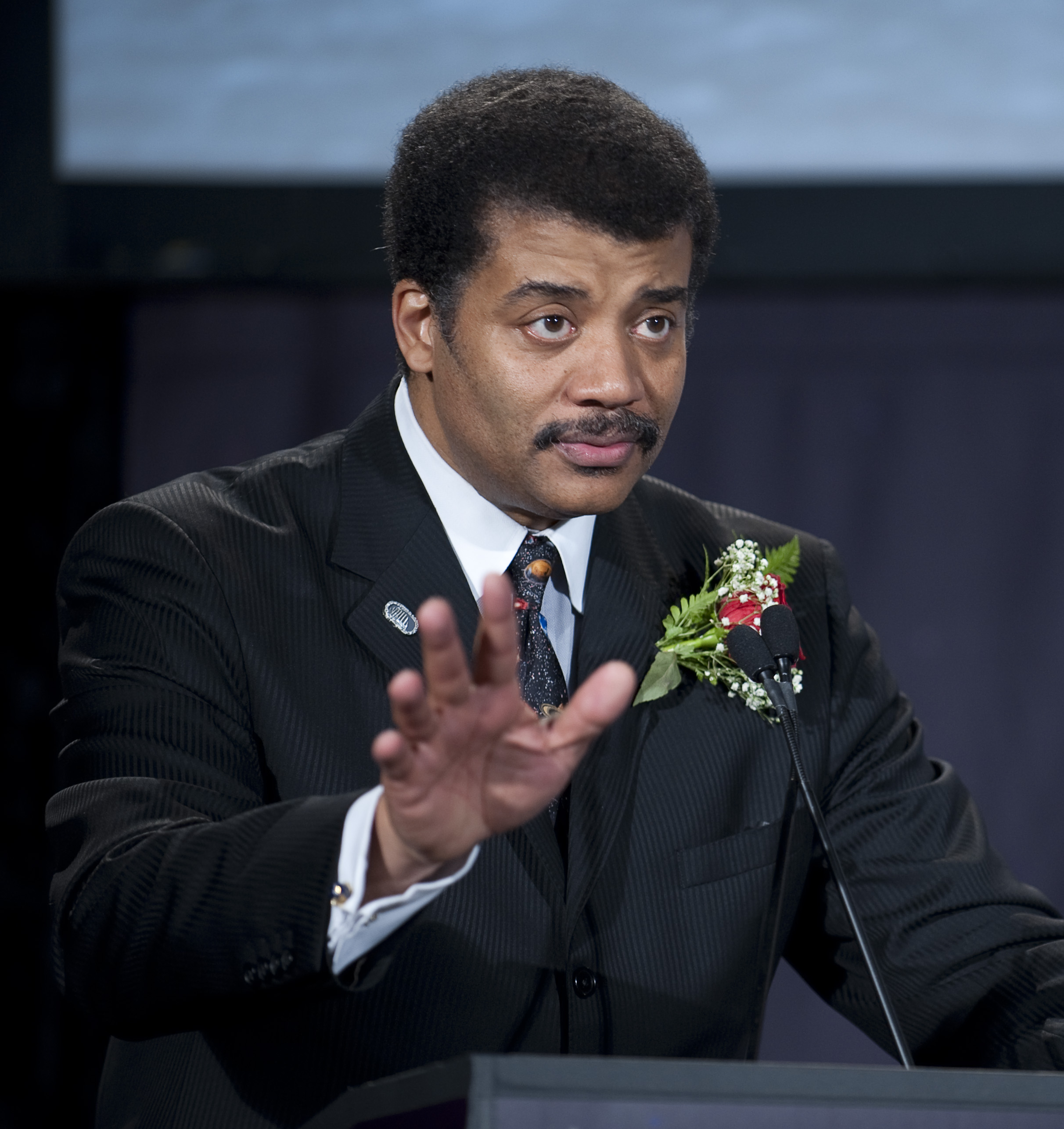
Tyson hosting the 40th anniversary celebration of Apollo 11 at the National Air and Space Museum in Washington, July 2009

Tyson earned a Bachelor of Arts degree in physics at Harvard College in 1980 and then began his graduate work at the University of Texas at Austin, from which he received a Master of Arts degree in astronomy in 1983. By his own account, he did not spend as much time in the research lab as he should have. His professors encouraged him to consider alternative careers and the committee for his doctoral dissertation was dissolved, ending his pursuit of a doctorate from the University of Texas.

Tyson was a lecturer in astronomy at the University of Maryland from 1986 to 1987 and in 1988, he was accepted into the astronomy graduate program at Columbia University, where he earned a Master of Philosophy degree in astrophysics in 1989, and a PhD degree in astrophysics in 1991 under the supervision of Professor R. Michael Rich. Rich obtained funding to support Tyson's doctoral research from NASA and the ARCS Foundation, enabling Tyson to attend international meetings in Italy, Switzerland, Chile, and South Africa and to hire students to help him with data reduction. In the course of his thesis work, he observed using the 0.91 m telescope at the Cerro Tololo Inter-American Observatory in Chile, where he obtained images for the Calán/Tololo Supernova Survey helping to further their work in establishing Type Ia supernovae as standard candles.

During his thesis research at Columbia University, Tyson became acquainted with Professor David Spergel at Princeton University, who visited Columbia University in the course of collaborating with his thesis advisor on the Galactic bulge typically found in spiral galaxies.

== Career ==
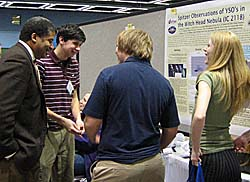
Tyson with students at the 2007 American Astronomical Society conference

Tyson's research has focused on observations in cosmology, stellar evolution, galactic astronomy, bulges, and stellar formation. He has held numerous positions at institutions including the University of Maryland, Princeton University, the American Museum of Natural History, and the Hayden Planetarium.

In 1994, Tyson joined the Hayden Planetarium as a staff scientist while he was a research affiliate in Princeton University. He became acting director of the planetarium in June 1995 and was appointed director in 1996. As director, he oversaw the planetarium's $210 million reconstruction project, which was completed in 2000. Upon being asked for his thoughts on becoming director, Tyson said "when I was a kid... there were scientists and educators on the staff at the Hayden Planetarium... who invested their time and energy in my enlightenment... and I've never forgotten that... to end up back there as its director, I feel this deep sense of duty, that I serve in the same capacity for people who come through the facility today, that others served for me".

Tyson has written a number of popular books on astrophysics. In 1995, he began to write the "Universe" column for Natural History magazine. In a column Tyson wrote for a special edition of the magazine, called "City of Stars", in 2002, he popularized the term "Manhattanhenge" to describe the two days annually on which the evening sun aligns with the street grid in Manhattan, making the sunset visible along unobstructed side streets. He had coined the term in 1996, inspired by how the phenomenon recalls the sun's solstice alignment with the Stonehenge monument in England. Tyson's column also influenced his work as a professor with The Great Courses.

In 2001, U.S. President George W. Bush appointed Tyson to serve on the Commission on the Future of the United States Aerospace Industry and in 2004 to serve on the President's Commission on Implementation of United States Space Exploration Policy, the latter better known as the "Moon, Mars, and Beyond" commission. Soon afterward, he was awarded the NASA Distinguished Public Service Medal, the highest civilian honor bestowed by NASA.

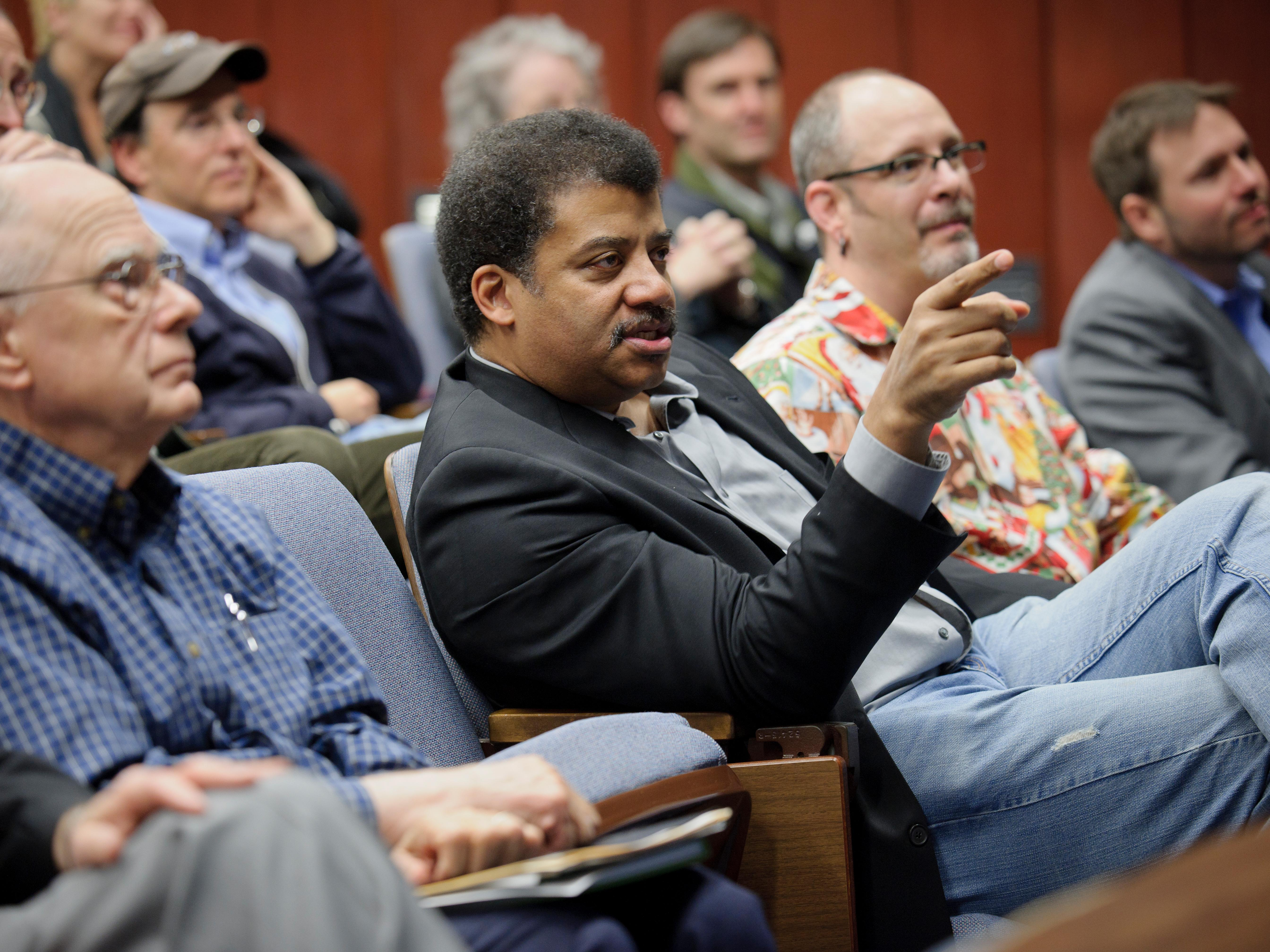
Tyson in December 2011 at a conference marking 1,000 days after the launch of the spacecraft Kepler

In 2004, Tyson hosted the four-part Origins miniseries of the PBS Nova series and with Donald Goldsmith, co-authored the companion volume for this series, Origins: Fourteen Billion Years Of Cosmic Evolution. He again collaborated with Goldsmith as the narrator on the documentary 400 Years of the Telescope, which premiered on PBS in April 2009.

As director of the Hayden Planetarium, Tyson bucked traditional thinking in order to keep Pluto from being referred to as the ninth planet in exhibits at the center. He has explained that he wanted to look at commonalities between objects, grouping the terrestrial planets together, the gas giants together, and Pluto with like objects, and to get away from simply counting the planets. He has stated on The Colbert Report, The Daily Show, and BBC Horizon that the decision has resulted in large amounts of hate mail, much of it from children. In 2006, the International Astronomical Union (IAU) confirmed this assessment by changing Pluto to the dwarf planet classification.

Tyson recounted the heated online debate on the Cambridge Conference Network (CCNet), a "widely read, UK-based Internet chat group", following Benny Peiser's renewed call for reclassification of Pluto's status. Peiser's entry, in which he posted articles from the AP and The Boston Globe, spawned from The New York Times's article entitled "Pluto's Not a Planet? Only in New York".

Tyson has been vice-president, president, and chairman of the board of the Planetary Society. He was also the host of the PBS program Nova ScienceNow until 2011. He attended and was a speaker at the Beyond Belief: Science, Religion, Reason and Survival symposium in November 2006.

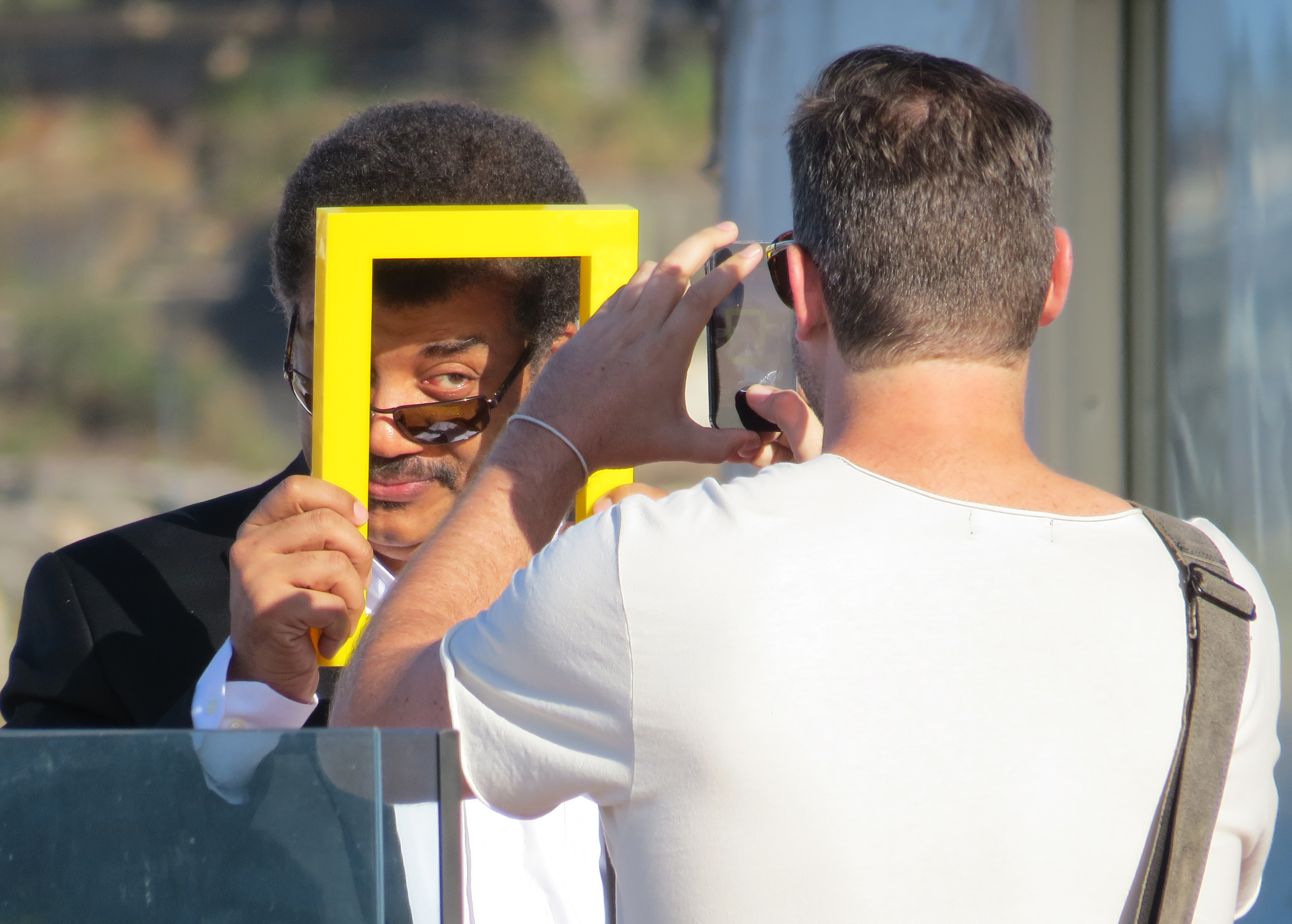
Tyson promoting the Cosmos TV series in Australia for National Geographic, 2014

In May 2009, Tyson launched a one-hour radio talk show called StarTalk, which he co-hosted with comedian Lynne Koplitz. The show was syndicated on Sunday afternoons on KTLK AM in Los Angeles and WHFS in Washington DC. The show lasted for thirteen weeks, but was resurrected in December 2010 and then, co-hosted with comedians Chuck Nice and Leighann Lord instead of Koplitz. Guests range from colleagues in science to celebrities such as GZA, Wil Wheaton, Sarah Silverman, and Bill Maher. The show is available via the Internet through a live stream or in the form of a podcast.

In April 2011, Tyson was the keynote speaker at the 93rd International Convention of the Phi Theta Kappa International Honor Society of the Two-year School. He and James Randi delivered a lecture entitled Skepticism, which related directly with the convention's theme of The Democratization of Information: Power, Peril, and Promise.

In 2012, Tyson announced that he would appear in a YouTube series based on his radio show StarTalk. It was distributed on the Nerdist YouTube Channel for a while until StarTalk became its own dedicated YouTube channel. On February 28, 2014, Tyson was a celebrity guest at the White House Student Film Festival.

In 2014, Tyson helped revive Carl Sagan's Cosmos: A Personal Voyage television series, presenting Cosmos: A Spacetime Odyssey on both FOX and the National Geographic Channel. Thirteen episodes were aired in the first season, and Tyson has said that if a second season were produced, he would pass the role of host to someone else in the science world. On March 9, 2020, he returned with a follow-up season of Cosmos titled Cosmos: Possible Worlds.

On April 20, 2015, Tyson began hosting a late-night talk show entitled StarTalk on the National Geographic Channel, where he interviews pop culture celebrities and asks them about their life experiences with science. Around 2016, he was co-developing a sandbox video game with Whatnot Entertainment, Neil deGrasse Tyson Presents: Space Odyssey, which aimed to help provide players with a realistic simulation of developing a space-faring culture, incorporating educational materials about space and technology. The development was abandoned after April 2020.

== Views ==
=== Spirituality and philosophy ===
[A] most important feature is the analysis of the information that comes your way. And that's what I don't see enough of in this world. There's a level of gullibility that leaves people susceptible to being taken advantage of. I see science literacy as kind of a vaccine against charlatans who would try to exploit your ignorance.

— Neil deGrasse Tyson, from a transcript of an interview by Roger Bingham on The Science Network

Tyson has written and broadcast extensively about his views of science, spirituality, and the spirituality of science, including the essays "The Perimeter of Ignorance" and "Holy Wars", both appearing in Natural History magazine and the 2006 Beyond Belief workshop. In an interview with comedian Paul Mecurio, Tyson offered his definition of spirituality, "For me, when I say spiritual, I'm referring to a feeling you would have that connects you to the universe in a way that it may defy simple vocabulary. We think about the universe as an intellectual playground, which it surely is, but the moment you learn something that touches an emotion rather than just something intellectual, I would call that a spiritual encounter with the universe." He has argued that many great historical scientists' belief in intelligent design limited their scientific inquiries, to the detriment of the advance of scientific knowledge.

When asked during a question session at the University at Buffalo if he believed in a higher power, Tyson responded: "Every account of a higher power that I've seen described, of all religions that I've seen, include many statements with regard to the benevolence of that power. When I look at the universe and all the ways the universe wants to kill us, I find it hard to reconcile that with statements of beneficence." In an interview with Big Think, he said: "So, what people are really after is what is my stance on religion or spirituality or God, and I would say if I find a word that came closest, it would be 'agnostic'... at the end of the day I'd rather not be any category at all." Additionally, in the same interview with Big Think, Tyson mentioned that he edited Wikipedia's entry on him to include the fact that he is an agnostic:

I'm constantly claimed by atheists. I find this intriguing. In fact, on my Wiki page –I didn't create the Wiki page. Others did, and I'm flattered that people cared enough about my life to assemble it–and it said, "Neil deGrasse Tyson is an atheist." I said, "Well, that's not really true." I said, "Neil deGrasse Tyson is an agnostic." I went back a week later. It said, "Neil deGrasse Tyson is an atheist" again–within a week!–and I said, "What's up with that?" and I said, "All right, I have to word it a little differently." So I said, "Okay, Neil deGrasse Tyson, widely claimed by atheists, is actually an agnostic."

During the interview "Called by the Universe: A Conversation with Neil deGrasse Tyson" in 2009, Tyson said: "I can't agree to the claims by atheists that I'm one of that community. I don't have the time, energy, interest of conducting myself that way... I'm not trying to convert people. I don't care."

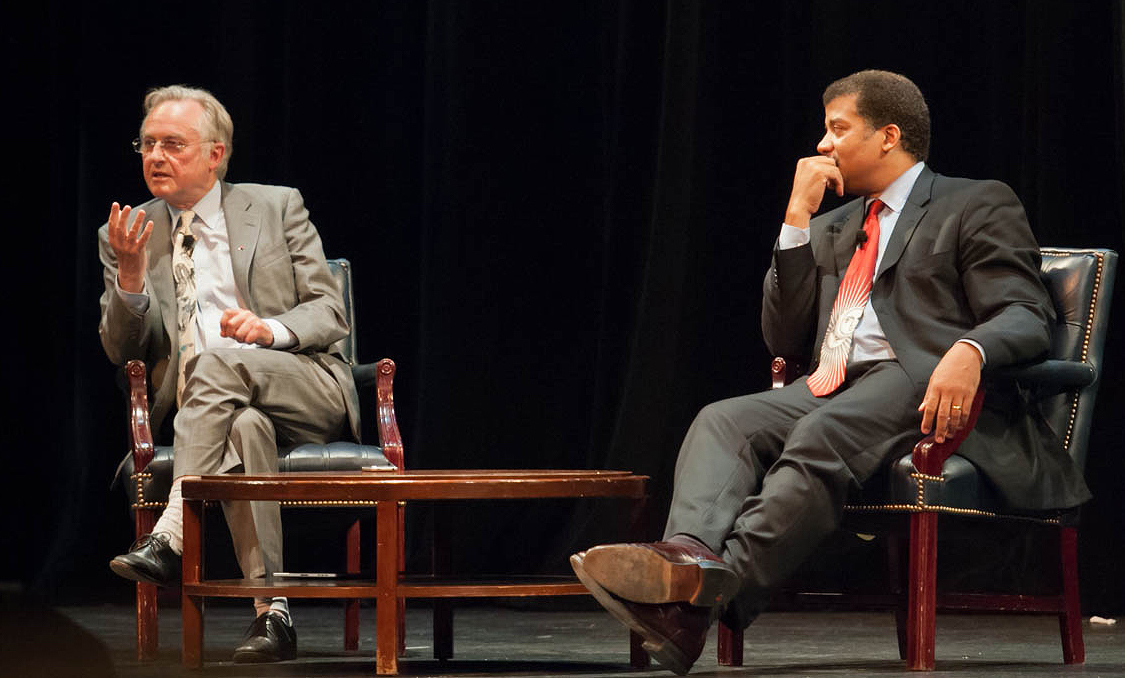
Tyson in conversation with Richard Dawkins at Howard University, 2010

In March 2014, philosopher and secularism proponent Massimo Pigliucci asked Tyson: "What is it you think about God?" Tyson replied: "I remain unconvinced by any claims anyone has ever made about the existence or the power of a divine force operating in the universe." Pigliucci then asked him why he expressed discomfort with the label "atheist" in his Big Think video. Tyson replied by reiterating his dislike for one-word labels, saying: "That's what adjectives are for. What kind of atheist are you? Are you an ardent atheist? Are you a passive atheist? An apathetic atheist? Do you rally, or do you just not even care? So I'd be on the 'I really don't care' side of that, if you had to find adjectives to put in front of the word 'atheist'."

Pigliucci contrasted Tyson with scientist Richard Dawkins: "[Dawkins] really does consider, at this point, himself to be an atheist activist. You very clearly made the point that you are not." Tyson replied: "I completely respect that activity. He's fulfilling a really important role out there." Tyson has spoken about philosophy on numerous occasions. In March 2014, during an episode of The Nerdist Podcast, he said that philosophy is "useless" and that a philosophy major "can really mess you up", which some criticized.

=== Race and social justice ===
In 2005, at a conference at the National Academy of Sciences, Tyson responded to a question about whether genetic differences might keep women from working as scientists. He said that his goal to become an astrophysicist was "hands down the path of most resistance through the forces... of society... My life experience tells me, when you don't find Blacks in the sciences, when you don't find women in the sciences, I know these forces are real and I had to survive them in order to get where I am today. So before we start talking about genetic differences, you gotta come up with a system where there's equal opportunity. Then we can start having that conversation."

In a 2014 interview with Grantland, Tyson said that he related his experience on that 2005 panel in an effort to make the point that the scientific question about genetic differences can not be answered until the social barriers are dismantled. "I'm saying before you even have that conversation, you have to be really sure that access to opportunity has been level." In the same interview, Tyson said that race is not a part of the point he is trying to make in his career or with his life. According to Tyson, "[T]hat then becomes the point of people's understanding of me, rather than the astrophysics. So it's a failed educational step for that to be the case. If you end up being distracted by that and not [getting] the message." He purposefully no longer speaks publicly about race. "I don't give talks on it. I don't even give Black History Month talks. I decline every single one of them. In fact, since 1993, I've declined every interview that has my being black as a premise of the interview."

Tyson has advocated for the freedoms of homosexual and transgender people and argued about the topic repeatedly against right-wing commentators.

=== NASA ===
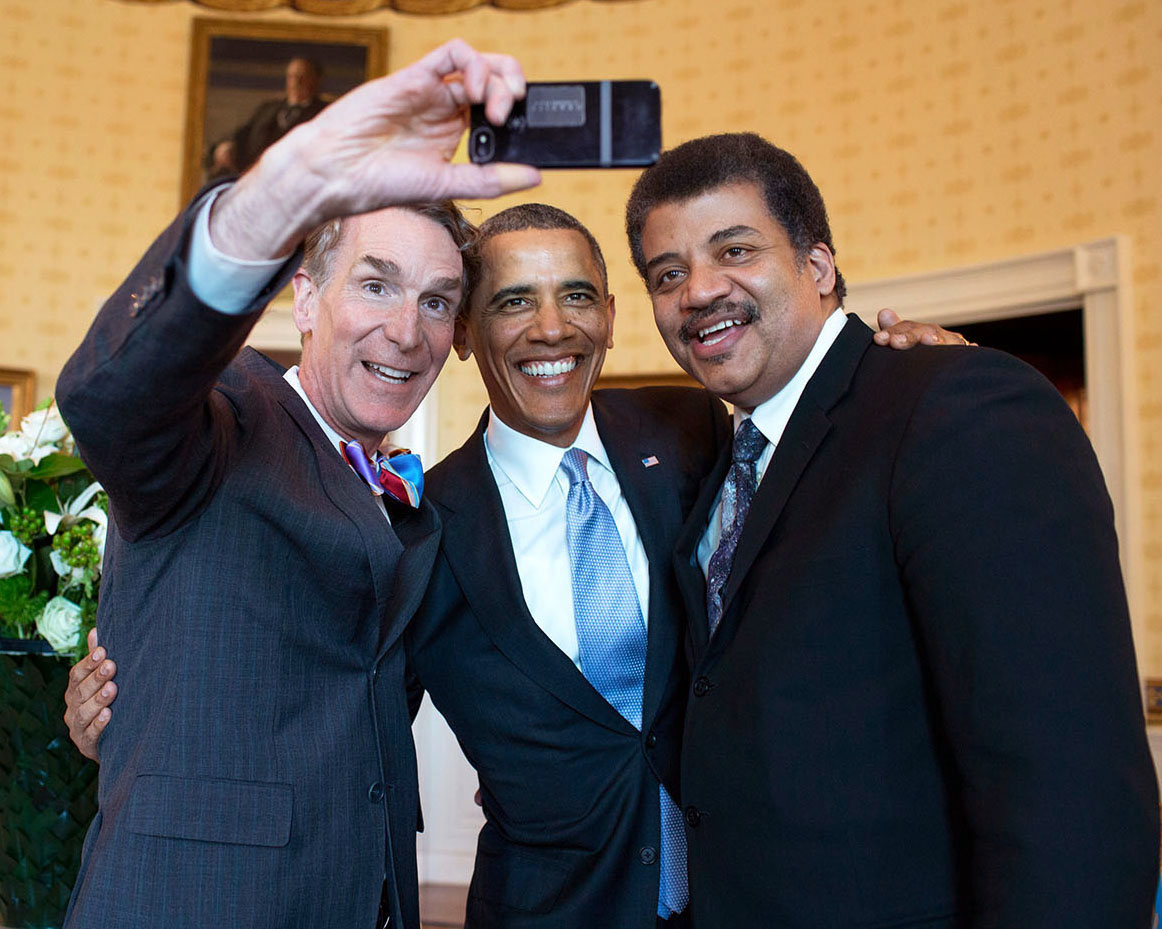
Tyson, Bill Nye, and U.S. President Barack Obama take a selfie at the White House, 2014.

Tyson is an advocate for expanding the operations of the National Aeronautics and Space Administration. Arguing that "the most powerful agency on the dreams of a nation is currently underfunded to do what it needs to be doing". He has suggested that the general public has a tendency to overestimate how much revenue is allocated to the space agency. At a March 2010 address, referencing the proportion of tax revenue spent on NASA, he stated, "By the way, how much does NASA cost? It's a half a penny on the dollar. Did you know that? The people are saying, 'Why are we spending money up there...' I ask them, 'How much do you think we're spending?' They say 'five cents, ten cents on a dollar.' It's a half a penny."

In March 2012, Tyson testified before the United States Senate Science Committee, stating that:

Right now, NASA's annual budget is half a penny on your tax dollar. For twice that—a penny on a dollar—we can transform the country from a sullen, dispirited nation, weary of economic struggle, to one where it has reclaimed its 20th century birthright to dream of tomorrow.

Inspired by Tyson's advocacy and remarks, Penny4NASA, a campaign of the Space Advocates nonprofit was founded in 2012 by John Zeller and advocates doubling NASA's budget to one percent of the federal budget.

In his book Space Chronicles: Facing the Ultimate Frontier Tyson argues that large and ambitious space exploration projects, like getting humans to Mars, will probably require some sort of military or economic driver in order to get the appropriate funding from the United States federal government.

== Media appearances ==
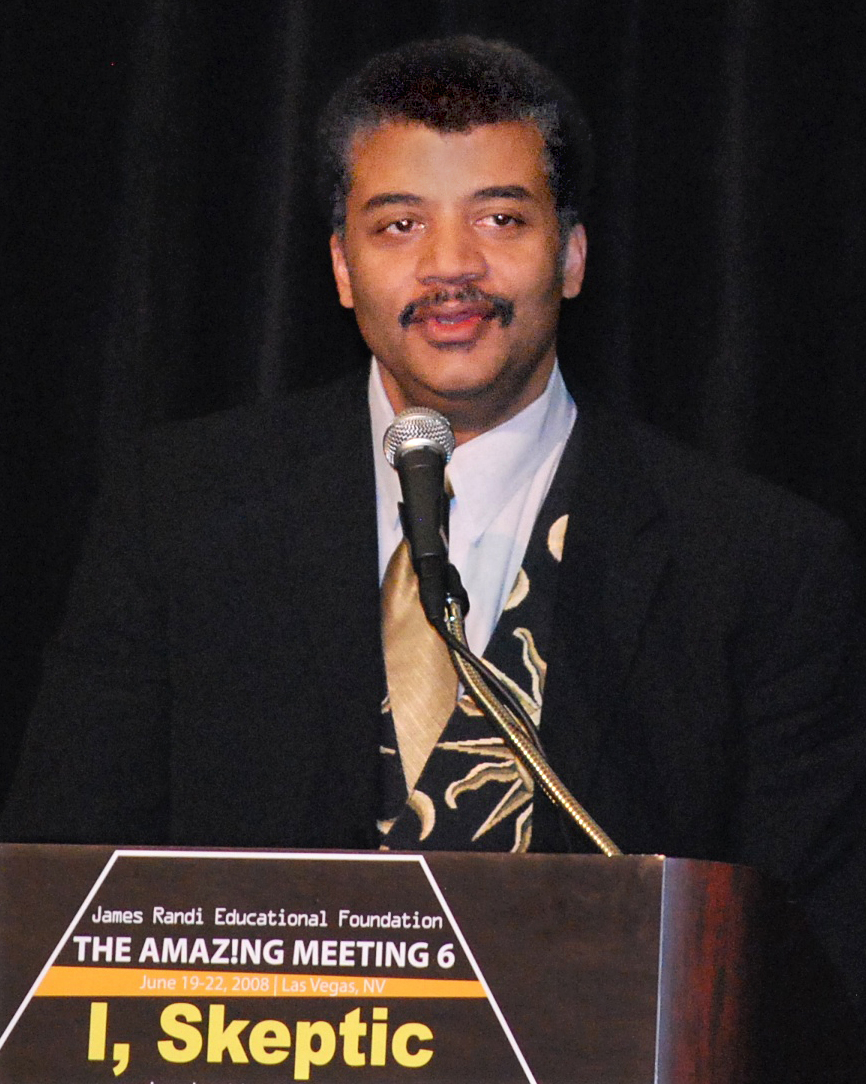
Neil deGrasse Tyson was the keynote speaker at TAM6 of the JREF.

As a science communicator, Tyson regularly appears on television, radio, and various other media outlets. He has been a regular guest on The Colbert Report, and host Stephen Colbert refers to him in his comedic book I Am America (And So Can You!), noting in his chapter on scientists that most scientists are "decent, well-intentioned people", but presumably tongue-in-cheek, that "Neil DeGrasse [sic] Tyson is an absolute monster."

He has appeared numerous times on The Daily Show with Jon Stewart. He has made appearances on Late Night with Conan O'Brien, The Tonight Show with Jay Leno, Late Night with Jimmy Fallon, and The Rachel Maddow Show. He served as one of the central interviewees on the various episodes of the History Channel science program, The Universe. Tyson participated on the NPR radio quiz program Wait Wait... Don't Tell Me! in 2007 and 2015. He appeared several times on Real Time with Bill Maher and he was also featured on an episode of Who Wants to Be a Millionaire? as the ask-the-expert lifeline. He has spoken numerous times on the Philadelphia morning show, Preston and Steve, on 93.3 WMMR, as well as on SiriusXM's Ron and Fez and The Opie and Anthony Show.

Tyson has been featured as a podcast guest interviewee on The Skeptics' Guide to the Universe, Radiolab, Skepticality, and The Joe Rogan Experience, and he has been in several of the Symphony of Science videos. He lived near the World Trade Center and was an eyewitness to the September 11, 2001, attacks. He wrote a widely circulated letter on what he saw. Footage he filmed on the day was included in the 2008 documentary film 102 Minutes That Changed America.

In 2007, Tyson was the keynote speaker during the dedication ceremony of Deerfield Academy's new science center, the Koch Center in Massachusetts, named for David H. Koch '59. He emphasized the impact science will have on the twenty-first century, as well as explaining that investments into science may be costly, but their returns in the form of knowledge gained and piquing interest is invaluable. He has also appeared as the keynote speaker at The Amazing Meeting, a science and skepticism conference hosted by the James Randi Educational Foundation.

Tyson made a guest appearance as a version of himself in the episode "Brain Storm" of Stargate Atlantis alongside Bill Nye and in the episode "The Apology Insufficiency" of The Big Bang Theory. Archive footage of him is used in the film Europa Report. Tyson also made an appearance in an episode of Martha Speaks as himself.

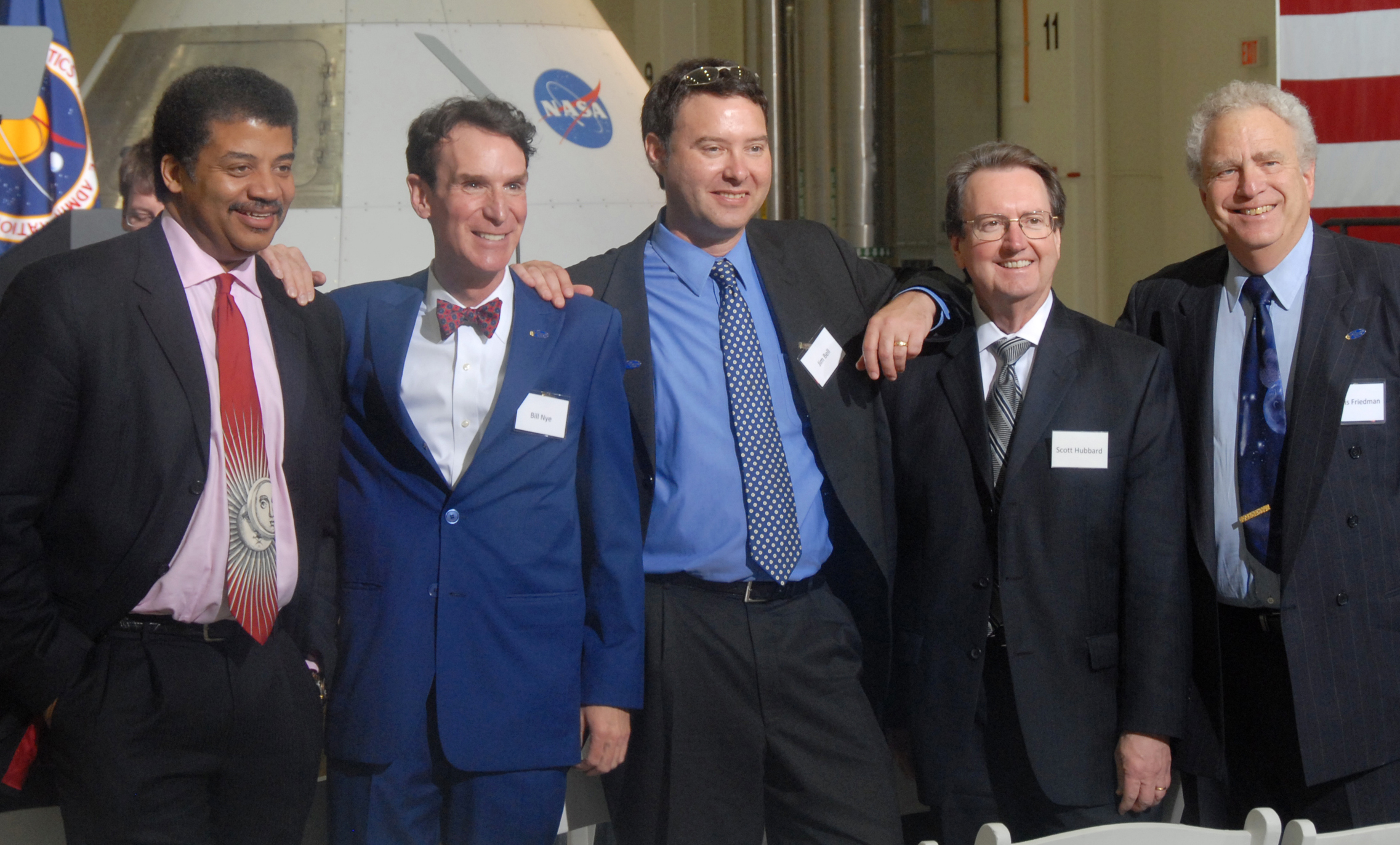
2010 Space Conference group portrait (from left): Tyson, Bill Nye, Jim Bell, Scott Hubbard, and Lou Friedman

In a May 2011 StarTalk Radio show, The Political Science of the Daily Show, Tyson said he donates all income earned as a guest speaker. he is a frequent participant in the website Reddit's AMAs (Ask Me Anythings) where he is responsible for three of the top ten most popular AMAs of all time.

In Action Comics #14 (January 2013), which was published November 7, 2012, Tyson appears in the story, in which he determines that Superman's home planet, Krypton, orbited the red dwarf LHS 2520 in the constellation Corvus 27.1 lightyears from Earth. He assisted DC Comics in selecting a real-life star that would be an appropriate parent star to Krypton, and picked Corvus, which is Latin for "Crow", and which is the mascot of Superman's high school, the Smallville Crows. Tyson also had a minor appearance as himself in the 2016 film Batman v Superman: Dawn of Justice.

In May 2013, the Science Laureates of the United States Act of 2013 (H.R. 1891; 113th Congress) was introduced into Congress. Tyson was listed by at least two commentators as a possible nominee for the position of Science Laureate, if the act were to pass. On March 8, 2014, Tyson made a SXSW Interactive keynote presentation at the Austin Convention Center. On June 3, 2014, he co-reviewed Gravity in a CinemaSins episode. He made two more appearances with CinemaSins, co-reviewing Interstellar on September 29, 2015, and The Martian on March 31, 2016.

In 2016, Tyson narrated and was a script supervisor for the science documentary Food Evolution, directed by Academy Award–nominated director Scott Hamilton Kennedy. In the same year, Tyson made a guest appearance on the Avenged Sevenfold album The Stage, where he delivered a monolog on the track "Exist". In 2017, Tyson appeared on Logic's album Everybody as God, uncredited on various tracks, and credited on the song "AfricAryaN" as well as on "The Moon" on Musiq Soulchild's album Feel the Real.

In 2018, Tyson made a second guest appearance on The Big Bang Theory as himself, together with fellow television personality Bill Nye, in the first episode of the show's final season ("The Conjugal Configuration"). He also had guest appearances in Gravity Falls, Brooklyn Nine-Nine, Zoolander 2, Ice Age: Collision Course, Family Guy, BoJack Horseman, The Simpsons, Salvation and Scooby-Doo and Guess Who?.

== Personal life ==
Tyson lives in the Tribeca neighborhood of Lower Manhattan with his wife, Alice Young. They have two children, Miranda and Travis. Neil met his wife in a physics class at the University of Texas at Austin. They married in 1988 and named their first child Miranda after the smallest of Uranus' five major moons. Tyson is a wine enthusiast whose collection was featured in the May 2000 issue of the Wine Spectator and the Spring 2005 issue of The World of Fine Wine.

== Sexual misconduct allegations ==
During November and December 2018, Tyson was accused of rape by a woman while an additional three women alleged inappropriate sexual advances. Tchiya Amet El Maat accused Tyson of drugging and raping her while both were graduate students at UT Austin in 1984. Katelyn Allers, a professor at Bucknell University, alleged Tyson touched her inappropriately at a 2009 American Astronomical Society gathering. Ashley Watson, Tyson's assistant on Cosmos, alleged Tyson made inappropriate sexual advances to her in 2018 which led her to resign from the position days later. In what Tyson described as a Native American handshake, he held her hand and looked her in the eye for 10 seconds. When she left, he told her he wanted to hug her but would rather not in case he wanted more. A fourth anonymous woman alleged Tyson made inappropriate comments to her during a 2010 holiday party at the American Museum of Natural History. Tyson denied El Maat's rape accusation, while corroborating the basic facts around the situation of Allers and Watson's assertions, but claimed his actions were misinterpreted and apologized for any misunderstanding or offense.

Fox, National Geographic, the Museum of Natural History, and the producers of Cosmos announced investigations, which Tyson said that he welcomed. The National Geographic Channel announced on January 3, 2019, that they were putting further episodes of StarTalk on hiatus so as "to allow the investigation to occur unimpeded". The premiere of Cosmos: Possible Worlds, initially scheduled for March 3, 2019, was also delayed while the investigation continued. On March 15, 2019, both National Geographic and Fox announced, "The investigation is complete, and we are moving forward with both StarTalk and Cosmos," and that: "There will be no further comment." The networks affirmed that both StarTalk and Cosmos would resume, but that no date had been set. In July, the American Museum of Natural History said that Neil deGrasse Tyson would keep his job as director of the Hayden Planetarium.

== Recognition ==
List of awards received by Tyson:

=== Awards ===
- 2001 Medal of Excellence, Columbia University, New York City
- 2004 NASA Distinguished Public Service Medal
- 2005 Science Writing Award
- 2007 Klopsteg Memorial Award winner
- 2009 Douglas S. Morrow Public Outreach Award from the Space Foundation for significant contributions to public awareness of space programs
- 2009 Isaac Asimov Award from the American Humanist Association
- 2014 Critics' Choice Television Award for Best Reality Show Host
- 2014 Dunlap Prize
- 2015 Public Welfare Medal from the National Academy of Sciences
- 2015 Cosmos Award, Planetary Society
- 2017 Hubbard Medal, National Geographic Society
- 2017 Stephen Hawking Medal for Science Communication, Starmus
- 2018 Grammy Award for Best Spoken Word Album nomination for Astrophysics for People in a Hurry
- 2020 YouTube Gold Creator Award

=== Honors ===
- 2000 Sexiest Astrophysicist Alive, People magazine
- 2001 asteroid named: 13123 Tyson, renamed from Asteroid 1994KA by the International Astronomical Union
- 2001 The Tech 100, voted by editors of Crain's Magazine to be among the 100 most influential technology leaders in New York
- 2004 Fifty Most Important African-Americans in Research Science
- 2007 Harvard 100: Most Influential, Harvard Alumni magazine, Cambridge, Massachusetts
- 2007 The Time 100, voted by the editors of Time magazine as one of the 100 most influential persons in the world
- 2008 Discover Magazine selected him as one of "The 10 Most Influential People in Science"
- 2010 elected a Fellow of the American Physical Society
- 2016 The leaping frog Indirana tysoni was named after him by Neelesh Dahanukar, Nikhil Modak, Keerthi Krutha, P. O. Nameer, Anand D. Padhye, and Sanjay Molur.

=== Honorary doctorates ===
- 1997 York College, City University of New York
- 2000 Ramapo College, Mahwah, New Jersey
- 2000 Dominican College, Orangeburg, New York
- 2001 University of Richmond, Richmond, Virginia
- 2002 Bloomfield College, Bloomfield, New Jersey
- 2003 Northeastern University, Boston, Massachusetts
- 2004 College of Staten Island, City University of New York
- 2006 Pace University, New York City
- 2007 Williams College, Williamstown, Massachusetts
- 2007 Worcester Polytechnic Institute, Worcester, Massachusetts
- 2008 University of Pennsylvania, Philadelphia, Pennsylvania
- 2008 Howard University, Washington, DC
- 2010 University of Alabama in Huntsville, Huntsville, Alabama
- 2010 Rensselaer Polytechnic Institute, Troy, New York
- 2010 Eastern Connecticut State University, Willimantic, Connecticut
- 2011 Gettysburg College, Gettysburg, Pennsylvania
- 2012 Mount Holyoke College, South Hadley, Massachusetts
- 2012 Western New England University, Springfield, Massachusetts
- 2015 University of Massachusetts-Amherst, Amherst, Massachusetts
- 2017 Baruch College, New York, New York
- 2018 Yale University, New Haven, Connecticut
- 2023 Arcadia University, Cheltenham Township, Pennsylvania

== Filmography ==
=== Film ===
Year	Title	Role	Notes
2016	Zoolander 2	Himself	
2016	Batman v Superman: Dawn of Justice	Himself	
2016	Lazer Team	Himself	
2016	Ice Age: Collision Course	Neil deBuck Weasel	Voice
2016	Food Evolution	Narrator	Documentary
2018	The Last Sharknado: It's About Time	Merlin	Television film
2024	This Is Me... Now: A Love Story	Taurus	

=== Television ===
Year	Title	Role	Notes
2006–2011	Nova ScienceNow	Host	
2008	Stargate: Atlantis	Himself	Episode: "Brain Storm"
2010	NOVA	Host	Episode: "The Pluto Files"
2010; 2018	The Big Bang Theory	Himself	2 episodes: "The Apology Insufficiency" "The Conjugal Configuration"
2012	Martha Speaks	Himself	Episode: "Eyes on the Skies"
2012	The Inexplicable Universe: Unsolved Mysteries	Himself	6-part lecture series from The Great Courses
2014	Cosmos: A Spacetime Odyssey	Host	
2014	Gravity Falls	Waddles	Episode: "Little Gift Shop of Horrors"
2015	Brooklyn Nine-Nine	Himself	Episode: "The Swedes"
2015; 2022	Family Guy	Himself	2 episodes: "Scammed Yankees" "Prescription Heroine"
2015–2019	StarTalk	Host	
2015–2026	The Late Show with Stephen Colbert	Himself	22 episodes, including the series finale
2016	BoJack Horseman	Planetarium Narrator	Episode: "That's Too Much, Man!"
2016	100 Things to Do Before High School	Himself	Episode: "Meet Your Idol Thing!"
2016	Future-Worm!	Himself	Episode: "Long Live Captain Cakerz!"
2016	The Jim Gaffigan Show	Himself	Episode: "Jim at the Museum"
2016	Regular Show	Himself	Episode: "Terror Tales of The Park VI"
2016	Mars	Himself	
2017	The Simpsons	Himself	Episode: "The Caper Chase"
2017	Super Science Friends	Himself	Episode: "Nobel of the Ball"
2018	Last Week Tonight with John Oliver	Himself	2 episodes
2020	Scooby-Doo and Guess Who?	Himself	Episode: "Space Station Scooby!"
2020	Cosmos: Possible Worlds	Host	Documentary
2023	Pantheon	Dr. Moore (voice)	Episode: "Apokalypsis"
2024	Futurama	Himself	Episode: "The Futurama Mystery Liberry"
2025	Celebrity Jeopardy!	Himself (Contestant)	

=== Other ===
Year	Title	Role	Notes
2017	Futurama: Worlds of Tomorrow	Himself	Mobile app game

== Discography ==
List of non-single guest appearances, with other performing artists, showing year released and album name
Title	Year	Artist(s)	Album
"Exist"	2016	Avenged Sevenfold	The Stage
"AfricAryaN"	2017	Logic	Everybody

== Works ==
List of works by Tyson:

=== Books ===
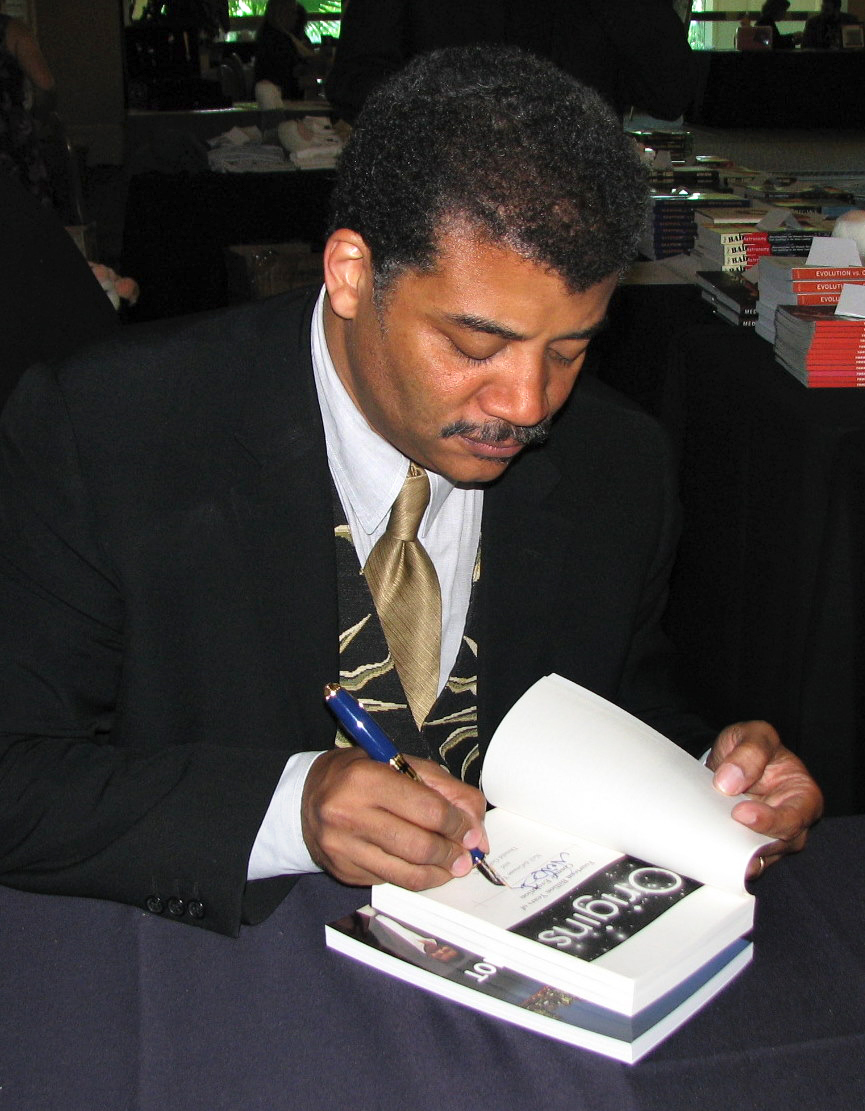
Signing a copy of his book Origins at The Amazing Meeting by the James Randi Educational Foundation, 2008

- Merlin's Tour of the Universe
  - 1st hardcover ed. (1989). ISBN 9780231069243
  - 1st paperback ed. (1997). ISBN 9780385488358.
  - "Revised and Updated for the Twenty-First Century" ed. (2024). ISBN 9781665019859.
- Universe Down to Earth (1994). ISBN 0-231-07560-X.
- Just Visiting This Planet (1998). ISBN 0-385-48837-8.
- One Universe: At Home in the Cosmos (2000). ISBN 0-309-06488-0.
- Cosmic Horizons: Astronomy at the Cutting Edge (2000). ISBN 1-56584-602-8.
- City of Stars: A New Yorker's Guide to the Cosmos (2002)
- My Favorite Universe (a 12-part lecture series) (2003). ISBN 1-56585-663-5.
- Origins: Fourteen Billion Years of Cosmic Evolution (co-authored with Donald Goldsmith) (2004). ISBN 0-393-32758-2.
- The Sky Is Not the Limit: Adventures of an Urban Astrophysicist (2004). ISBN 978-1-59102-188-9.
- Death by Black Hole: And Other Cosmic Quandaries (2007). ISBN 0-393-33016-8.
- The Pluto Files: The Rise and Fall of America's Favorite Planet (2009). ISBN 0-393-06520-0.
- Space Chronicles: Facing the Ultimate Frontier (2012). ISBN 0-393-08210-5.
- Welcome to the Universe: An Astrophysical Tour (co-authored with Michael A. Strauss and J. Richard Gott) (2016). ISBN 978-0691157245.
- Astrophysics for People in a Hurry (2017). ISBN 978-0-393-60939-4.
- Accessory to War: The Unspoken Alliance Between Astrophysics and the Military (2018, with Avis Lang). ISBN 0-393-06444-1.
- Letters from an Astrophysicist (2019). ISBN 978-1324003311.
- Cosmic Queries: StarTalk's Guide to Who We Are, How We Got Here, and Where We're Going (2021). ISBN 978-1-426-22177-4.
- Starry Messenger: Cosmic Perspectives on Civilization (2023). ISBN 978-1-250-86150-4.
- To Infinity and Beyond: A Journey of Cosmic Discovery (2023). ISBN 978-1-426-22330-3. Coauthored with Lindsey Nyx Walker.
- Take Me to Your Leader: Perspectives on Your First Alien Encounter (2026). ISBN 978-1-668-24997-0.
- Lost in Space: 5,000 Facts for Navigating the Universe (2026). ISBN 978-1426224386. Coauthored with Lindsey Nyx Walker.

=== Research publications ===
- Twarog, Bruce A.; Tyson, Neil D. (1985). "UVBY Photometry of Blue Stragglers in NGC 7789". Astronomical Journal 90: 1247. doi:10.1086/113833.
- Tyson, Neil D.; Scalo, John M. (1988). "Bursting Dwarf Galaxies: Implications for Luminosity Function, Space Density, and Cosmological Mass Density". Astrophysical Journal 329: 618. doi:10.1086/166408.
- Tyson, Neil D. (1988). "On the possibility of Gas-Rich Dwarf Galaxies in the Lyman-alpha Forest". Astrophysical Journal (Letters) 329: L57. doi:10.1086/185176.
- Tyson, Neil D.; Rich, Michael (1991). "Radial Velocity Distribution and Line Strengths of 33 Carbon Stars in the Galactic Bulge". Astrophysical Journal 367: 547. doi:10.1086/169651.
- Tyson, Neil D.; Gal, Roy R. (1993). "An Exposure Guide for Taking Twilight Flatfields with Large Format CCDs". Astronomical Journal 105: 1206. doi:10.1086/116505.
- Tyson, Neil D.; Richmond, Michael W.; Woodhams, Michael; Ciotti, Luca (1993). "On the Possibility of a Major Impact on Uranus in the Past Century". Astronomy & Astrophysics (Research Notes) 275: 630.
- Schmidt, B. P., et al. (1994). "The Expanding Photosphere Method Applied to SN1992am at cz = 14600 km/s". Astronomical Journal 107: 1444.
- Wells, L. A. et al. (1994). "The Type Ia Supernova 1989B in NGC3627 (M66)". Astronomical Journal 108: 2233. doi:10.1086/117236.
- Hamuy, M. et al. (1996). "BVRI Light Curves For 29 Type Ia Supernovae". Astronomical Journal 112: 2408. doi:10.1086/118192.
- Lira, P. et al. (1998). "Optical light curves of the Type IA supernovae SN 1990N and 1991T". Astronomical Journal 116: 1006. doi:10.1086/300175.
- Scoville, N. et al. (2007). "The Cosmic Evolution Survey (COSMOS): Overview". Astrophysical Journal Supplement 172: 1. doi:10.1086/516585.
- Scoville, N. et al. (2007). "COSMOS: Hubble Space Telescope Observations". Astrophysical Journal Supplement 172: 38. doi:10.1086/516580.
- Liu, C. T.; Capak, P.; Mobasher, B.; Paglione, T. A. D.; Scoville, N. Z.; Tribiano, S. M.; Tyson, N. D. (2008). "The Faint-End Slopes of Galaxy Luminosity Functions in the COSMOS Field". Astrophysical Journal Letters 672: 198. doi:10.1086/522361.
