= StarTalk (American talk show) =

2015 American television talk show

- Genre: Talk show
- Presented by: Neil deGrasse Tyson
- Country of origin: United States
- Original language: English
- No. of seasons: 5
- No. of episodes: 76

Original release
- Network: National Geographic
- Release: April 20, 2015 – May 16, 2019

StarTalk is an American television talk show hosted by Neil deGrasse Tyson that aired weekly on National Geographic. StarTalk is a spin-off of the podcast of the same name, in which Tyson discusses scientific topics through one-on-one interviews and panel discussions. Space.com called it the "first-ever science-themed late-night talk show." The series premiered on April 20, 2015.

== Format ==
The format of the show broadly follows the format of the podcast. This consists of a pre-taped discussion between Tyson and the guest of the week, which is shown in segments interspersed with the segments filmed in front of the live audience. Those segments consist of a discussion between Tyson, a specialist related to the guest's area of expertise, and a comedian (most commonly Chuck Nice or Eugene Mirman or Maeve Higgins). Near the end of the episode, a short taped segment of Bill Nye, giving his view of the episode's topic, is often aired.

== Episodes ==
=== Season 1 (2015) ===
No.	Guest(s)	Original release date	U.S. viewers (millions)
1	George Takei	April 20, 2015	N/A
2	Christopher Nolan	April 27, 2015	0.138
3	Dan Savage	May 4, 2015	N/A
4	Arianna Huffington	May 11, 2015	0.151
5	Richard Dawkins	May 18, 2015	N/A
6	Jimmy Carter	May 25, 2015	N/A
7	Chris Hadfield	June 1, 2015	N/A
8	Biz Stone	June 8, 2015	N/A
9	Charles Bolden	June 15, 2015	N/A
10	Norman Lear	June 22, 2015	N/A

=== Season 2 (2015–16) ===
No.	Guests	Original release date	U.S. viewers (millions)
11	Bill Clinton	October 25, 2015	0.219
12	Larry Wilmore	November 1, 2015	N/A
13	Seth MacFarlane	November 8, 2015	N/A
14	Penn & Teller	November 15, 2015	N/A
15	Susan Sarandon	November 29, 2015	N/A
16	David Byrne	December 6, 2015	N/A
17	Bas Lansdorp (Mars One)	December 13, 2015	0.167
18	David Crosby	December 20, 2015	0.138
19	Brian Cox	December 27, 2015	0.180
20	Gina McCarthy	January 3, 2016	0.156

=== Season 3 (2016–17) ===
No.	Guests	Original release date	U.S. viewers (millions)
21	Whoopi Goldberg	September 19, 2016	N/A
22	Mayim Bialik	September 26, 2016	N/A
23	Philippe Petit	October 3, 2016	N/A
24	Christopher Lloyd and Michelle Gomez	October 10, 2016	N/A
25	Brian Greene	October 17, 2016	0.117
26	Robert Kirkman	October 24, 2016	N/A
27	Jeremy Irons	November 7, 2016	N/A
28	Andy Weir	November 14, 2016	0.241
29	Ben Stiller	November 21, 2016	N/A
30	Buzz Aldrin	November 28, 2016	N/A
31	Terry Crews	December 5, 2016	N/A
32	Jay Leno	December 12, 2016	N/A
33	William Shatner	December 19, 2016	0.186
34	Ash Carter	December 26, 2016	0.209
35	Hope Solo	January 2, 2017	N/A
36	Jill Tarter	January 9, 2017	N/A
37	Kathryn D. Sullivan	January 16, 2017	N/A
38	Isaac Hempstead Wright	January 23, 2017	N/A
39	Herbie Hancock and Wayne Shorter	January 30, 2017	N/A
40	Bill Maher	February 6, 2017	N/A

=== Season 4 (2017–18) ===
No.	Guests	Original release date	U.S. viewers (millions)
41	Lance Armstrong	October 1, 2017	N/A
42	Kareem Abdul-Jabbar	October 8, 2017	N/A
43	Jane Goodall	October 15, 2017	N/A
44	Katie Couric	October 22, 2017	N/A
45	Kevin Smith	October 29, 2017	N/A
46	Arati Prabhakar	November 5, 2017	N/A
47	Katy Perry	November 12, 2017	N/A
48	Sylvia Earle, Fabien Cousteau and Adrian Grenier	November 19, 2017	N/A
49	James Cameron	November 26, 2017	N/A
50	Nainoa Thompson	December 3, 2017	N/A
51	Salman Rushdie	December 10, 2017	N/A
52	Mae Jemison	December 17, 2017	N/A
53	Alan Alda	January 7, 2018	N/A
54	Stephen Colbert	January 14, 2018	N/A
55	Margot Lee Shetterly and Janelle Monáe	January 21, 2018	N/A
56	Sam Harris	January 28, 2018	N/A
57	Frank Oz	February 4, 2018	N/A
58	Kelly Slater	February 18, 2018	N/A
59	Scott Kelly	February 25, 2018	N/A
60	Stephen Hawking	March 4, 2018	N/A

=== Season 5 (2018–19) ===
No.	Guests	Original release date	U.S. viewers (millions)
61	Anthony Bourdain	November 12, 2018	N/A
62	Joe Rogan	November 19, 2018	N/A
63	Simon Helberg and Bill Prady	November 26, 2018	N/A
64	United States Space Command	April 4, 2019	N/A
65	Al Gore	April 4, 2019	N/A
66	Jack Black	April 11, 2019	N/A
67	Dan Rather	April 11, 2019	N/A
68	George R.R. Martin	April 18, 2019	N/A
69	Anna Deavere Smith	April 18, 2019	N/A
70	Jeff Goldblum	April 25, 2019	N/A
71	James Marsden	April 26, 2019	N/A
72	Weird Al Yankovic	May 2, 2019	N/A
73	Patricia Cornwall	May 3, 2019	N/A
74	Darren Aronofsky	May 9, 2019	N/A
75	Bill Nye	May 10, 2019	N/A
76	Christiane Amanpour	May 16, 2019	N/A

== Broadcast ==
In Australia, the series premiered on National Geographic Channel on April 27, 2015.

From November 2018 to March 2019, season 5 was put on hiatus because of ongoing investigations involving the host. At the conclusion of the investigations, the networks began airing new episodes in April 2019.

== In popular culture ==
On August 27, 2015, 20th Century Fox released a viral video advertisement for the movie The Martian, taking the form of a special episode of StarTalk, with Tyson discussing the fictional Ares 3 mission from the film.

== See also ==
- StarTalk (podcast)
- The Sky at Night
- Science communication
