= StarTalk (podcast) =

Podcast hosted by Neil DeGrasse Tyson

StarTalk Radio
- Genre: Popular science, comedy

Cast and voices
- Hosted by: Neil deGrasse Tyson

Music
- Theme music composed by: Roy Harter

Production
- Production: Curved Light Productions

Publication
- No. of seasons: 17 (as of May 2026)
- No. of episodes: 1096 (as of 1 May 2026)
- Original release: June 1, 2009

Related
- Adaptations: StarTalk (American talk show)
- Website: startalkradio.net

StarTalk is a podcast on science, comedy, and popular culture hosted by astrophysicist Neil deGrasse Tyson and comedian Chuck Nice, with various other comic and celebrity co-hosts and frequent guests from the worlds of science and entertainment. Past co-hosts have included Colin Jost, Lynne Koplitz, Leighann Lord, Eugene Mirman, John Oliver, and Kristen Schaal. Guests have included astronaut Buzz Aldrin, actor Morgan Freeman, George Takei, comedian Joan Rivers, Arianna Huffington, YouTuber Sam Denby, Richard Dawkins and writer Mary Roach. StarTalk has a segment called Cosmic Queries, in which listeners send in questions about the universe to be answered on the show.

In May 2014, Rolling Stone ranked StarTalk at number 13 on its list of "The 20 Best Comedy Podcasts Right Now".

On February 29, 2016, it was announced that there would be a spinoff podcast, StarTalk All-Stars, whose rotating hosts will be former StarTalk guests. In addition, the regular StarTalk comedy co-hosts will appear.

Starting on February 1, 2017, a second spinoff, Playing with Science, was launched to discuss the science of sports. It is hosted by Gary O'Reilly and frequent StarTalk co-host Chuck Nice.

StarTalk is partially funded by a grant from the National Science Foundation.

As a homage to Jack Horkheimer, an astronomer who hosted the weekly television show Star Gazers on PBS, Tyson frequently ends his podcast with Horkheimer's trademark sign-off "Keep looking up!".

== Television series ==
In January 2015, the Washington Post reported that a late-night talk show called Star Talk, hosted by Tyson, would air on the National Geographic Channel starting in April 2015. On July 29, 2015, it was announced that the show was renewed for a second season.

As of February 4, 2016, audio recordings of all twenty TV episodes have subsequently aired as podcast episodes.

== See also ==
- Science communication
