= President's Commission on Excellence in Special Education =

The President's Commission on Excellence in Special Education was a Presidential Commission formed by United States President George W. Bush on October 2, 2001, through the Executive Order 13227 and amended on February 6, 2002, through Executive Order 13255.

The commission issued its final report on July 1, 2002.
