= Sheila Rodwell =

British nutritional epidemiologist

Sheila Rodwell OBE FMedSci
- Born: Sheila Harrison; 7 March 1947; St Albans, England
- Died: 16 June 2009 (aged 62); Cambridge, England
- Other name: Sheila Bingham
- Education: Queen Elizabeth College, University of London
- Occupation: nutritional epidemiologist
- Known for: research in diet and disease
- Spouses: Roger Bingham (m. 1970, divorced) Simon Rodwell (m. 2000)

Sheila Rodwell OBE (née Harrison; March 7, 1947 – June 16, 2009), known professionally by her first married name Sheila Bingham, was a British nutritional epidemiologist known for conducting detailed studies into clarify the biological mechanisms underlying the effects of different diets on health and disease, especially cancer.

== Education ==
Bingham was educated at Loughborough High School and graduated from Queen Elizabeth College with a BSc in Nutrition in 1968, and 1969 with a Postgraduate Diploma in Dietetics as dietitian. In 1984, she was awarded her PhD from the University of London for her work on the development of biomarkers of nutritional intake.

== Career ==
After having worked as a hospital dietitian, Bingham became a research officer at the MRC Dunn Human Nutrition Unit. She was one of the founding investigators of the European Prospective Investigation into Cancer and Nutrition and the EPIC Norfolk cohort in and around Norwich. She became deputy director of the MRC Dunn Human Nutrition Unit in 1997 and leader of the "Diet and Cancer" group. In 2006, she became director of the new MRC Centre for Nutritional Epidemiology in Cancer Prevention and Survival at the University of Cambridge. She was honorary professor of Nutritional Epidemiology at the University of Cambridge and lifelong fellow at Clare Hall.

She was elected a Fellow of the Academy of Medical Sciences in 2001 and appointed an Officer of the Order of the British Empire in 2009.

== Research ==
Bingham's research concerned the association between diet and disease, and in particular objective methods for the objective assessment of dietary exposure.

== Personal life ==
Bingham married Roger Bingham in 1970; in 2000 she married Simon Rodwell.
