= Welcome to the Universe =

Book by Neil deGrasse Tyson

Welcome to the Universe: An Astrophysical Tour
- Author: Neil deGrasse Tyson; Michael A. Strauss; J. Richard Gott
- Language: English
- Subject: Astrophysics
- Genre: Non-fiction
- Publisher: Princeton University Press
- Publication date: September 20, 2016
- Publication place: United States
- Media type: Print (Hardcover)
- Pages: 472
- ISBN: 0691157243
- Preceded by: Space Chronicles
- Followed by: Astrophysics for People in a Hurry

Welcome to the Universe: An Astrophysical Tour is a popular science book by Neil deGrasse Tyson, Michael A. Strauss, and J. Richard Gott, based on an introductory astrophysics course they co-taught at Princeton University. The book was published by the Princeton University Press on September 20, 2016.

== Reception ==
Welcome to the Universe: An Astrophysical Tour has been praised by literary critics. Kirkus Reviews described the book as "an accessible and comprehensive overview of our universe by three eminent astrophysicists" and "an entertaining introduction to astronomy." John Timpane of The Philadelphia Inquirer similarly called it "a well-illustrated tour that includes Pluto, questions of intelligent life, and whether the universe is infinite." Publishers Weekly wrote:

Reading through is akin to receiving a private museum tour from an expert scientist; the exhibits include Newton's laws of motion, what will happen after our sun dies, how the space between stars is measured, quasars and black holes, time travel, why the "Big Bang model is far more than 'just a theory,' " and the possibility of other life in the galaxy. The authors present challenging content in accessible prose as they lead readers from our solar system to the edge of the visible universe, getting into the how and the what of just about everything there is to know about the cosmos.
