= Space Chronicles =

2012 book by Neil deGrasse Tyson

Space Chronicles: Facing the Ultimate Frontier
- Hardcover edition
- Author: Neil deGrasse Tyson
- Language: English
- Subject: Astrophysics
- Genre: Non-fiction
- Publisher: W.W. Norton
- Publication date: 2012
- Publication place: United States
- Media type: Print (Hardcover)
- Pages: 384 pp.
- ISBN: 9780393350371
- Preceded by: The Pluto Files
- Followed by: Welcome to the Universe

Space Chronicles: Facing the Ultimate Frontier is the 2012 anthology by Neil deGrasse Tyson covering his various writings relating to the history and future of NASA and space travel in general.

One of the chapters is a transcript of his attendance as a guest on the Rationally Speaking podcast in 2010, when he explained his justification for spending large amounts of government money on space programs.

Tyson intended the book's original title to be, Failure to Launch: The Dreams and Delusions of Space Enthusiasts.
