= Accessory to War =

2018 science book by Neil deGrasse Tyson and Avis Lang

Accessory to War: The Unspoken Alliance Between Astrophysics and the Military
- Author: Neil deGrasse Tyson, Avis Lang
- Language: English
- Subject: Astrophysics
- Genre: Non-fiction
- Publisher: W. W. Norton & Company
- Publication date: September 11, 2018
- Publication place: United States
- Media type: Print (hardcover)
- ISBN: 978-0-393-06444-5
- OCLC: 1049572472
- Preceded by: Astrophysics for People in a Hurry

Accessory to War: The Unspoken Alliance Between Astrophysics and the Military is the fifteenth book by American astrophysicist and science communicator Neil deGrasse Tyson, which he co-wrote with researcher and writer Avis Lang. It was released on September 11, 2018 by W. W. Norton & Company.

The book chronicles war and the use of space as a weapon going as far back as before the Ancient Greeks, and includes examples such as Christopher Columbus' use of his knowledge of a lunar eclipse and the use of satellite intelligence by the United States during the Gulf War. Tyson told National Geographic that he regards the collaboration between science and the military as a "two-way street."

Marcelo Gleiser wrote that the book "rings like a wake-up call, even if an uncomfortable one."
