= R. Michael Rich =

American astrophysicist

- Born: 1957 (age 67–68); Los Angeles, California, U.S.
- Education: Pomona College (BA); California Institute of Technology (PhD)
- Spouse: Susan Rich
- Children: 2
- Awards: Dudley Observatory Career Development Award (1988); Alfred P. Sloan Fellow (1991-1993); NASA Group Achievement Award (2004)
- Scientific career
- Fields: Astrophysics
- Institutions: Carnegie Institution; Columbia University; University of California, Los Angeles
- Thesis: Abundance and kinematics of K giants in the Galactic nuclear bulge (1986)
- Doctoral advisor: Jeremy R. Mould
- Doctoral students: Neil deGrasse Tyson

Robert Michael Rich (born 1957) is an American astrophysicist. He obtained his B.A. at Pomona College in 1979 and earned his Ph.D. from the California Institute of Technology in 1986 under thesis supervisor Jeremy Mould. He was a Carnegie Fellow at Carnegie/DTM until 1988, when he became an assistant professor of astronomy at Columbia University; during this period, he was the doctoral advisor to Neil deGrasse Tyson. After two years (1996-1998) as a senior research scientist at Columbia, he joined the University of California, Los Angeles as a research astronomer in 1998. As of 2024, he remains affiliated with UCLA as a researcher emeritus/adjunct professor emeritus of astronomy and astrophysics.

Rich is known for his work on the Galactic bulge, including the first measurement of the distribution of stellar abundances and the first map of the bulge stellar kinematics. He also led the team (HST-GO-9099) that discovered the first, and as yet the only confirmed, intermediate mass black hole in the Globular cluster, G1 in M31. Rich has over 450 refereed publications, including 10 articles in the journal Nature and over 100 invited talks at international science meetings. Rich was a member of the Galex science team and is a member of the COSMOS survey team and the LSST project (Milky Way and Local Volume Collaboration). Rich is also a member of the executive committee of the UCLA Faculty Center Board of Governors, and the American Astronomical Society and International Astronomical Union.

== Galactic bulge ==
Rich pioneered the modern study of the central bulge/bar stellar population of the Milky Way galaxy, obtaining the first spectroscopy and metal abundances for stars in the Galactic bulge, showing an average metal content similar to that of the Sun and an abundance distribution following the "simple" closed box model of chemical evolution; this required the central bulge of the Milky Way to form early and rapidly. In collaboration with Andrew McWilliam, Rich found that light or "alpha capture" elements are enhanced in the bulge, consistent with the bulge having formed and built its metals in less than 1 billion years; in collaboration with Andrew McWilliam and Jon Fulbright he used the Keck telescope to obtain high precision abundances of many elements in the bulge, confirming the evidence for early, rapid formation. No large-scale survey had ever been undertaken to study the stellar kinematics of the Galactic bulge before the Bulge Radial Velocity Assay (BRAVA; 31), showing that the stellar kinematics of the bulge is dominated in mass by a bar structure that is proposed to have formed from the buckling of a primordial disk.

In collaboration with Livia Origlia from 2002 to 2018, Rich used the NIRSpec infrared spectrograph on Keck II to obtain high resolution spectra of stars in the Galactic bulge and its globular clusters in a series of 30 papers, overcoming the generally high interstellar extinction in that direction. This work also showed that the globular cluster-like stellar system Terzan 5 has a complex internal spread in iron abundance and chemistry. The ultimate spectral resolution selected for the APOGEE survey matched that of these early studies. Rich also led teams working on infrared spectroscopy of the Galactic bulge and the nuclear star cluster, finding roughly normal Solar scaled abundances for red giants with 4 pc of the Milky Way's supermassive black hole, Sgr A* and disproving claims of extraordinary abundances of Sc, V, and Y in red giants near Sgr A*

== Stellar populations ==
M31 cluster Mayall II

Rich obtained the first Hubble Space Telescope image and color-magnitude diagram for the massive M31 globular cluster G1=Mayall II discovered the first case of an extreme blue horizontal branch population in metal rich globular clusters (NGC 6388 and 6441). Rich also discovered the first known case of a luminous red novae variable, the star RV in the bulge of M31.

== Selected awards and recognition ==
Rich received a Dudley Observatory Career Development Award (1988), was an Alfred P. Sloan Fellow from 1991 to 1993, and received the NASA Group Achievement Award (2004) for his work on the science team (2003-2013) of the Galaxy Evolution Explorer Satellite. In 2012, Rich was recognized with a Certificate of Appreciation from the LA Conservancy, for saving the UCLA Faculty Center building.

Rich was also a member of the ad hoc science working group for the Next Generation Space Telescope, which became the James Webb Space Telescope. Rich contributed a Review chapter on the Galactic Bulge for Stars, Planets, and Stellar Systems. Volume 5

== Noteworthy Ph.D. students ==
Neil deGrasse Tyson (Ph.D)
HongSheng Zhao (Ph.D); Faculty University of St. Andrews
Edgar O. Smith (Ph.D); Chair of Princeton Astrophysics Visiting Committee, and builder of Calypso telescope that is now the spectroscopic monitor telescope of LSST
Christian D. Howard (Ph.D)

== Historic preservation ==
In 2010, UCLA announced its plans to demolish the UCLA Faculty Center and to replace it with a conference center and hotel. Rich was one of the principle organizers of the Ad hoc Committee to save the faculty center, rallying faculty and community opinion to preserve the 1959 mid-Century structure that was inspired by Edward Fickett with Austin, Field, and Fry as the supervising architects. Rich assisted in the discovery and identification of an important 10 foot long wooden carved wall by Panelcarve, designed noted mid-century artists Jerome and Evelyn Ackerman. The conference center was built elsewhere on campus and the Faculty Center will undergo renovation.

Rich also opposed the sale of the Hannah Carter Japanese Garden as well as the removal of artifacts, which had been gifted in perpetuity to UCLA by the spouse of Edward Carter, who was the chair of UC Regents.
