= The Pluto Files =

Book by Neil deGrasse Tyson

- Author: Neil deGrasse Tyson
- Language: English
- Subject: Astronomy, Pluto
- Publisher: W. W. Norton & Company
- Publication date: January 26, 2009
- Pages: 224
- ISBN: 978-0-393-35036-4
- OCLC: 154706867
- Dewey Decimal: 523.49/22 22
- LC Class: QB701 .T97 2009
- Preceded by: Death by Black Hole
- Followed by: Space Chronicles: Facing the Ultimate Frontier

The Pluto Files: The Rise and Fall of America's Favorite Planet is a book written by the astrophysicist and Hayden Planetarium director Neil deGrasse Tyson. The book is about Pluto, which was demoted to the status of dwarf planet in August 2006 by the International Astronomical Union, thereby depriving it of its planet-hood. The book also focuses on the fact that many Americans rallied their support for this icy dwarf on the edge of the Solar System because it was discovered by an American.

The book was given a good review by Jon Stewart in a guest segment with Tyson on The Daily Show. During the interview, Stewart humorously lauded the book as "the most exciting book about Pluto you will ever read in your life," as well as "the compelling story of how [Tyson] destroyed Pluto's life."

The book explains in full detail the journey of Pluto's life from its days as Planet X, to its discovery in the early 20th century and all the way to its current title as a Trans-Neptunian object.

The book appeared on the extended hardcover nonfiction bestseller list in The New York Times in February 2009.
