= President's Commission on Financial Structure and Regulation =

United States Presidential Commission

The President's Commission on Financial Structure and Regulation, also known as the Hunt Commission (and not to be confused with the Hunt Commission of 1981) was a United States Presidential Commission created by President Richard Nixon between April and June 1970 that was "[r]esponsible for recommending measures to improve operation of the nation's private financial system."

Chaired by corporate executive Reed Oliver Hunt, it was appointed as a response to disintermediation in the previous year which developed due in part to interest rate caps (Regulation Q) on interest paid on deposits in banks and savings institutions. By limiting deposit interest, Regulation Q prevented banks from competing with rising money market funds (MMF's) that were relatively unregulated and thus able to provide higher returns by investing client funds directly in unsecured commercial paper and repurchase agreements. On December 22, 1971, the Commission's Report of the President's Commission on Financial Structure and Regulation was released, the Commission "laid out an agenda for reform and deregulation" which influenced legislative proposals by Presidents Nixon, Ford, and Carter, the latter of whom presided over the substantial realization of the Commission's recommendations in 1980 with the Depository Institutions Deregulation and Monetary Control Act, which "removed most distinctions between commercial banks and thrifts, allowed NOW accounts nationwide, and initiated a phased end to interest rate ceilings."

The Commission heralded the general trend toward deregulation that predominated economic policy for nearly four decades between 1970 and 2008, when the 2008 financial crisis revealed the weaknesses of the financial system. Regulation was visibly embraced with the passage of the Dodd–Frank Wall Street Reform and Consumer Protection Act in 2010.

== See also ==
- List of Presidential Commissions
