= Death by Black Hole =

Book by Neil deGrasse Tyson

Death by Black Hole : And Other Cosmic Quandaries
- Author: Neil deGrasse Tyson
- Subject: Astrophysics
- Publisher: W. W. Norton & Company
- Publication date: 2007
- Publication place: United States
- Media type: Print (Hardcover)
- Pages: 384
- ISBN: 978-0393062243
- LC Class: QB982 .T965 2007
- Preceded by: Origins: Fourteen Billion Years of Cosmic Evolution
- Followed by: The Pluto Files

Death by Black Hole: And Other Cosmic Quandaries is a 2007 popular science book written by Neil deGrasse Tyson. It is an anthology of several of Tyson's most popular articles, all published in Natural History magazine between 1995 and 2005, and was featured in an episode of The Daily Show with Jon Stewart.

== Summary ==
Death by Black Hole is divided into seven sections: The Nature of Knowledge, The Knowledge of Nature, Ways and Means of Nature, The Meaning of Life, When the Universe Turns Bad, Science and Culture, and Science and God.

Section 1 comprises five chapters:

- Chapter 1, "Coming to Our Senses", discusses how important the augmentation of our five basic senses (sight, hearing, taste, smell, touch) is for expanding scientific knowledge. Tools that convert (seemingly) latent aspects of our environment into quantities we can sense greatly ease scientific discovery. For example, night vision goggles convert the near-infrared spectrum into the visible spectrum, making it easier for biologists to observe nocturnal animal behavior.
- Chapter 2, "On Earth as in the Heavens", addresses the history of physics and how it came to be known that physical laws observed on Earth are also observed on the sun and the other planets. In short, how physics became a study of the universal rather than just the terrestrial.
- Chapter 3, "Seeing Isn't Believing", hints at the pitfalls of generalizing from too little evidence. It begins by making the point that although we know the Earth is round, it appears flat when one observes only a small, local portion of it.
- Chapter 4, "The Information Trap", observes that we can view our surroundings at many different scales, and may find different phenomena at different scales. For instance, on a macroscopic scale classical mechanics describes the physical behaviors we observe, while on a smaller scale, quantum mechanics comes into play.
- Chapter 5, "Stick-in-the-Mud Science", guides the reader through a series of experiments based primarily on watching how the shadow of a stick, stuck upright in the earth, changes as time passes. For example, one can observe that, in the northern hemisphere, over the course of a day, the shadow of the stick will trace out a semi-circle as it moves clockwise.
