= Astrophysics for People in a Hurry =

2017 book by Neil deGrasse Tyson

- Author: Neil deGrasse Tyson
- Language: English
- Subject: Astrophysics
- Genre: Non-fiction
- Publisher: W. W. Norton & Company
- Publication date: May 2, 2017
- Publication place: United States
- Media type: Print (Hardcover)
- Pages: 244
- ISBN: 978-0-393-60939-4
- Preceded by: Welcome to the Universe
- Followed by: Accessory to War

Astrophysics for People in a Hurry is a 2017 popular science book by Neil deGrasse Tyson, centering around a number of basic questions about the universe. Published on May 2, 2017, by W. W. Norton & Company, the book is a collection of Tyson's essays that appeared in Natural History magazine at various times from 1997 to 2007.

== Contents ==
Neil deGrasse Tyson's Astrophysics for People in a Hurry is a popular introduction to the main concepts and issues of modern astrophysics. The author explains the origin and structure of the Universe, the force of gravity, light, dark matter and dark energy, about our place in the Cosmos and how we try to understand its laws. The book is written in a simple and lively language, using vivid analogies. It is intended for a wide range of readers who want to get a general idea of astrophysics without complex formulas and details. The book consists of 12 short chapters, based on essays published in Natural History magazine.

== Sales ==
The book debuted at #1 on The New York Times Non-Fiction Best Seller list when it first appeared in May, 2017. It sold 48,416 copies in its first week, making it the second-most-purchased overall in the U.S. for that week (behind the children's fiction novel The Dark Prophecy). A year later, it remained in the top five and had sold in excess of one million copies.

== Reception ==
In Kirkus Reviews, the reviewer praised Tyson's "down-to-earth wit" and stated that the book "shows once again [Tyson's] masterly skills at explaining complex scientific concepts in a lucid, readable fashion."

The book's accessible language is noted in a review in BBC Sky at Night magazine. The reviewer suggests that the reader who spends their time on Tyson's work, will have a good understanding of "every part of our known Universe, how it came to be and what still keeps physicists up at night".

Tyson was nominated for the Grammy Award for Best Spoken Word Album.
