= President's Commission on Implementation of United States Space Exploration Policy =

Presidential Commission formed by US President George W. Bush

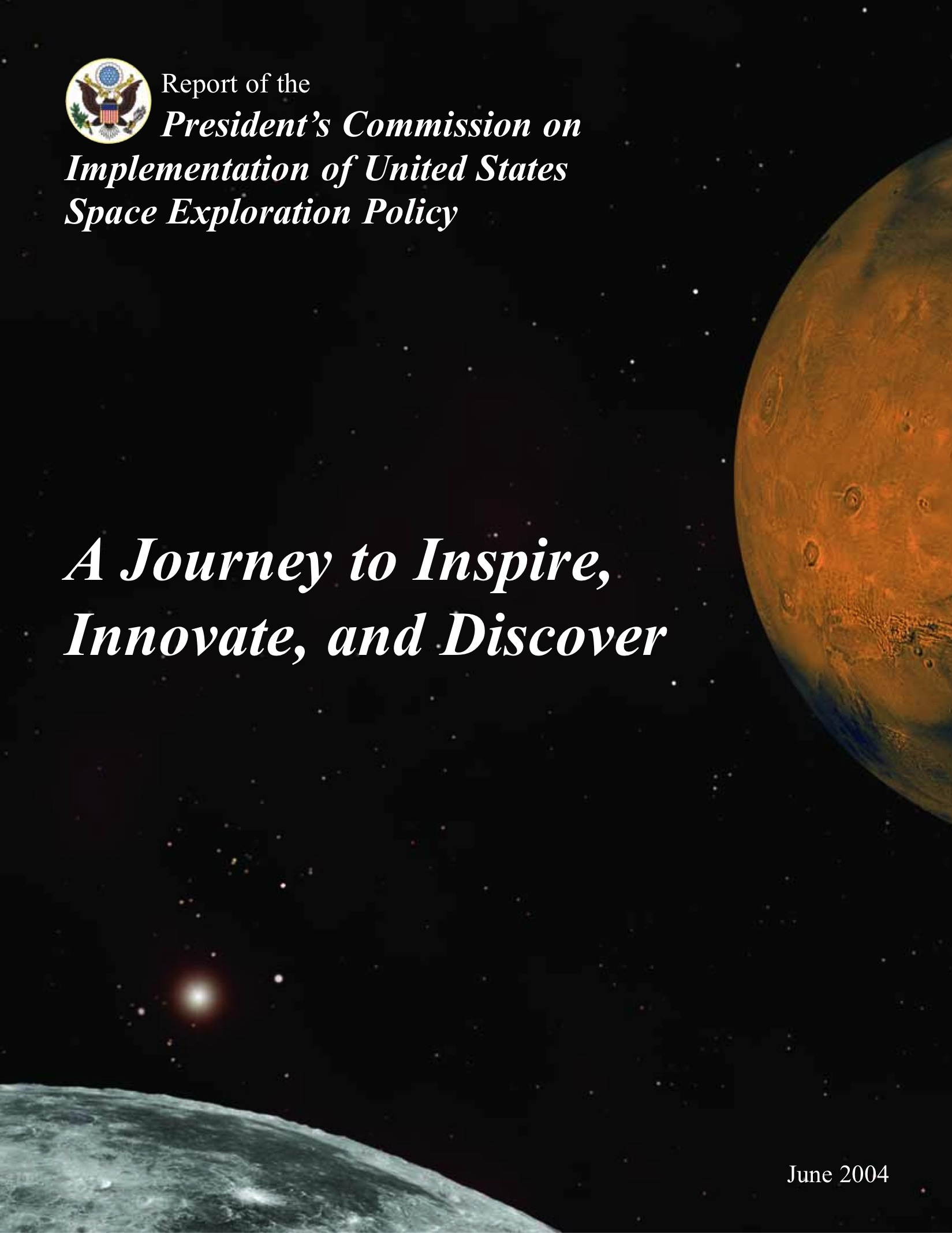
Cover page of final report

The President's Commission on Implementation of United States Space Exploration Policy was a Presidential Commission formed by United States President George W. Bush on January 27, 2004, through the Executive Order 13326. Its final report was submitted on June 4, 2004.

== Commissioners ==
There were nine members of the commission:

- Edward C. Aldridge Jr. - Chairman
- Carly Fiorina
- Michael P. Jackson
- Laurie Leshin
- Lester L. Lyles
- Paul D. Spudis
- Neil deGrasse Tyson
- Robert S. Walker
- Maria T. Zuber

== Hearings ==
There were five public hearings held by the commission to gain a variety of different perspectives. They were as follows:

- February 11, 2004 - National Transportation Safety Board, Washington, D.C.
- March 3–4, 2004 - United States Air Force Museum, Wright-Patterson Air Force Base, Ohio
- March 24–25, 2004 - Georgia Tech, Atlanta, Georgia
- April 15–17, 2004 - Galileo Academy of Science and Technology, San Francisco, California
- May 3–4, 2004 - Asia Society, New York City

== Findings ==
The committee's findings and recommendations were:*

- Space exploration must be a national priority
- NASA's relationship to the private sector must be transformed
- Key technologies must be developed
- A robust space industry is required
- International resources are valuable
- A space program can stimulate math, science, and engineering education

== See also ==
- Commission on the Future of the United States Aerospace Industry
- U.S. National Space Policy
