= Beyond Belief: Science, Religion, Reason and Survival =

2006 scientific conference on religion

Banner for the symposium, Blake's Ancient of Days

Beyond Belief: Science, Religion, Reason and Survival was the first gathering of The Science Network's annual Beyond Belief symposia, held from November 5–7, 2006, at the Salk Institute for Biological Studies in La Jolla, California.

It was described by The New York Times, as "a free-for-all on science and religion", which seemed at times like "the founding convention for a political party built on a single plank: in a world dangerously charged with ideology, science needs to take on an evangelical role, vying with religion as teller of the greatest story ever told."

== Conference goals and topics ==
The event was conceived to challenge the efforts of the Templeton Foundation to reconcile science with religion, according to its underwriter Robert Zeps, who told an interviewer:

I am not anti-Templeton in the sense of funding scientists to say mean things about religion. I simply believe that all study should be free of any particular agenda besides learning... Most take the position that the religious right are just nuts who are loud but frankly undeserving of a response... I believe that Bill Gates and Steve Jobs and pretty much all of the tech age wealth is firmly on the side of science and they need to step up and say so in a way that is heard by the anti-science lobby.

Many conference participants leveled strong criticism at the activities of the Templeton Foundation, charging that it attempted to blur the line between science and religion, and that it funded "garbage research" aimed at showing a healing effect of prayer. The Templeton Foundation has funded numerous conferences intended to "smooth over the differences between science and religion" and portray them as metaphysically equivalent.

New Scientist summed up the topics to be discussed as a list of three questions:

- Can science help us create a new rational narrative as poetic and powerful as those that have traditionally sustained societies?
- Can we treat religion as a natural phenomenon?
- Can we be good without God? And if not God, then what?

The conference devoted its final session to "the negative effects of introducing religion into medicine".

== Speakers ==
- Steven Weinberg
- Lawrence Krauss
- Carolyn Porco
- Richard Dawkins
- Peter Atkins
- Sam Harris
- Michael Shermer
- Peter Turchin
- Neil deGrasse Tyson
- Terrence Sejnowski
- Joan Roughgarden
- Sean M. Carroll
- David Sloan Wilson
- John Allen Paulos
- David Brin
- David Albert
- Leon Lederman
- Roger Bingham
- Francisco Ayala
- Stuart Hameroff
- Vilayanur S. Ramachandran
- Paul Davies
- Jonathan Haidt
- Steven Nadler
- Patricia Churchland
- Susan Neiman
- George Koob
- Daniel Dennett
- Stuart Kauffman
- Loyal Rue
- Elizabeth Loftus
- Mahzarin Banaji
- Scott Atran
- Harold Kroto
- Charles L. Harper Jr., John Templeton Foundation
- Ann Druyan
- James Woodward, University of Pittsburgh
- Melvin Konner
- Philip Zimbardo
- Paul Churchland
- Richard P. Sloan, Columbia University Medical Center
- Tony Haymet

== Perspectives from participants ==
Most participants were critical of religion and its effects upon public opinion, scientific inquiry, and policy. Steven Weinberg said, "the world needs to wake up from its long nightmare of religious belief." Sam Harris stated that science was about "intellectual honesty". Richard Dawkins expressed more forceful views, calling religion "brainwashing" and "child abuse".

Lawrence Krauss argued that science could not necessarily disprove the existence of god; Francisco Ayala argued that people need "meaning and purpose and life".

Emory anthropologist Melvin Konner condemned what he saw as overly simplistic representations of religion by Dawkins and others present. He said that the event came to resemble a "den of vipers" debating "[whether to] bash religion with a crowbar or only with a baseball bat?"

== Perspective from the Templeton Foundation ==
A Templeton spokesperson responded by warning against "commercialized ideological scientism", the effort to profit from promoting science as the only guide to truth.
