= Deep history =

Academic discipline that studies humanity's origins

Deep history is a term for the study of the distant past of the human species. As an intellectual discipline, deep history encourages scholars in anthropology, archaeology, primatology, genetics and linguistics to work together to write a common narrative about the beginnings of humans, and to redress what they see as an imbalance among historians, who mostly concentrate on more recent periods. Deep history forms part of Big History, and looks at the portion of deep time when humans existed, going further back than prehistory, mainly based on archaeology and using a wider range of approaches.

Proponents of deep history argue for a definition of history that rests not upon the invention of writing, but upon the evolution of anatomically modern humans. According to Daniel Lord Smail, perhaps the most prominent advocate of deep history, the concept of prehistory is recast as an arbitrary boundary that limits the longue durée perspective of historians, and which rests upon assumptions that history follows a teleological path beginning with the origins of civilization in Ancient Mesopotamia. For example, Smail suggests that advances in disciplines such as neurobiology, neurophysiology and genetics mean that there are more possibilities for understanding the distant past, and offer opportunities to explain how events such as biological evolution, global environmental change, and patterns of the spread of disease have affected humanity today. Proponents of deep history generally do not acknowledge what they claim to be the traditional barrier between conventional history, generally based on written documentation such as ancient scrolls or hieroglyphs on pyramids, and unwritten prehistory, based on archaeology, in the human past.

A review of Smail's book by Steven Mithen, professor of Archaeology at the University of Reading, is sympathetic to some parts of his thesis, but says "Smail may not be as closely acquainted with the ongoing debates in prehistoric archaeology as he might be", and on Smail's critical description of historians: "I have to take Smail’s word for it that such historians still exist, as after more than a century of prehistoric archaeology they would be an astonishing throwback to another age".

== See also ==
- Hierarchy theory
- Scale (analytical tool)
- James Hutton
