= The Science Network =

Organization

- Founded: 2004
- Founders: Roger Bingham and Terrence Sejnowski
- Legal status: Defunct domain as of February 2026
- Location: San Diego, CA, United States
- Region served: Global
- Method: Video sharing
- Official language: English
- Key people: Roger Bingham, co-founder and director Terrence Sejnowski, advisory board chair
- Website: http://thesciencenetwork.org

The Science Network (TSN) was a non-profit virtual forum dedicated to science and its impact on society. It was initially conceived in 2003 by Roger Bingham and Terry Sejnowski as a cable science TV network modeled on C-SPAN. TSN later became a global digital platform hosting videos of lectures from scientific meetings and long form one-on-one conversations with prominent scientists and communicators of science, including Neil deGrasse Tyson, V.S. Ramachandran, Helen S. Mayberg, and Barbara Landau. TSN has also sponsored and co-sponsored scientific forums, such as Stem cells: science, ethics and politics at the crossroads, held at the Salk Institute in 2004 and the Beyond Belief conference series.

== Beyond Belief conference series ==
TSN's signature series Beyond Belief was conceived to bring together a community of scientists, philosophers, scholars from the humanities, and social commentators. Speakers at these meetings have included Steven Weinberg, Richard Dawkins, Sam Harris, Harry Kroto, Neil deGrasse Tyson, and Stuart Kauffman. So far, the following three Beyond Belief conferences were organized:

=== 2006: Science, Religion, Reason and Survival ===
Beyond Belief: Science, Religion, Reason and Survival, the first of The Science Network's annual Beyond Belief symposia, held from November 5 to November 7, 2006, was described by The New York Times, as "a free-for-all on science and religion," which seemed at times like "the founding convention for a political party built on a single plank: in a world dangerously charged with ideology, science needs to take on an evangelical role, vying with religion as teller of the greatest story ever told." According to participant Melvin Konner, however, the event came to resemble a "den of vipers” debating the issue, "Should we bash religion with a crowbar or only with a baseball bat?”

New Scientist summed up the topics to be discussed as a list of three questions:

- Can science help us create a new rational narrative as poetic and powerful as those that have traditionally sustained societies?
- Can we treat religion as a natural phenomenon?
- Can we be good without God? And if not God, then what?

Speakers included physicists Steven Weinberg, Lawrence Krauss, Philosopher/author Sam Harris, biologist Joan Roughgarden, Michael Shermer of Skeptic Magazine, anthropologist Scott Atran and astrophysicist Neil deGrasse Tyson.

=== 2007: Enlightenment 2.0 ===
Beyond Belief: Enlightenment 2.0 was the second annual symposium and was held from 31 October to 2 November 2007 at the Frederic de Hoffmann Auditorium of the Salk Institute for Biological Studies.

The conference was released on a five-disc DVD series in 2007.

Credited participants
Disc 1	Disc 2	Disc 3	Disc 4	Disc 5
Darrin McMahon; Margaret Jacob; Edward Slingerland; Donald Rutherford; Daniel Dennett; David Sloan Wilson; Jonathan Haidt	Michael Shermer; panel discussion; Gregory Clark; Deirdre McCloskey; Stuart Kauffman; Sean Carrol; David Albert	Peter Atkins; Harold Kroto; Scott Atran; Lee Silver; Greg Epstein; Ronald de Sousa; Patricia Churchland	Rebecca Goldstein; John Allen Paulos; V.S. Ramachandran; Adam Kolber; Jonathan Gottschall; David Brin; Robert Winter	Sam Harris; Daniel Smail; Jeff Hawkins; PZ Myers; Harold Kroto; Roger Bingham

=== 2008: Candles in the Dark ===
Beyond Belief: Candles in the Dark was the third annual Beyond Belief symposium. This event was organized by The Science Network and held from 3 October to 6 October 2008 in San Diego, CA.
