= Commission on the Future of the United States Aerospace Industry =

U.S. government commission

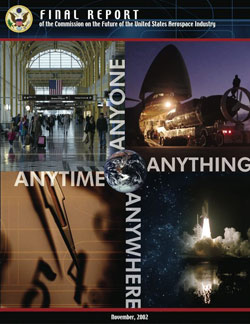
Cover page of final report

The Commission on the Future of the United States Aerospace Industry (CFUSAI) was formed jointly by United States President George W. Bush and the United States Congress in 2001. Its first public meeting was held on November 27, 2001, and its final report was given on November 18, 2002.

== Introduction ==
An excerpt from the introduction of the Interim Report #2 of the commission:

The Commission on the Future of the United States Aerospace Industry was established by Section 1092 of the Floyd D. Spence National Defense Authorization Act for fiscal year 2001, Public Law 106-398. It was formed to study the future of the U.S. aerospace industry in the global economy, particularly in relationship to U.S. national security; and to assess the future importance of the domestic aerospace industry for the economic and national security of the United States.

== Commissioners ==
The Commission consisted of 12 members, six of whom were appointed by the President, and six appointed by Congress (three from the House and three from the Senate).

=== Presidential appointees ===
- Buzz Aldrin - former astronaut
- Ed Bolen - President of General Aviation Manufacturers Association
- John W. Douglass - former Assistant Secretary of the Navy
- Neil deGrasse Tyson - astrophysicist
- Robert Smith Walker - former U.S. Representative from Pennsylvania
- Heidi Wood - Managing Director, Morgan Stanley
- Executive Director - Charles H. Huettner

=== Senate appointees ===
- John Hamre
- William Schneider, Jr.
- Robert J. Stevens - Chairman, President, and CEO of Lockheed Martin

=== House appointees ===
- Tom Buffenbarger - President of the International Association of Machinists
- F. Whitten Peters
- Tillie K. Fowler

== Reports ==
The commission produced three interim reports and a final report.

- Interim report #1 - December 18, 2001
- Interim report #2 - March 20, 2002
- Interim report #3 - June 26, 2002
- Final report - November 18, 2002

== Meetings ==
The commission held six public meetings to hear testimonies and gain different perspectives. The first meeting was held on November 27, 2001, where the commission heard testimonies from the Administration, Congress, and the Executive Branch. The second meeting was held on February 12, 2002, which consisted of Air Transportation Capacity / Infrastructure discussions, and well as Export Control discussions. The third meeting was held on May 14, 2002, and included discussions on Space, including a testimony from Sean O'Keefe.

The three other public meetings were held on August 22, 2002, September 17, 2002, and October 23, 2002.

== See also ==
- President's Commission on Implementation of United States Space Exploration Policy
