= Leighann Lord =

American comedian, writer and actress

- Leighann Lord at DragonCon in 2026
- Born: South Jamaica, Queens, New York City
- Education: B.A. Baruch College
- Occupations: Comedian, writer, actress
- Known for: Star Talk Radio

Leighann Lord is an American comedian, writer, and actress. She performs stand-up comedy, has appeared on Tough Crowd with Colin Quinn, and is a former co-host (with Neil deGrasse Tyson) of the Star Talk Radio podcast. Lord is a co-host for Center for Inquiry's Point of Inquiry podcast and the host of Skeptical Inquirer Presents. She is a fellow with the Committee for Skeptical Inquiry.

== Early life and education ==
Leighann Lord was born in the South Jamaica neighborhood of Queens in New York City, and was raised by her West Indian parents. She attributes her interest in comedy to both her cultural heritage and to looking for a way to avoid being teased as a child. She reports "People started to laugh with me and not at me. I was an 11-year-old sixth-grader with a game plan that led me in the right direction." She attended Baruch College at the City University of New York where she studied journalism, creative writing and theater with an interest in show business; in 1989, she graduated magna cum laude with a BA in journalism and creative writing.

== Career ==
After college, Lord worked for five years in corporate communications for Chemical Bank, but retained an interest in show business, and eventually started performing at stand-up comedy clubs.

She has performed stand-up on Lifetime's "Girls Night Out," HBO's "Def Comedy Jam" and Comedy Central's "Premium Blend", and she won the "Hilarious Housewives Contest" on ABC's "The View." She cites as comedic influences including George Carlin, Marsha Warfield, Carol Burnett and Bertice Berry.

In addition to performing her own material, Lord was a writer for The Chris Rock Show and writes the syndicated humor column "The Urban Erma".

In February 2015, Lord featured on Star Talk Radio with Neil deGrasse Tyson in the episode "From Warp Drives to Cloaking Devices: Star Trek Cosmic Queries Sunday".

Lord is associated with African Americans for Humanism, which ran a 2012 media campaign including billboards depicting Lord and other contemporary activists and organizers alongside historically prominent African American humanists Zora Neale Hurston, Langston Hughes, and Frederick Douglass. The American Humanist Association awarded her the Humanist Arts Award in 2019.

Lord was the emcee at the 2019 skeptical convention, CSICon, in Las Vegas, Nevada. She used her "light touch" to ask "provocative questions like 'What if Adam was made from Eve's rib?'"

In 2021 she did a special for Dry Bar Comedy Leighann Lord: I Mean Business, and she appeared on Showtime's 'Even More Funny Women of a Certain Age'

As of 2022, Lord is a fellow with the Committee for Skeptical Inquiry, and currently co-hosts the Center for Inquiry's Skeptical Inquirer Presents web series.

She was the Gala host at the American Banker's Most Powerful Woman in Banking held in New York City on October 5th 2023.

Lord presented “And Now for Something Completely Different: Enlightening and Entertaining”, a stand-up comedy routine at CSICon 2023

== Books ==
- Leighann Lord’s Big Book of Book Titles: When You Don’t Have Time to Read a Whole F**king Book
- Leighann Lord's Dict Jokes: ALTernate DEFinitions for Words You’ve Probably Never Heard of But Will Definitely Never Forget (2014)
- Leighann Lord's Dict Jokes: More ALTernate DEFinitions for Words You've Probably Never Heard of But Will Definitely Never Forget (2014)
- The Great Spanx Experiment: The Urban Erma's Best Humor Essays of 2011 (2014)
- I Wish Facebook Had a Hate Button: The Urban Erma's Best Humor Essays of 2012 (2014)
- Happy Black Men: The Urban Erma's Best Humor Essays of 2013 (2014)
- Real Women Do It Standing Up: Stories From the Career of a Very Funny Lady (2016)

== Awards ==
Lord was voted "Most Thought Provoking Black Female Comic" at the 4th annual Black Comedy Awards. She was also nominated for Best Play and Best Director for her one-woman show The Full Swanky at the Riant Theatre Women's Play Festival.

== Gallery ==
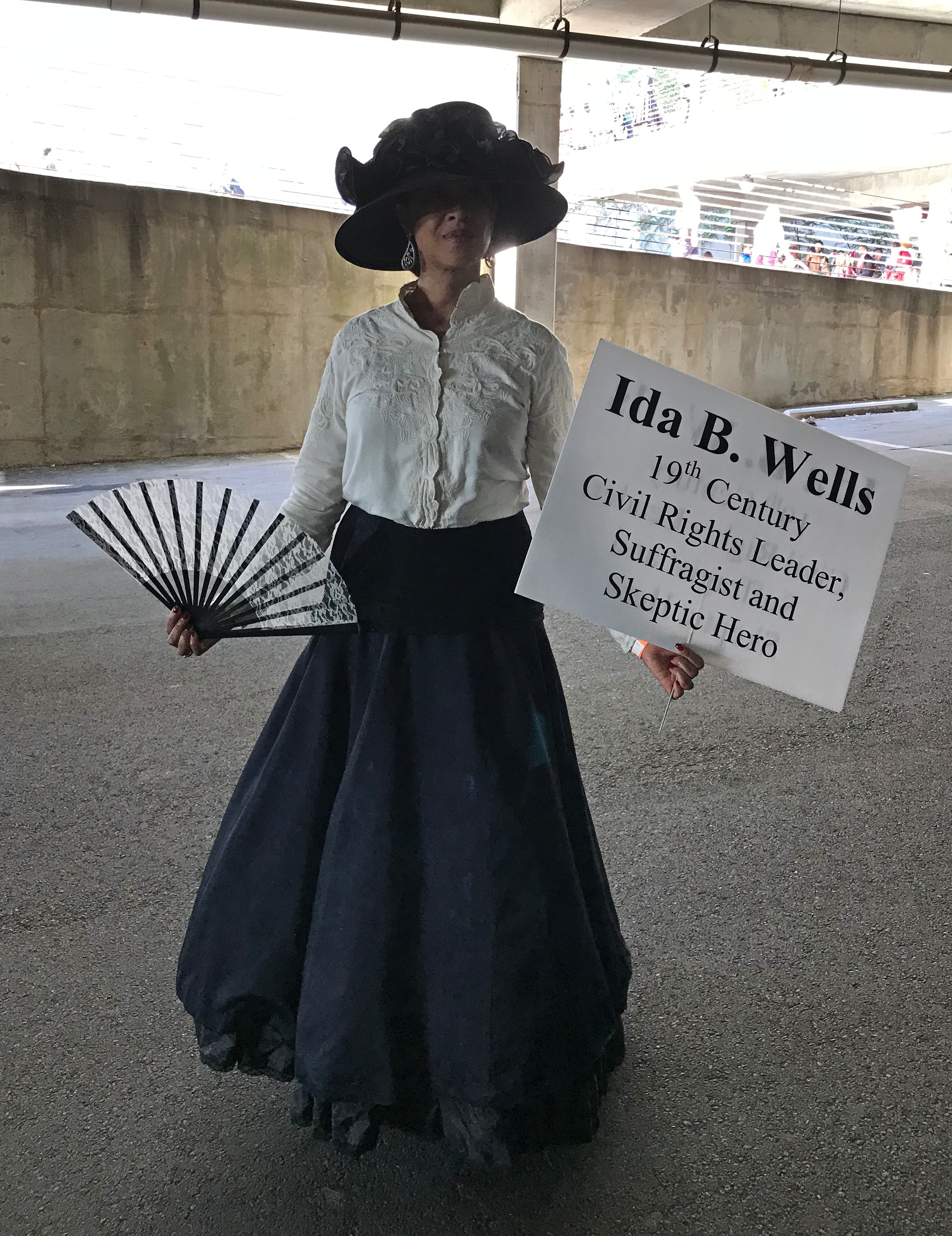
Lord dressed as Ida B. Wells at Dragon Con in 2018

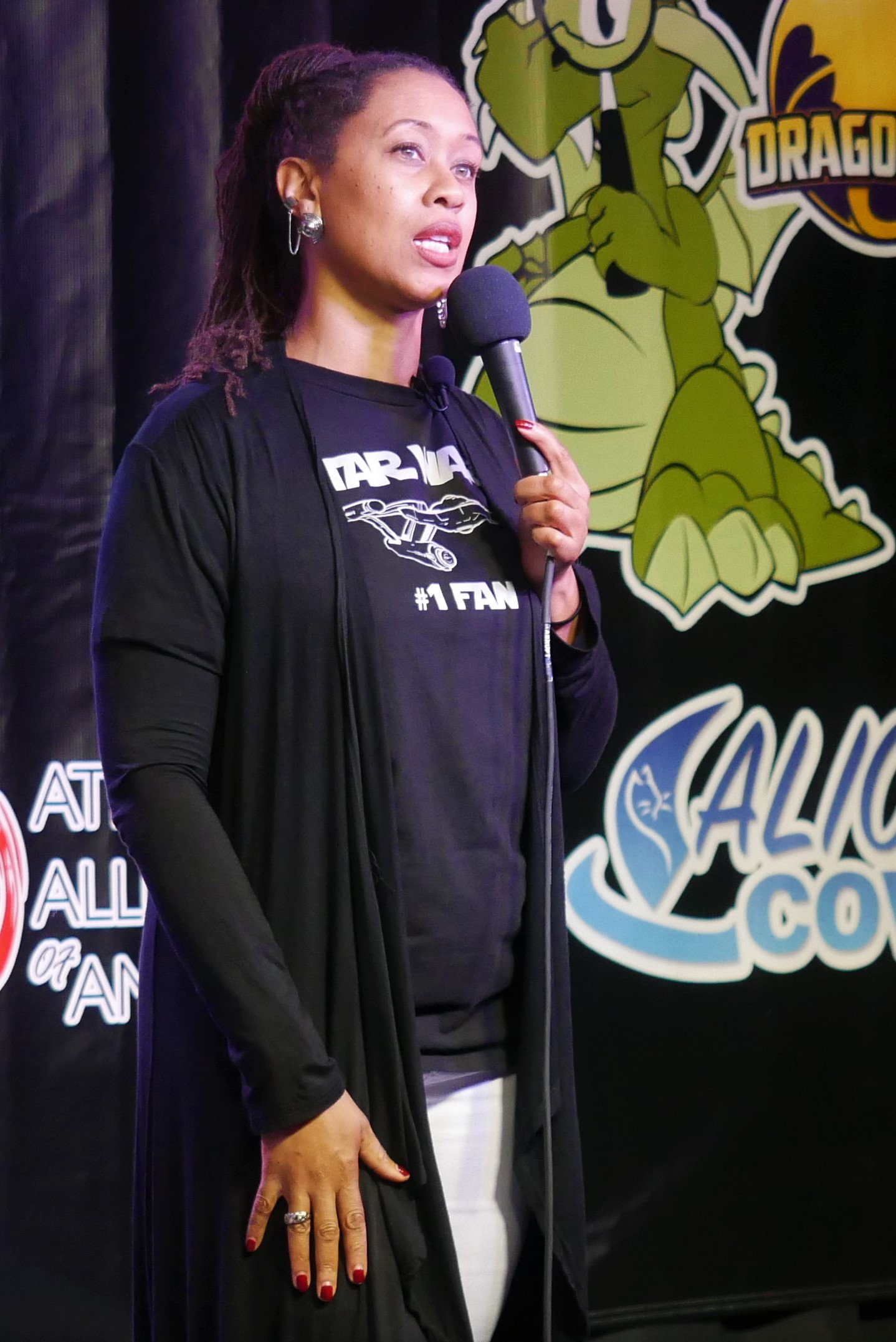
Lord presenting at Dragon Con in 2018
