= Chuck Nice =

American comedian

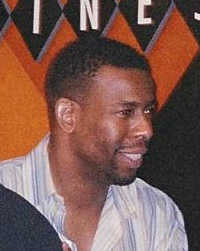
- Nice at Caroline's on Broadway
- Born: July 10, 1975 (age 51); Philadelphia, Pennsylvania, U.S.
- Occupations: Stand-up comedian; television host; radio personality; podcaster
- Years active: 1996–present
- Website: www.chucknicecomic.com

Chuck Nice (born July 10, 1975) is an American stand-up comedian and media host. He is a longtime comic co-host of StarTalk with astrophysicist Neil deGrasse Tyson and since 2022 has hosted Brain Games: On the Road for National Geographic/Disney+.

He started his career hosting a show at the New-Wave dance club The Bank. He got his name from a local DJ in Jersey City named Chuck Nice, who made mixtapes in the ’90s and early 2000s. Nice was also heard on The Radio Chick, a comedic show formerly on 92.3 Free FM, Q104.3 FM, and WNEW-FM, in New York City. Nice was a frequent contributor to VH1’s Best Week Ever.

== Career ==
=== Radio and early television ===
On New York radio, Nice was a featured comic on The Radio Chick with host Leslie Gold during its runs on WNEW-FM (102.7) and later WAXQ/Q104.3; the show subsequently moved to 92.3 Free FM (WXRK/WFNY). He went on to appear on VH1’s Best Week Ever and on truTV’s The Smoking Gun Presents: World's Dumbest....

=== Science communication ===
Nice is a regular comic co-host of StarTalk, helping translate complex ideas with humor; he also co-hosted the sports-science spinoff Playing with Science with former professional footballer Gary O'Reilly, which premiered February 1, 2017.

In 2017 he delivered a TED talk, "A funny look at the unintended consequences of technology," at TED2017 (Vancouver); it posted to TED.com in 2018.

=== Hosting and later credits ===
Nice has hosted multiple series, including HGTV’s Home Strange Home and How to Buy Like a Mega-Millionaire, and National Geographic’s Brain Games: On the Road. He appeared in the Netflix film The Week Of (2018) as Leonard.
