= Daniel Lord Smail =

Academic background
- Education: University of Michigan
- Thesis: Mapping Networks and Knowledge in Medieval Marseille 1337–62: Variations on a Theme of Mobility (1994)

Daniel Lord Smail (born 5 October 1961) is Frank B. Baird, Jr. Professor of History at Harvard University, where he teaches on the history of Mediterranean societies between 1100 and 1600, with a particular focus on the French city of Marseille. After undergraduate studies at the University of Wisconsin, he received his Ph.D. in History from the University of Michigan. He also studies deep history, the history of debt, and the medieval history of slavery. He was a featured speaker at Beyond Belief (2007) at the University of San Diego, sponsored by The Science Network, and delivered the 2024 Lawrence Stone Lectures at Princeton University.
