= President's Review Committee for Development Planning in Alaska =

President Lyndon B. Johnson created the Commission on April 2, 1964, with Executive Order 11150. He later abolished the Commission on October 2, 1964, with Executive Order 11182, and replaced it with the President's Review Committee for Developmental Planning in Alaska.

== Purpose ==
Officially known as the "Federal Reconstruction and Development Planning Commission for Alaska", it served as coordinator for existing federal programs' relief efforts in Alaska following the 1964 Alaska earthquake of March 27, 1964, which measured 9.2 on the moment magnitude scale (the largest by magnitude to hit American territory).

Specifically, the Commission

- Cooperated with Alaskan state representatives in creating surveys and scientific studies to determine what short-range and long-range government actions were needed
- Created and maintained field committees to carry out this work
- Planned federal programs in Alaska focusing on reconstruction, economic issues, and development of natural resources
- Recommended ways to carry out these proposed federal programs
- Reported its work to Congress

== Members ==
- Senator Clinton Anderson (D-NM), Chair
- Robert S. McNamara, Secretary of Defense
- Stewart L. Udall, Secretary of the Interior
- Orville L. Freeman, Secretary of Agriculture
- Luther H. Hodges, Secretary of Commerce
- W. Willard Wirtz, Secretary of Labor
- Anthony J. Celebrezze, Secretary of Health, Education, and Welfare
- Edward A. McDermott, Director, Office of Emergency Planning
- Najeeb E. Halaby, Administrator, Federal Aviation Agency
- Joseph C. Swidler, chair, Federal Power Commission
- Robert C. Weaver, Administrator, Housing and Home Finance Agency
- Eugene P. Foley, Administrator, Small Business Administration
- Dwight A. Ink, Executive Director
- Frank C. Di Luzio, Asst. to the Chair

== Accomplishments ==
The Commission recommended that Congress allocate large amounts of additional federal funds for needed reconstruction programs in Alaska. First-term Senator Bob Barlett (D-AK) introduced the commission's proposals as S. 2881 in the 88th congress (1964–1965). The resulting public law

- made $15,000,000 available for highway repair or reconstruction
- extended or forgave housing loans made through the Farmer's Home Administration
- made $25,000,000 available for urban renewal projects
- extended the term of home disaster loans made through the Small Business Administration to 30 years
- made $10,000,000 available for the Corps of Engineers to modify previously authorized civil works projects
- made $25,000,000 available to the Housing and Home Finance Administration to purchase Alaskan state bonds for capital improvements
- made $5,5000,000 available as matching funds enabling the state of Alaska to retire or adjust home mortgage loans.

== Publications ==
Response to Disaster: Report of the Federal Reconstruction and Development Planning Commission for Alaska (1964) http://hdl.handle.net/2027/mdp.39015046907385
