= Roger Bingham =

British science communicator (1948–2023)

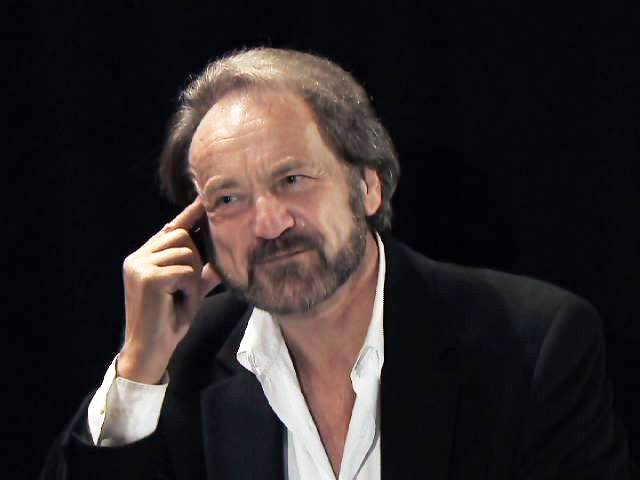
- Born: 1948; Blackpool, Lancashire, England
- Died: 21 October 2023 (aged 74–75); San Diego, California, U.S.
- Education: University College London
- Known for: Co-founder and director of the Science Network (TSN); Creator and Host of television series The Human Quest; Co-author of The Origin of Minds: Evolution, Uniqueness, and the New Science of the Self; Co-author of science-based novel Wild Card
- Spouse(s): Sheila Rodwell (m. 1970, divorced) Roger met Linda Blitz in 1984 at a Science conference hosted by Carl Sagan. Roger & Linda were married later that year on philosopher Baruch Spinoza’s birthday- November 24, 1984.
- Awards: National Magazine Award – Public Interest (1985); APA Award for Excellence in Television; Writers Guild of America Award
- Scientific career
- Fields: Neuroscience; Science communication
- Workplaces: Salk Institute for Biological Studies; University of California, San Diego

Roger Bingham (1948 – 21 October 2023) was a British science educator, author and television host based in La Jolla, California. He was co-founder and director of the Science Network (TSN), a virtual forum dedicated to science and its impact on society. Bingham was also the creator of the Beyond Belief conferences.

== Life and career ==
Bingham developed the Science and Society Unit at the Los Angeles PBS station, KCET. There, he wrote, produced and presented the Frontiers of the Mind series, which included "The Addicted Brain", "The Sexual Brain", "The Time of Our Lives", and "Inside Information", programs which have been broadcast in multiple countries and languages. Bingham also co-wrote and hosted the PBS television series The Human Quest (1996). Philip Hefner wrote in The Christian Century that "it provides a benchmark of the minimal scientific knowledge all informed persons should possess (...) Bingham and his PBS series represent the best and brightest of Western scientific intelligence today." The Human Quest episode The Nature Of Human Nature won a Writers Guild of America Award. He co-authored the novel Wild Card (1974) and The Origin of Minds: Evolution, Uniqueness, and the New Science of the Self (Harmony, 2002).

From 1995 to 1996, Bingham was a visiting associate at Caltech in the laboratory of evolutionary neuroscientist, John Allman and a visiting fellow at the Center for Evolutionary Psychology, UC Santa Barbara (co-directed by John Tooby and Leda Cosmides). Bingham and Peggy La Cerra presented an alternative to the model of evolutionary psychology, first in a paper in Proceedings of the National Academy of Sciences of the United States of America, then in The Origin of Minds: Evolution, Uniqueness, and the New Science of the Self. This model was based on the concept of adaptive representational networks (ARN). According to this theory, these networks encode the history of an individual's behavioural successes and failures in relationship to the energy costs of any particular behaviour. Hence, memory becomes an accounting mechanism for computing the energy costs of behaviour. La Cerra and Bingham called this model "Theoretical Evolutionary Neuroscience".

After the publication of The Origin of Minds, Bingham turned his attention to developing a platform for science education and communication. In 2003, with Terry Sejnowski, he initiated the project that became known as the Science Network. The launch of The Science Network was a landmark Symposium and Town Hall meeting, Stem cells: science, ethics and politics at the crossroads, held at the Salk Institute in 2004. Roger Bingham served as the director of the Science Network.

Bingham was an affiliate of the Computational Neurobiology Laboratory at the Salk Institute for Biological Studies and the Institute for Neural Computationat UC San Diego. Bingham was also a member of the Director's Council, UC San Diego Center for Brain Activity Mapping (C-BAM) and an Executive Committee member of the UCSD Temporal Dynamics of Learning Center (TDLC).

In 2009, Bingham was named a member of the Board of Advisers of Scientific American.

Bingham died in San Diego, California on 21 October 2023.

== Books ==
- The Origin of Minds: Evolution, Uniqueness, and the New Science of the Self (2002) Peggy La Cerra and Roger Bingham
- Wild Card (1974) Raymond Hawkey and Roger Bingham

== Awards ==
- Writers Guild of America Award in Documentary, Current Events, The Human Quest: The Nature Of Human Nature, 1996, with Carl Byker
- American Psychological Association Award for Excellence in Television, Inside Information: The Brain and How It Works, 1992, with John Rubin
- National Magazine Award in Public Interest, Technology for Peace: The Politics of Mistrust, Science, 1986
