= Audie Award for Narration by the Author =

Literary award for audiobook

Audie Award for Narration by the Author or Authors
- Awarded for: Excellence in audiobook narration for an audiobook narrated by the author
- Sponsored by: Audio Publishers Association (APA)
- Date: Annually
- First award: 1998

The Audie Award for Narration by the Author or Authors is one of the Audie Awards presented annually by the Audio Publishers Association (APA). It awards excellence in audiobook narration for an audiobook narrated by the author released in a given year. Before 2002 the award was given as the Audie Award for Solo Narration by the Author or Authors. It has been awarded since 1998.

== Winners and finalists ==
=== 1990s ===
Year	Audiobook	Author/Narrator	Publisher	Result	Ref.
1998 3rd	Sula (1973)	Toni Morrison	Random House Audio	Winner	
1998 3rd	My Brother (1997)	Jamaica Kincaid	Penguin Audiobooks	Finalist	
1998 3rd	Wobegon Boy (1997)	Garrison Keillor	HighBridge Audio	Finalist	
1999 4th	Still Me (1998)	Christopher Reeve	Random House Audio	Winner	
1999 4th	Big Screen Drive-In Theater (1998)	Donald Davis	August House	Finalist	
1999 4th	Reporting Live (1999)	Lesley Stahl	Simon & Schuster Audio	Finalist	

=== 2000s ===
Year	Audiobook	Author/Narrator	Publisher	Result	Ref.
2000 5th	The Exorcist (1971)	William Peter Blatty	NewStar Media	Winner	
2000 5th	Hannibal (1999)	Thomas Harris	Bantam Doubleday Dell Audio	Finalist	
2000 5th	'Tis (1999)	Frank McCourt	Simon & Schuster Audio	Finalist	
2001 6th	The Measure of a Man: A Spiritual Autobiography (2000)	Sidney Poitier	HarperAudio	Winner	
2001 6th	From This Day Forward (2000)	Cokie Roberts and Steve Roberts	Brilliance Audio	Finalist	
2001 6th	John Glenn (1999)	John Glenn	Bantam Doubleday Dell Audio	Finalist	
2002 7th	Ava's Man (2002)	Rick Bragg	Random House Audio	Winner	
2002 7th	Believing It All (2002)	Marc Parent	Time Warner AudioBooks	Finalist	
2002 7th	The Bonesetter's Daughter (2001)	Amy Tan (narrated with Joan Chen)	New Millennium Audio	Finalist	
2003 8th	Standing in the Rainbow (2002)	Fannie Flagg	Random House Audio	Winner	
2003 8th	Lucky Man (2002)	Michael J. Fox	Simon & Schuster Audio	Finalist	
2003 8th	Nothing Is Impossible (2002)	Christopher Reeve	Simon & Schuster Audio	Finalist	
2003 8th	Tom and Huck Don't Live Here Anymore (2001)	Ron Powers	Audio Partners	Finalist	
2003 8th	Vernon Can Read! (2001)	Vernon Jordan (written with Annette Gordon-Reed)	BBC Audiobooks America	Finalist	
2004 9th	Naked in Baghdad (2003)	Anne Garrels	Audio Renaissance	Winner	
2004 9th	I Am the Central Park Jogger (2003)	Trisha Meili	Simon & Schuster Audio	Finalist	
2004 9th	Lies and the Lying Liars Who Tell Them (2003)	Al Franken	HighBridge Audio	Finalist	
2004 9th	Madam Secretary (2003)	Madeleine Albright	BBC Audiobooks America	Finalist	
2004 9th	The Great Unraveling (2003)	Paul Krugman	HarperAudio	Finalist	
2004 9th	The Lakota Way (2002)	Joseph M. Marshall III	Makoche	Finalist	
2005 10th	Against All Enemies (2004)	Richard A. Clarke	Simon & Schuster Audio	Winner	
2005 10th	Dress Your Family in Corduroy and Denim (2004)	David Sedaris	AudioBooks	Finalist	
2005 10th	My Life (2004)	Bill Clinton	Random House Audio	Finalist	
2005 10th	Off the Cuff (2004)	Carson Kressley	HighBridge Audio	Finalist	
2005 10th	There and Back Again (2004)	Sean Astin (written with Joe Layden)	Audio Renaissance	Finalist	
2006 11th	The Tender Bar (2005)	J. R. Moehringer	Time Warner AudioBooks	Winner	
2006 11th	1776 (2005)	David McCullough	Simon & Schuster	Finalist	
2006 11th	Kiss Me Like a Stranger (2005)	Gene Wilder	Audio Renaissance	Finalist	
2006 11th	My Life So Far (1999)	Jane Fonda	Books on Tape	Finalist	
2006 11th	The Truth (with Jokes) (2005)	Al Franken	Brilliance Audio	Finalist	
2007 12th	The Tortilla Curtain (1995)	T. C. Boyle	Blackstone Audio	Winner	
2007 12th	Marian McPartland's Jazz World: All in Good Time (1975)	Marian McPartland	Blackstone Audio	Finalist	
2007 12th	Speedbumps: Flooring It Through Hollywood (2006)	Teri Garr	Penguin Audio	Finalist	
2007 12th	Teacher Man (2005)	Frank McCourt	Simon & Schuster Audio	Finalist	
2007 12th	The Mighty and the Almighty (2006)	Madeleine Albright	HarperAudio	Finalist	
2008 13th	Pontoon: A Novel of Lake Wobegon (2007)	Garrison Keillor	HighBridge Audio	Winner	
2008 13th	Animal, Vegetable, Miracle (2007)	Barbara Kingsolver (narrated with Camille Kingsolver and Steven L. Hopp)	HarperAudio	Finalist	
2008 13th	Here If You Need Me (2007)	Kate Braestrup	Hachette Audio	Finalist	
2008 13th	Michael Tolliver Lives (2007)	Armistead Maupin	HarperAudio	Finalist	
2008 13th	Neverwhere (1996)	Neil Gaiman	HarperAudio	Finalist	
2008 13th	Traveler (2007)	Ron McLarty	Recorded Books	Finalist	
2009 14th	When You Are Engulfed in Flames (2008)	David Sedaris	Hachette Audio	Winner	
2009 14th	Just Who Will You Be? (2008)	Maria Shriver	HyperionAudio	Finalist	
2009 14th	Ladies of Liberty (2009)	Cokie Roberts	HarperAudio	Finalist	
2009 14th	Letter to My Daughter (2008)	Maya Angelou	Random House Audio	Finalist	
2009 14th	The Girl Who Stopped Swimming (2008)	Joshilyn Jackson	Hachette Audio	Finalist	

=== 2010s ===
Year	Audiobook	Author/Narrator	Publisher	Result	Ref.
2010 15th	Odd and the Frost Giants (2008)	Neil Gaiman	HarperChildrensAudio	Winner	
2010 15th	Manhood for Amateurs (2009)	Michael Chabon	HarperAudio	Finalist	
2010 15th	A Little Bit Wicked (2009)	Kristin Chenoweth	Oasis Audio	Finalist	
2010 15th	Baseball Great (2009)	Tim Green	HarperChildrensAudio	Finalist	
2010 15th	Half Broke Horses (2009)	Jeannette Walls	Simon & Schuster Audio	Finalist	
2011 16th	Nanny McPhee Returns (2010)	Emma Thompson	Macmillan Audio	Winner	
2011 16th	Crazy Heart (1987)	Thomas Cobb	HarperAudio	Finalist	
2011 16th	A Christmas Blizzard (2009)	Garrison Keillor	HighBridge Audio	Finalist	
2011 16th	The Color Purple (1982)	Alice Walker	Recorded Books	Finalist	
2011 16th	Role Models (2010)	John Waters	Tantor Audio	Finalist	
2012 17th	Beauty Queens (2011)	Libba Bray	Scholastic Audio	Winner	
2012 17th	Bossypants (2011)	Tina Fey	Hachette Audio	Finalist	
2012 17th	Drama (2011)	John Lithgow	HarperAudio	Finalist	
2012 17th	Seriously…I'm Kidding (2011)	Ellen DeGeneres	Hachette Audio	Finalist	
2012 17th	Stories I Only Tell My Friends (2011)	Rob Lowe	Macmillan Audio	Finalist	
2013 18th	Society's Child (2008)	Janis Ian	Audible	Winner	
2013 18th	American Dervish (2012)	Ayad Akhtar	Hachette Audio	Finalist	
2013 18th	How to Be Black (2012)	Baratunde Thurston	HarperAudio	Finalist	
2013 18th	Most Talkative (2012)	Andy Cohen	Macmillan Audio	Finalist	
2013 18th	When It Happens to You (2012)	Molly Ringwald	HarperAudio	Finalist	
2013 18th	Yes, Chef (2012)	Marcus Samuelsson (written with Veronica Chambers)	Random House Audio	Finalist	
2014 19th	Still Foolin' 'Em: Where I've Been, Where I'm Going, and Where the Hell Are My Keys? (2013)	Billy Crystal	Macmillan Audio	Winner	
2014 19th	Grace: A Memoir (2012)	Grace Coddington (written with Michael Roberts)	Random House Audio/Books on Tape	Finalist	
2014 19th	I, Rhoda (2013)	Valerie Harper	Simon & Schuster Audio	Finalist	
2014 19th	Love, Dishonor, Marry, Die, Cherish, Perish (2013)	David Rakoff	Random House Audio/Books on Tape	Finalist	
2014 19th	The Ocean at the End of the Lane (2013)	Neil Gaiman	HarperAudio	Finalist	
2014 19th	Shirley Jones (2013)	Shirley Jones	Tantor Audio	Finalist	
2015 20th	Not My Father's Son (2014)	Alan Cumming	HarperAudio	Winner	
2015 20th	A Fighting Chance (2014)	Elizabeth Warren	Macmillan Audio	Finalist	
2015 20th	Herbie Hancock: Possibilities (2014)	Herbie Hancock (written with Lisa Dickey)	Penguin Random House Audio	Finalist	
2015 20th	What I Know for Sure (2014)	Oprah Winfrey	Macmillan Audio	Finalist	
2015 20th	Yes Please (2014)	Amy Poehler (narrated with Carol Burnett, Seth Meyers, Mike Schur, Eileen and William Poehler, Patrick Stewart, and Kathleen Turner)	HarperAudio	Finalist	
2016 21st	Born with Teeth (2015)	Kate Mulgrew	Hachette Audio	Winner	
2016 21st	The Art of Asking (2014)	Amanda Palmer	Hachette Audio	Finalist	
2016 21st	Furiously Happy (2015)	Jenny Lawson	Macmillan Audio	Finalist	
2016 21st	I Must Say (2014)	Martin Short	HarperAudio	Finalist	
2016 21st	Thirteen Ways of Looking (2015)	Colum McCann	Books on Tape/Penguin Random House Audio	Finalist	
2017 22nd	A Life in Parts (2016)	Bryan Cranston	Simon & Schuster Audio	Winner	
2017 22nd	Dear Mr. You (2015)	Mary-Louise Parker	Simon & Schuster Audio	Finalist	
2017 22nd	The Girl with the Lower Back Tattoo (2016)	Amy Schumer	Simon & Schuster Audio	Finalist	
2017 22nd	In Such Good Company (2016)	Carol Burnett	Penguin Random House Audio/Books on Tape	Finalist	
2017 22nd	LaRose (2016)	Louise Erdrich	HarperAudio	Finalist	
2017 22nd	The View from the Cheap Seats (2016)	Neil Gaiman	HarperAudio	Finalist	
2018 23rd	Norse Mythology (2017)	Neil Gaiman	HarperAudio	Winner	
2018 23rd	Astrophysics for People in a Hurry (2017)	Neil deGrasse Tyson	Blackstone Audio	Finalist	
2018 23rd	Born a Crime (2016)	Trevor Noah	Audible	Finalist	
2018 23rd	Love Poems (1997) and A Good Cry (2017)	Nikki Giovanni	HarperAudio	Finalist	
2018 23rd	This Fight Is Our Fight (2017)	Elizabeth Warren	Macmillan Audio	Finalist	
2019 24th	The Secret of Nightingale Wood (2016)	Lucy Strange	Scholastic Audio	Winner	
2019 24th	How Not to Get Shot (2018)	D. L. Hughley	HarperAudio	Finalist	
2019 24th	In Pieces (2018)	Sally Field	Hachette Audio	Finalist	
2019 24th	My Pride (2017)	Alton Fitzgerald White	Blackstone Audio	Finalist	
2019 24th	The Poet X (2018)	Elizabeth Acevedo	HarperAudio	Finalist	
2019 24th	Promise Me, Dad (2017)	Joe Biden	Audible	Finalist	

=== 2020s ===
Year	Audiobook	Author/Narrator	Publisher	Result	Ref.
2020 25th	With the Fire on High (2019)	Elizabeth Acevedo	HarperAudio	Winner	
2020 25th	Becoming (2018)	Michelle Obama	Penguin Random House Audio	Finalist	
2020 25th	Inside Out (2019)	Demi Moore	HarperAudio	Finalist	
2020 25th	Madame Badobedah (2019)	Sophie Dahl	Bolinda Audio	Finalist	
2020 25th	Shortest Way Home (2019)	Pete Buttigieg	HighBridge Audio (Recorded Books)	Finalist	
2020 25th	Tough Love (2019)	Susan Rice	Simon & Schuster Audio	Finalist	
2021 26th	More Myself (2020)	Alicia Keys	Macmillan Audio	Winner	
2021 26th	Acid for the Children (2019)	Flea	Hachette Audio	Finalist	
2021 26th	Hollywood Park (2020)	Mikel Jollett	Macmillan Audio	Finalist	
2021 26th	Homie (2020)	Danez Smith	HighBridge Audio (Recorded Books)	Finalist	
2021 26th	In Dependence (2009)	Sarah Ladipo Manyika	Recorded Books	Finalist	
2021 26th	Little Weirds (2019)	Jenny Slate	Hachette Audio	Finalist	
2022 27th	A Promised Land (2020)	Barack Obama	Penguin Random House Audio	Winner	
2022 27th	All the Rage: A Partial Memoir in Two Acts and a Prologue	Brad Fraser	Penguin Random House Canada	Finalist	
2022 27th	Going There	Katie Couric	Hachette Audio	Finalist	
2022 27th	Stories to Tell (2021)	Richard Marx	Simon & Schuster Audio	Finalist	
2022 27th	The Truth About Lies	Aja Raden	Brilliance Publishing	Finalist	
2022 27th	Vulnerable AF	Tarriona Ball	Andrews McMeel Publishing	Finalist	
2023 28th	Finding Me (2022)	Viola Davis	Harper Audio	Winner	
2023 28th	Apparently There Were Complaints	Sharon Gless	Simon & Schuster Audio	Finalist	
2023 28th	Hello, Molly!	Molly Shannon	HarperAudio	Finalist	
2023 28th	Ten Steps to Nanette	Hannah Gadsby	Penguin Random House Audio	Finalist	
2023 28th	Waypoints	Sam Heughan	Hachette Audio	Finalist	
2024 29th	It. Goes. So. Fast. - The Year of No Do-Overs	Mary Louise Kelly	Macmillan Audio	Winner	
2024 29th	The Covenant of Water (2023)	Abraham Verghese	Recorded Books	Finalist	
2024 29th	Sisters of the Lost Marsh	Lucy Strange	Scholastic Audio	Finalist	
2024 29th	The Light We Carry	Michelle Obama	Penguin Random House Audio	Finalist	
2024 29th	Making It So	Patrick Stewart	Simon & Schuster Audio	Finalist	
2025 30th	Bits and Pieces	Whoopi Goldberg	Blackstone Publishing	Winner	
2025 30th	The 23rd Hero	Rebecca Anne Nguyen	Castle Bridge Media	Finalist	
2025 30th	Bookshops & Bonedust	Travis Baldree	Macmillan Audio	Finalist	
2025 30th	Knife	Salman Rushdie	Penguin Random House Audio	Finalist	
2025 30th	Sorry for the Inconvenience	Farah Naz Rishi	Brilliance Publishing	Finalist	
2026 31st	Everything Is Tuberculosis (2025)	John Green	Penguin Random House Audio	Finalist	
2026 31st	Ditching the Sky	Heidi A. Porch	Heidi A. Porch	Finalist	
2026 31st	Food for Thought	Alton Brown	Simon & Schuster Audio	Finalist	
2026 31st	I Am Nobody's Slave	Lee Hawkins	HarperAudio	Finalist	
2026 31st	Separation of Church and Hate	John Fugelsang	Simon & Schuster Audio	Finalist	
