= White house garden =

White House garden could refer to either of the following White House gardens:

- White House Rose Garden
- White House Vegetable Garden
