= The Michelle Obama Musiaqualogy =

Soundtrack to Michelle Obama's memoir

The Michelle Obama Musiaqualogy is an American music collection curated by Questlove which serves as a soundtrack to Michelle Obama's 2018 book Becoming. The collection has 300 tracks and includes music by Michael Jackson, Prince, Kendrick Lamar, Beyoncé, Erykah Badu, Aretha Franklin and others. The soundtrack is divided into three parts, the first playlist spanning from 1964 to 1979, the second playlist spanning from 1980 to 1997, and the third playlist spanning from 1997 to 2018.
