= Michelle Obama: The Light Podcast =

American podcast

- Genre: Talk
- Format: Audio
- Language: English

Cast and voices
- Hosted by: Michelle Obama

Production
- Length: 30-40 mins

Technical specifications
- Audio format: MP3

Publication
- No. of episodes: 9
- Original release: March 7, 2023
- Provider: Audible

Related
- Website: www.audible.com/pd/Michelle-Obama-The-Light-Podcast-Podcast/B0BTJ8DDXD

Michelle Obama: The Light Podcast is a podcast hosted by former First Lady of the United States Michelle Obama based on topics in her 2022 book The Light We Carry: Overcoming in Uncertain Times and features conversations held during her live book tour.

The podcast debuted on Audible on March 7, 2023, following the announcement of its launch in February 2023.

== Episodes ==
No.	Title	Original release date
1	"Kids Just Want Our Gladness with Hoda Kotb"	7 March 2023
2	"We All Have A Light with Tyler Perry"	14 March 2023
3	"Telling Myself That I Was Enough with Conan O'Brien"	21 March 2023
4	"Decoding Fear with Ellen DeGeneres"	28 March 2023
5	"The Power of Small with David Letterman"	4 April 2023
6	"Excellence is my Practice with Gayle King"	11 April 2023
7	"The Friendship Bubble with Elizabeth Alexander"	18 April 2023
8	"Barack is My Home with Oprah Winfrey"	25 April 2023
9	"Our Hair is a Portal into Our Souls with Tracee Ellis Ross"	26 July 2023
