= American Grown =

Book by Michelle Obama

- Author: Michelle Obama
- Subject: White House Vegetable Garden
- Genre: Non-fiction
- Publisher: Crown
- Publication date: May 29, 2012
- Media type: Hardcover
- Pages: 272 pp.
- ISBN: 978-0-307-95602-6
- Followed by: Becoming

American Grown: The Story of the White House Kitchen Garden and Gardens Across America is a book by First Lady of the United States Michelle Obama published in 2012. The book promotes healthy eating and documents the White House Kitchen Garden through the seasons. The garden, planted in 2009 on the White House's South Lawn, promoted the first lady's Let's Move! initiative to end childhood obesity. Journalist Lyric Winik assisted Obama in the writing of American Grown. Proceeds from the book were donated to the National Park Foundation.

== Contents ==
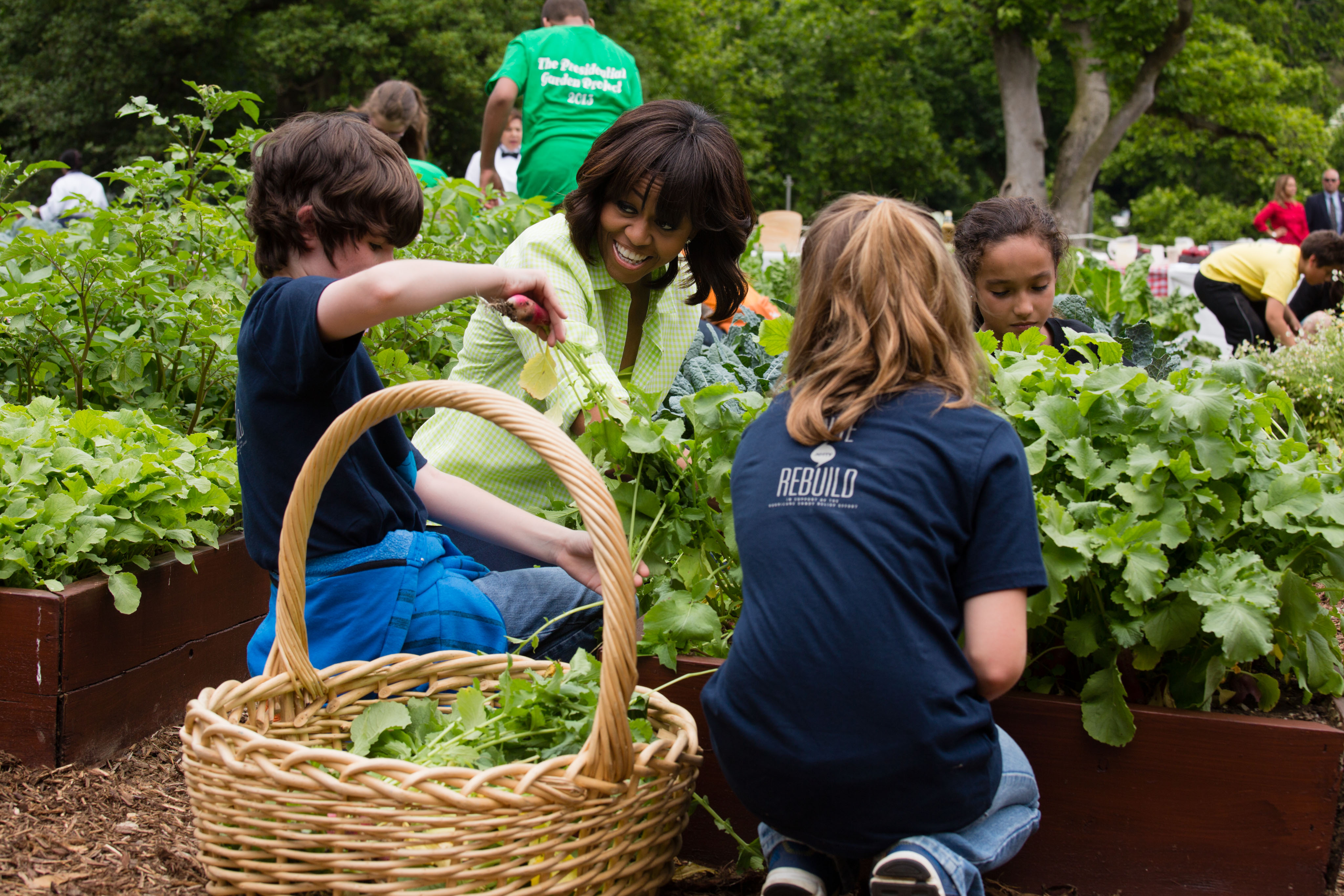
Obama harvesting vegetables with school students in the White House Kitchen Garden

American Grown is divided into four sections (one for each season) and includes color photographs of vegetables, as well as recipes, instructions for making a compost bin, and stories about community gardens in the United States. The book delves into the history of gardens at the White House, including First Lady Eleanor Roosevelt's victory garden and Thomas Jefferson's attempts to grow a four-foot-long cucumber. Obama describes how the Kitchen Garden's Jefferson beds include a quote from the former president that is also a guiding principle for the garden: "the failure of one thing repaired by the success of another; and instead of one harvest, a continued one throughout the year."

American Grown blends the first lady's personal gardening experiences with stories from the White House Kitchen Garden. Obama writes about the time in her life when she had "no idea that tomatoes didn’t come in green plastic trays, covered by cellophane, and that they could be any color other than pale red." The portion of the book devoted to the White House beehive describes how an apple tree in the Children's Garden produced fruit for the first time in 25 years after the introduction of bees. Through her research for the book, Obama discovered that her maternal grandmother tended a community victory garden in Chicago.

== Reception ==
A review in The New York Times called Obama's book "charming and thought-provoking." Writer Dominique Browning also said that the garden calls the country's attention to the connection between food quality and health.
