= Becoming (book) =

2018 memoir by Michelle Obama

- Author: Michelle Obama
- Language: English
- Genre: Memoir; autobiography
- Published: November 13, 2018
- Publisher: Crown (North America); Viking Press (Commonwealth)
- Publication place: United States
- Media type: Print
- Pages: 448
- ISBN: 978-1-5247-6313-8 (Hardcover)
- Preceded by: American Grown
- Followed by: The Light We Carry
- Website: becomingmichelleobama.com

Becoming is the first memoir by former First Lady of the United States Michelle Obama, published on November 13, 2018. Described by the author as a deeply personal experience, the book talks about her roots and how she found her voice, as well as her time in the White House, her public health campaign, and her role as a mother. The book is published by Crown and was released in 24 languages. One million copies were donated to First Book, an American nonprofit organization which provides books to children.

It was the highest-selling book published in the United States in 2018, setting the record 15 days after its publication, with over two million copies sold.

== Background ==
The 448-page memoir was published on November 13, 2018. Barack Obama said Michelle had a ghostwriter. The Observer notes that Becoming's acknowledgments section thanks a team of people involved in finishing the book.

== Synopsis ==
The book's 24 chapters (plus a preface and epilogue) are divided into three sections: Becoming Me, Becoming Us, and Becoming More.

The preface sets the stage for Michelle Obama's story to open by sketching a scene in her post-First Lady life. Becoming Me traces Obama's early life growing up on the South Side of Chicago with her parents, Fraser and Marian Robinson, in an upstairs apartment where she got her first piano lessons and learnt to be an independent girl under the nurturing care of her parents. There, Obama shared a bedroom with her brother Craig. The book continues through her education at Princeton University and Harvard Law School to her early career as a lawyer at the law firm Sidley Austin, where she met Barack Obama. While this section talks considerably at length about Obama's Princeton experience and Sidley Austin, Harvard Law school's experiences are mentioned marginally by comparison.

Becoming Us departs from the beginning of the Obamas' romantic relationship and follows their marriage and the beginning of his political career in the Illinois State Senate. This section also notes Obama's career "swerve" from corporate law to the non-profit realm as she continued to work while raising her daughters and speaking at political events, becoming gradually more involved in her husband's campaign. The book shares Obama's balance between her position as the first African American First Lady of the United States of America, her motherly duties, and her marital commitments. The section ends with election night in 2008 when Barack Obama was elected President of the United States.

Becoming More takes the readers through Barack Obama's presidency, Michelle Obama's focus on her Let's Move campaign, and her role of "head mom in chief" to her two daughters - Malia and Sasha Obama, along with the other aspects of the Obama's life as first family. The Epilogue talks about the last day of Obamas in the White House which was also Donald Trump's inauguration ceremony and Michelle Obama's reflection on Optimism. She also expresses her lack of desire to ever run for office.

== Book sales ==
Total book sales, including hardcover, audio, and e-book editions, were around 725,000 copies in the United States and Canada during its first day, making it the second best-selling debut for any book in 2018. Bob Woodward's Fear: Trump in the White House holds the record after selling around 900,000 copies during its first day. However, Barnes and Noble reported that Becoming surpassed Fear in first-week sales and had more first-week sales of any adult book since Go Set a Watchman in 2015. The book sold 1.4 million copies in its first week. After 15 days, the book became the best-selling book in the US for the year 2018.

By March 26, 2019, Becoming had sold 10 million copies. According to The New York Times, as of November 2020, the book has "sold 14 million copies worldwide, including more than 8 million in the U.S. and Canada".

== Reception ==
It was an Oprah's Book Club 2.0 selection.

Hannah Giogris, a writer from The Atlantic, used the words "refreshing" and "striking" to describe the book.

In 2020, the audiobook edition won the Grammy Award for Best Spoken Word Album and was named one of the top ten Amazing Audiobooks for Young Adults by the American Library Association. It was also a finalist for the 2020 Audie Award for Narration by the Author; finalist for the 2020 Audie Award for Audiobook of the Year; and won the 2020 Audie Award for Autobiography or Memoir.

== Soundtrack ==
American musician Questlove curated a soundtrack for the book called The Michelle Obama Musiaqualogy.

== Tour ==
In November 2018, Michelle Obama went on a national book tour conducted in arenas, often to sold-out crowds starting in Chicago at the United Center. Obama previewed the book and tour on Chicago's Windy City Live daytime television show at her alma mater, Whitney M. Young Magnet High School on Chicago's Near West Side.

The initial tour included 12 venues in 10 cities but expanded with its popularity; as of February 2019, another 21 cities had been added, including six in Europe and four in Canada.

== Film ==
In May 2020, a documentary film based on the book was released on Netflix, following Obama through her book tour. The documentary features footage of Obama's travels behind-the-scenes of the tour and clips of her interviews onstage with moderators, including Oprah Winfrey and Stephen Colbert.

== Translations ==
- Arabic: وأصبحتُ, translated by M. Abdul Ahad and A. Salem (Hachette Antoine, 2019: ISBN 9786144693063)
- Bulgarian: Моята история, translated by Marin Zagorchev (Softpres, 2019: ISBN 9786191515011)
- Catalan: La meva història, translated by Núria Parés Sellarès, Mar Albacar i Morgó, Esther Roig Giménez and Anna Llisterri i Boix (Rosa Vents, 2018: ISBN 9788419394149)
- Danish: Min historie (Lindhardt & Ringhof, 2018: ISBN 9788711693100)
- Dutch: Mijn verhaal, translated by Rob de Ridder (Hollands Diep, 2018: ISBN 9789048840762)
- Estonian: Minu lugu (Helios Kirjastus, 2018: ISBN 9789949610686)
- Finnish: Minun tarinani, translated by Ilkka Rekiaro (Otava, 2018: ISBN 9789511321224)
- French: Devenir, translated by Odile Demange and Isabelle Taudière (Fayard, 2018: ISBN 9782213706115)
- German: BECOMING – Meine Geschichte, translated by Harriet Fricke, Tanja Handels, Elke Link, Andrea O'Brien, Jan Schönherr and Henriette Zeltner (Goldmann, 2018: ISBN 9783442314874)
- Hungarian: Így lettem, translated by Böbe Weisz and Éva Andó (HVG Könyvek, 2018: ISBN 9789633045725)
- Lithuanian: Mano istorija, translated by Inga Būdevytytė, Indrė Kaulavičiutė and Jovita Liutkutė (Alma Littera, 2018: ISBN 9786090135327)
- Persian: شدن, translated by Ali Salami (Mehr Andish, 2018: ISBN 9786006395715)
- Portuguese: Minha História, translated by Débora Landsberg, Denise Bottmann and Renato Marques (Objetiva, 2018: ISBN 9788547000646)
- Romanian: Povestea mea, translated by Corina Hadareanu (Litera, 2018: ISBN 9789569646621)
- Spanish: Mi historia (Plaza & Janés, 2018: ISBN 9789569646621)
