= Rebecca Anne Nguyen =

American novelist and playwright

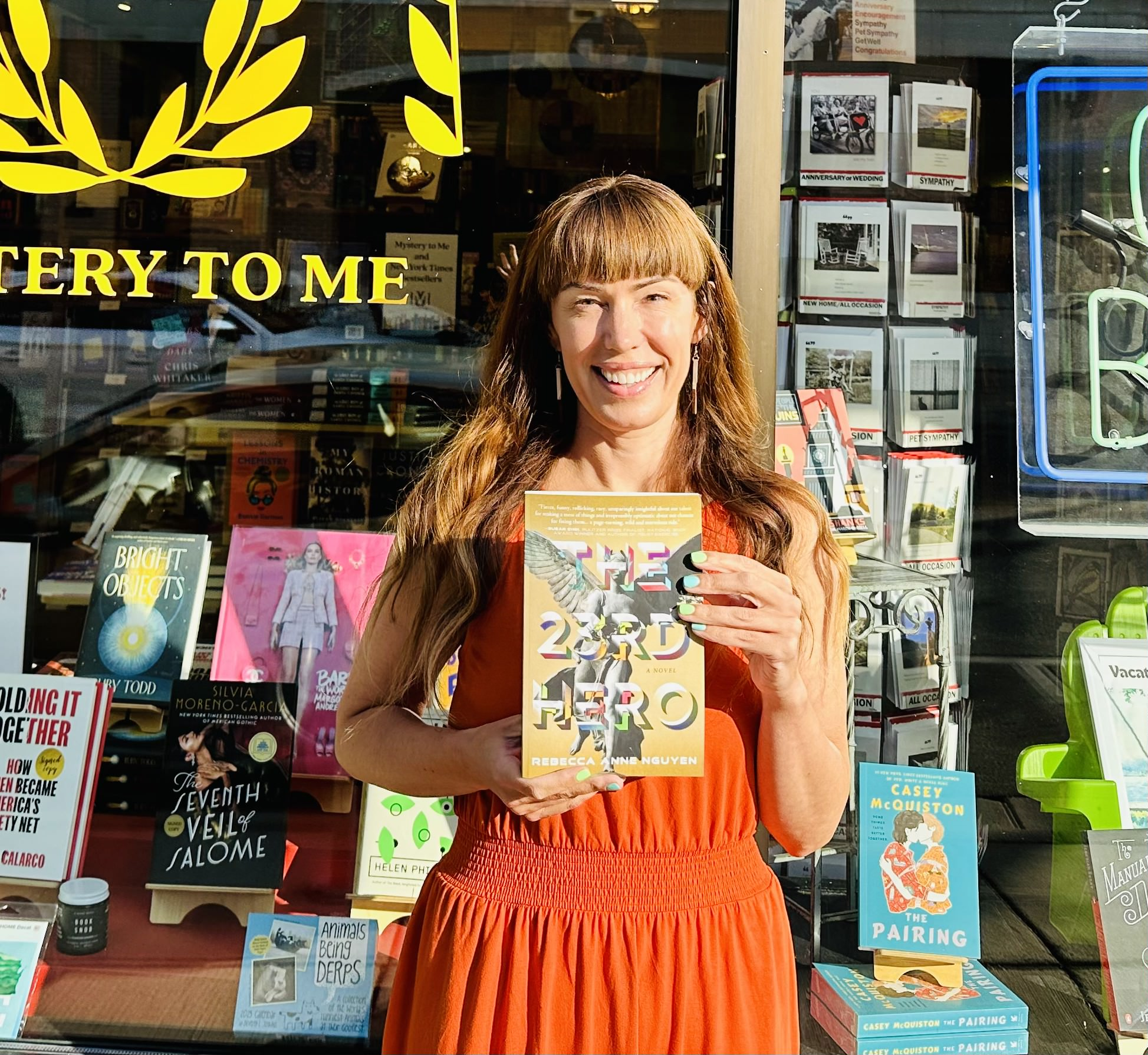
Nguyen in 2024

Rebecca Anne Nguyen (born 1981) is an American novelist and playwright. She is the author of the novel The 23rd Hero and co-author of the memoir Where War Ends: A Combat Veteran's 2,700-Mile Journey to Heal.

== Early life and education ==
Nguyen (née Voss) was born in Waukesha, Wisconsin, to a public school teacher and a social worker. She attended public schools. She earned her BFA in musical theatre at the University of Miami.

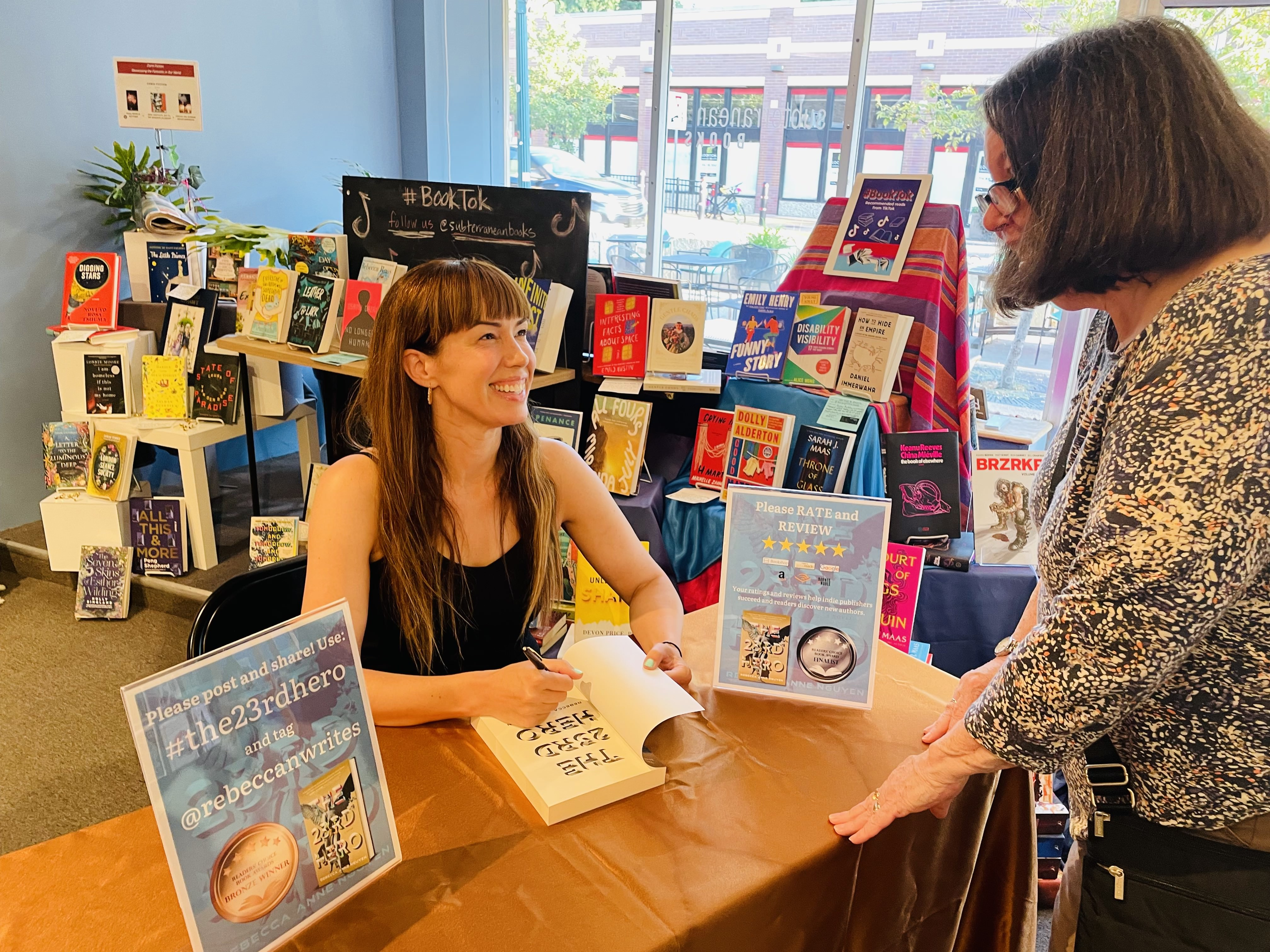
Nguyen in 2024

== Writing career ==
In 2019, Nguyen co-wrote a memoir with her brother, U.S. Army veteran Tom Voss. The book charts his on-foot journey across America following his combat experiences during Operation Iraqi Freedom. Where War Ends: A Combat Veteran's 2,700-Mile Journey To Heal was published by New World Library and won a Foreword Indie Award for Best Autobiography/Memoir (silver).

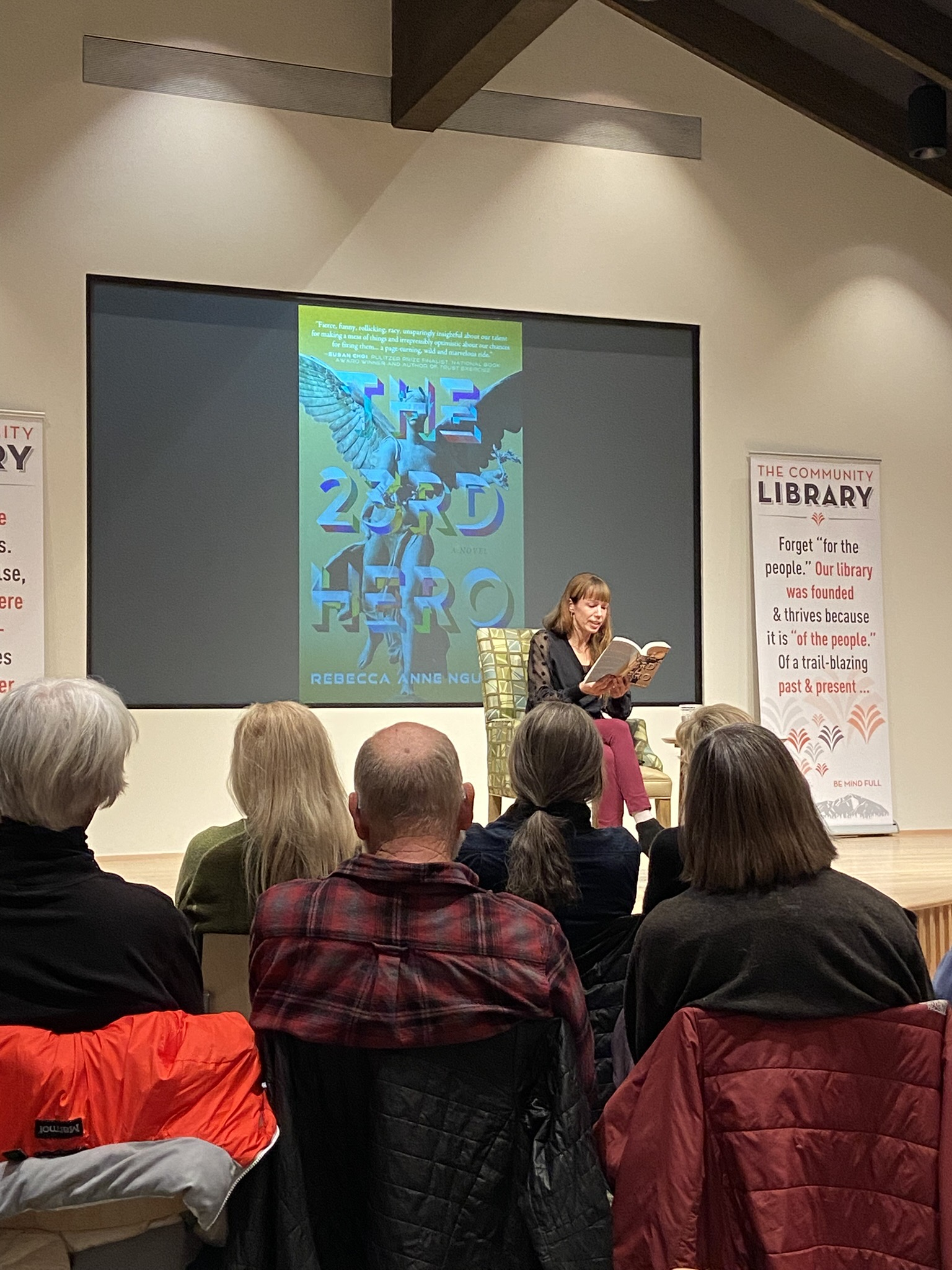
Nguyen in 2024

Nguyen's stage play, Hypotheticals, is a neurodivergent romantic comedy about a woman who kisses a stranger in an elevator on her way to mandatory psychotherapy. When the stranger turns out to be her new therapist, they begin a professional relationship while trying to ignore their growing attraction for each other. The play received staged readings at World Premiere Wisconsin, Cincinnati Lab Theatre, and Epiphanies New Works Festival, where it was the 2023 festival winner. The play has received two productions, with a world premiere at Kith & Kin Theatre in Milwaukee and a regional premiere production at Wild Imaginings Theatre in Waco, Texas.

Nguyen's fiction debut was published by Castle Bridge Media in 2024. The 23rd Hero is a time travel romance about a woman with an extraordinary memory who travels to sixteenth-century France to stop climate change before it begins. The novel was awarded the 2024 Readers' Choice Award for Best Adult Novel (bronze). The 23rd Hero audiobook was named a top-five finalist in the Best Narration By the Author(s) category for the 2025 Audie Awards alongside Salman Rushdie and Whoopi Goldberg.

== Bibliography ==
=== Fiction ===
- The 23rd Hero (2024) ISBN 979-8-9895934-1-5
- Hypotheticals (2024) play

=== Nonfiction ===
- Where War Ends: A Combat Veteran's 2,700-Mile Journey to Heal — Recovering From PTSD and Moral Injury Through Meditation (2019) ISBN 978-1-60868-599-8
