= The Light We Carry =

Book by Michelle Obama

The Light We Carry: Overcoming in Uncertain Times
- Author: Michelle Obama
- Language: English
- Published: November 15, 2022
- Publisher: Crown (North America); Viking Press (Commonwealth)
- Publication place: United States
- Media type: Print
- Pages: 336
- ISBN: 978-0-5932-3746-5 (Hardcover)
- Preceded by: Becoming

The Light We Carry: Overcoming in Uncertain Times is a nonfiction book written by Michelle Obama and published on November 15, 2022, by Crown Publishing. According to the Associated Press, the author "shares the contents of her 'personal toolbox' - the habits and practices, attitudes and beliefs, and even physical objects that she uses to overcome her feelings of fear, helplessness and self-doubt." The Light We Carry has generally received positive reviews from book critics. In February 2023, it was announced that a podcast series by Obama based on topics in the book and the live book tour called Michelle Obama: The Light Podcast was released on March 7 by Audible. In January 2023, it was BBC Radio 4's Book of the Week read by Obama herself.

== Background ==
In 2018, Obama released her memoir Becoming which sold more than 14 million copies worldwide.

== Synopsis ==
The Light We Carry deals with uncertainty in the world such as the COVID-19 pandemic.

Obama describes times where she felt uncertain or out of place such as being a rare African American undergraduate at Princeton in the 1980s or becoming the first African American First Lady of the United States.
