= Michelle Obama =

First Lady of the United States from 2009 to 2017

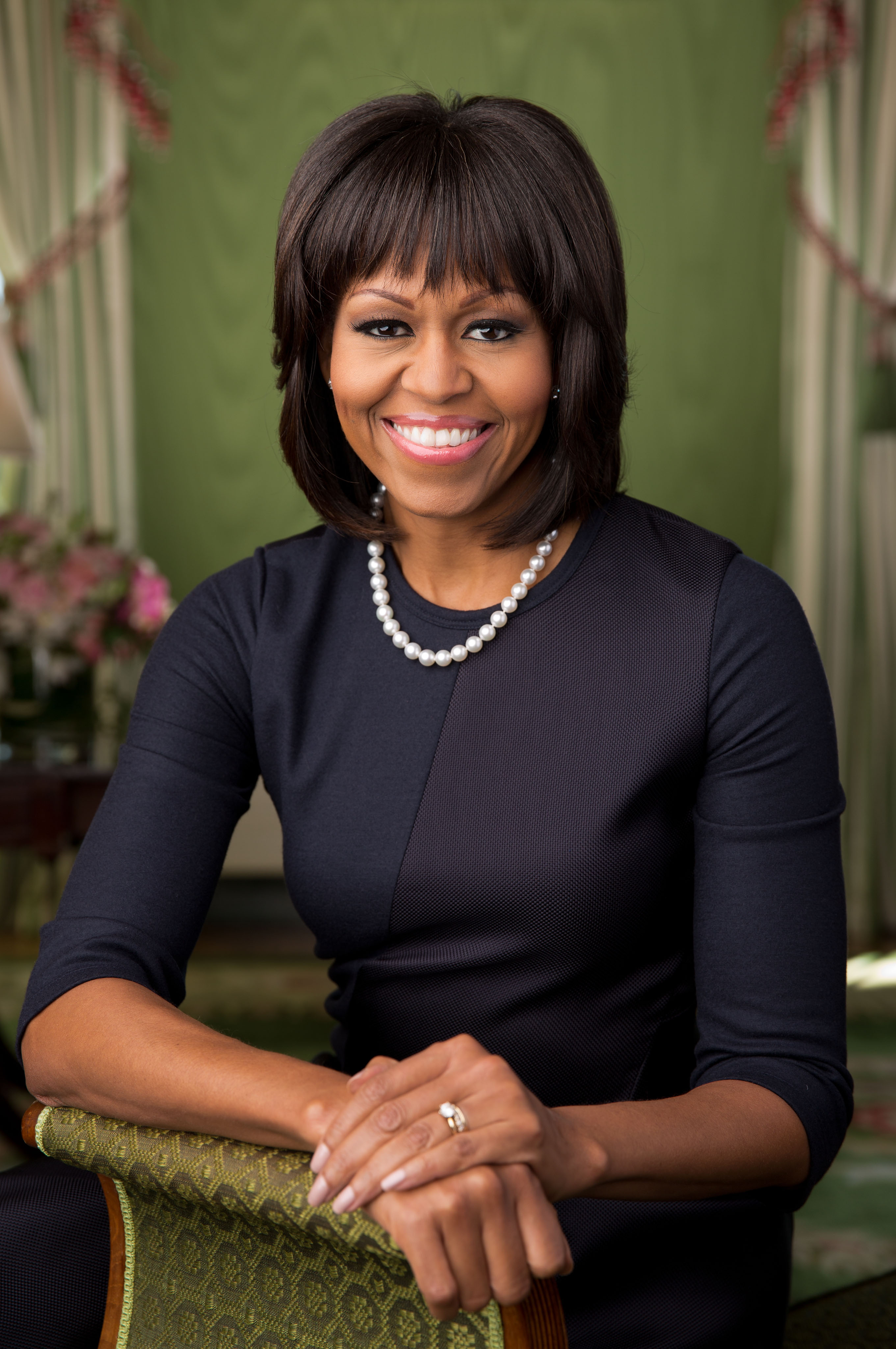
- Official portrait, 2013

First Lady of the United States
- In role January 20, 2009 – January 20, 2017
- President: Barack Obama
- Preceded by: Laura Bush
- Succeeded by: Melania Trump

Personal details
- Born: Michelle LaVaughn Robinson; January 17, 1964 (age 62) Chicago, Illinois, U.S.
- Party: Democratic
- Spouse: Barack Obama (m. 1992)
- Children: Malia; Sasha
- Parents: Fraser Robinson III; Marian Shields
- Relatives: Obama family (by marriage); Craig Robinson (brother)
- Education: Princeton University (BA); Harvard University (JD)
- Michelle Obama's voice Obama on the Soweto uprising and female leadership in Africa; Recorded June 23, 2011

Michelle LaVaughn Robinson Obama (née Robinson; born January 17, 1964) is an American attorney and author who served as First Lady of the United States from 2009 to 2017 as the wife of Barack Obama, the 44th president of the United States.

Born in Chicago and raised on the South Side of the city, Obama is a graduate of Princeton University and Harvard Law School. In her early legal career, she worked at the law firm Sidley Austin where she met her future husband. She subsequently worked in nonprofits and as the associate dean of student services at the University of Chicago. Later, she served as vice president for community and external affairs of the University of Chicago Medical Center. Michelle married Barack in 1992, and they have two daughters.

Obama campaigned for her husband's 2008 and 2012 presidential campaigns. She was the first African-American to serve as first lady. As first lady, Obama worked as an advocate for poverty awareness, education, nutrition, physical activity, and healthy eating. She has written four books, including her New York Times best-selling memoir Becoming (2018) and The Light We Carry (2022).

After leaving office, Obama ranked first in the Gallup poll for the most admired woman in the United States for three straight years. She holds significant cultural influence and continues to advocate for voter participation in elections. She has also pivoted to launching successful media ventures.

== Family and education ==
=== Early life and ancestry ===
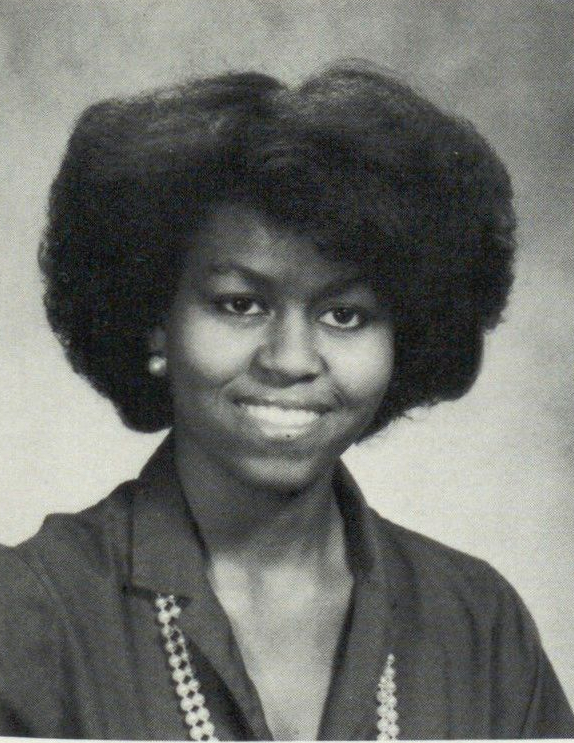
Robinson in the Princeton University yearbook in 1985

Michelle LaVaughn Robinson was born on January 17, 1964, in Chicago, Illinois, to Fraser Robinson III (1935–1991), a city water plant employee and Democratic precinct captain, and Marian Robinson (née Shields, 1937–2024), a secretary at Spiegel's catalog store. Her mother was a full-time homemaker until Michelle entered high school.

The Robinson and Shields families trace their roots to pre–Civil War African Americans in the American South. On her father's side, she is descended from the Gullah people of South Carolina's Lowcountry region. Her paternal great-great-grandfather, Jim Robinson, was born into slavery in 1850 on Friendfield Plantation, near Georgetown, South Carolina. He became a freedman at the age of 15 after the war. Some of Obama's paternal family still reside in the Georgetown area. Her grandfather, Fraser Robinson Jr., built his own house in South Carolina. He and his wife LaVaughn (née Johnson) returned to the Lowcountry from Chicago after retirement.

Among her maternal ancestors was her great-great-great-grandmother, Melvinia Dosey Shields, born into slavery in South Carolina but sold to Henry Walls Shields, who had a 200-acre (81 ha) farm in Clayton County, Georgia, near Atlanta. Melvinia's first son, Adolphus T. Shields, was biracial and born into slavery around 1860. Based on DNA and other evidence, in 2012, researchers said his father was likely 20-year-old Charles Marion Shields, son of Melvinia's master. They may have had a continuing relationship, as she had two more mixed-race children and lived near Shields after emancipation, taking his surname (she later changed her surname).

As was often the case, Melvinia did not talk to relatives about Dolphus's father. Dolphus Shields, with his wife Alice, moved to Birmingham, Alabama, after the Civil War. They were great-great-grandparents of Robinson, whose grandparents had moved to Chicago. Other of their children's lines migrated to Cleveland, Ohio, in the 20th century.

All four of Robinson's grandparents had multiracial ancestors, reflecting the complex history of the United States. Her extended family has said that people did not talk about the era of slavery when they were growing up. Her distant ancestry includes Irish, English, and Native American roots. Among her contemporary extended family is Rabbi Capers Funnye, her first cousin once removed. Funnye, born in Georgetown, South Carolina, and about 12 years older than Michelle, is the son of her paternal grandfather's sister and her husband; he converted to Judaism after college.

Robinson's childhood home was on the upper floor of 7436 South Euclid Avenue in Chicago's South Shore community area, which her parents rented from her great-aunt, who had the first floor. She was raised in what she describes as a "conventional" home, with "the mother at home, the father works, you have dinner around the table". Her elementary school was down the street. She and her family enjoyed playing games such as Monopoly, reading, and frequently saw extended family on both sides. She played piano, learning from her great-aunt, who was a piano teacher. The Robinsons attended services at nearby South Shore United Methodist Church. They used to vacation in a rustic cabin in White Cloud, Michigan. She and her 21-month-older brother, Craig, skipped the second grade.

Robinson's father suffered from multiple sclerosis, which had a profound effect on her. Subsequently, she was determined to stay out of trouble and perform well in school. By sixth grade, Michelle joined a gifted class at Bryn Mawr Elementary School (later renamed Bouchet Academy). She attended Whitney Young High School, Chicago's first magnet high school, established as a selective enrollment school, where she was a classmate of Jesse Jackson's daughter Santita. The round-trip commute from the Robinsons' South Side home to the Near West Side, where the school was located, took three hours. Michelle recalled being fearful of how others would perceive her, but disregarded any negativity around her and used it "to fuel me, to keep me going". She recalled facing gender discrimination growing up, saying, for example, that rather than asking her for her opinion on a given subject, people commonly tended to ask what her older brother thought. She was on the honor roll for four years, took Advanced Placement classes, was a member of the National Honor Society, and served as student council treasurer. She graduated in 1981 as the salutatorian of her class.

=== Education and early career ===
Robinson was inspired to follow her brother to Princeton University, where she matriculated in 1981. She majored in sociology and minored in African-American studies, graduating cum laude with a Bachelor of Arts in 1985 after completing a 99-page senior thesis under the supervision of Walter Wallace.

Robinson recalls that some of her teachers in high school tried to dissuade her from applying, and that she had been warned against "setting my sights too high". She believed her brother's status as a student in good standing (he graduated in 1983) might have helped her during the admission process, but she was resolved to demonstrate her own worth. She has said she was overwhelmed during her first year, attributing this to the fact that neither of her parents had graduated from college, and that she had never spent time on a college campus.

The mother of a white roommate reportedly tried to get her daughter reassigned because of Michelle's race. Robinson said being at Princeton was the first time she became more aware of her ethnicity and, despite the willingness of her classmates and teachers to reach out to her, she still felt "like a visitor on campus". There were also issues of economic class. "I remember being shocked," she says, "by college students who drove BMWs. I didn't even know parents who drove BMWs."

While at Princeton, Robinson became involved with the Third World Center (now known as the Carl A. Fields Center), an academic and cultural group which supported minority students. She ran their daycare center, which also offered after-school tutoring for older children. She challenged the teaching methodology for French because she felt it should be more conversational. As part of her requirements for graduation, she wrote a sociology thesis, entitled Princeton-Educated Blacks and the Black Community. She researched her thesis by sending a questionnaire to African-American graduates, asking that they specify when and how comfortable they were with their race prior to their enrollment at Princeton and how they felt about it when they were a student and since then. Of the 400 alumni to whom she sent the survey, fewer than 90 responded. Her findings did not support her hope that the black alumni would still identify with the African-American community, even though they had attended an elite university and had the advantages that accrue to its graduates.

Robinson pursued professional study, earning her Juris Doctor (J.D.) from Harvard Law School in 1988. By the time she applied to Harvard Law, biographer Bond wrote, her confidence had increased: "This time around, there was no doubt in her mind that she had earned her place". Her faculty mentor at Harvard Law was Charles Ogletree, who has said she had answered the question that had plagued her throughout Princeton by the time she arrived at Harvard Law: whether she would remain the product of her parents or keep the identity she had acquired at Princeton; she had concluded she could be "both brilliant and black".

At Harvard, Robinson participated in demonstrations advocating the hiring of professors who were members of minority groups. She worked for the Harvard Legal Aid Bureau, assisting low-income tenants with housing cases. She is the third first lady to have a postgraduate degree, after her two immediate predecessors, Hillary Clinton and Laura Bush. She later said her education gave her opportunities beyond what she had ever imagined.

=== Family life ===
Michelle's mother, Marian Robinson, was a stay-at-home mother. Her father was Fraser C. Robinson III, who worked at the city's water purification plant. Robinson's father, Fraser, died from complications from his illness in March 1991. She would later say that although he was the "hole in my heart" and "loss in my scar", the memory of her father has motivated her each day since. Her friend Suzanne Alele died from cancer around this time as well. These losses made her think of her contributions toward society and how well she was influencing the world from her law firm in her first job after law school. She considered this a turning point. Her mother died in May 2024, which Obama has said she takes part in therapy to help with.

Robinson met Barack Obama when they were among the few African Americans at their law firm, Sidley Austin LLP (she has sometimes said only two, although others have noted that there were others in different departments). She was assigned to mentor him while he was a summer associate. Their relationship started with a business lunch and then a community organization meeting where he first impressed her.

Before meeting Obama, Michelle had told her mother she intended to focus solely on her career. The couple's first date was to Spike Lee's movie Do the Right Thing (1989). Barack Obama has said the couple had an "opposites attract" scenario in their initial interest in each other since Michelle had stability from her two-parent home while he was "adventurous". They married on October 3, 1992. After suffering a miscarriage, Michelle underwent in vitro fertilization to conceive their daughters Malia Ann (born 1998) and Natasha (known as Sasha, born 2001).

The Obama family lived on Chicago's South Side, where Barack taught at the University of Chicago Law School. He was elected to the state senate in 1996 and to the U.S. Senate in 2004. They chose to keep their residence in Chicago after Barack's election rather than to move to Washington, DC, as they felt it was better for their daughters. Throughout her husband's 2008 campaign for U.S. president, Obama made a "commitment to be away overnight only once a week – to campaign only two days a week and be home by the end of the second day" for their two daughters.

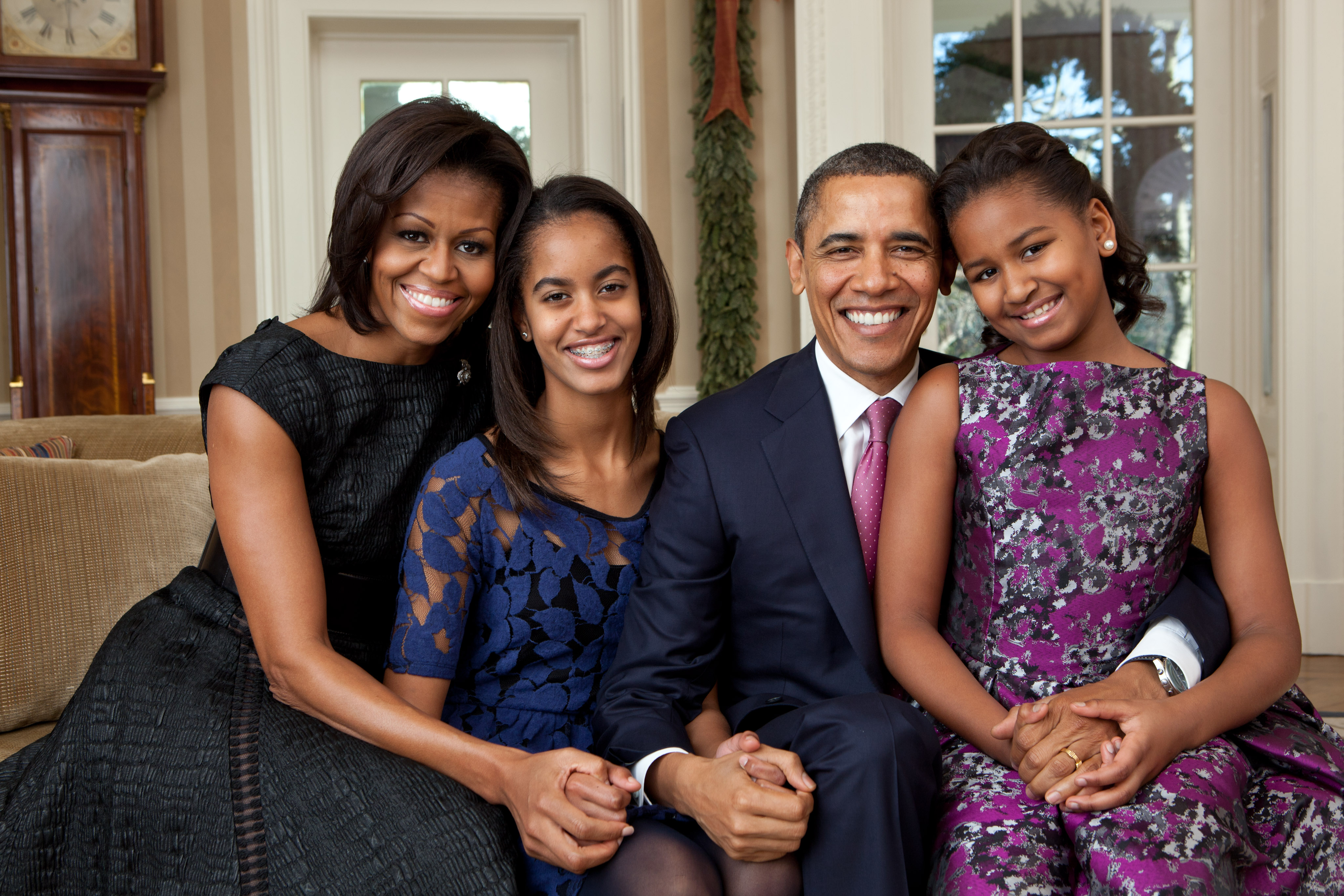
Official portrait by Pete Souza of the Obama family in the Oval Office on December 11, 2011

She once requested that her then-fiancé meet her prospective boss, Valerie Jarrett, when considering her first career move; Jarrett became one of her husband's closest advisors. The marital relationship has had its ebbs and flows; the combination of an evolving family life and beginning political career led to many arguments about balancing work and family. Barack Obama wrote in his second book, The Audacity of Hope: Thoughts on Reclaiming the American Dream, that "Tired and stressed, we had little time for conversation, much less romance." Despite their family obligations and careers, they continued to try to schedule "date nights" while they lived in Chicago.

The Obamas' daughters attended the University of Chicago Laboratory Schools, a private school. As a member of the school's board, Michelle fought to maintain diversity in the school when other board members connected with the University of Chicago tried to reserve more slots for children of the university faculty. This resulted in a plan to expand the school to increase enrollment. In Washington, DC, Malia and Sasha attended Sidwell Friends School, after also considering Georgetown Day School. In 2008, Michelle said in an interview on The Ellen DeGeneres Show that they did not intend to have any more children. The Obamas received advice from past first ladies Laura Bush, Rosalynn Carter, and Hillary Clinton about raising children in the White House. Marian Robinson, Michelle's mother, moved in to the White House to assist with child care.

=== Religion ===
Obama was raised United Methodist and joined the Trinity United Church of Christ, a mostly black congregation of the Reformed denomination known as the United Church of Christ. She and Barack Obama were married there by Rev. Jeremiah Wright. On May 31, 2008, Barack and Michelle Obama announced that they had withdrawn their membership in Trinity United Church of Christ saying: "Our relations with Trinity have been strained by the divisive statements of Reverend Wright, which sharply conflict with our own views."

The Obama family attended several different Protestant churches after moving to Washington D.C. in 2009, including Shiloh Baptist Church and St. John's Episcopal Church on Lafayette Square, known as the Presidents' Church. At the 49th African Methodist Episcopal Church's general conference, Michelle Obama encouraged the attendees to advocate for political awareness, saying, "To anyone who says that church is no place to talk about these issues, you tell them there is no place better – no place better, because ultimately, these are not just political issues – they are moral issues, they're issues that have to do with human dignity and human potential, and the future we want for our kids and our grandkids."

== Career ==
Following law school, Obama became an associate at the Chicago office of the law firm Sidley & Austin, where she met her future husband. At the firm, she worked on marketing and intellectual-property law. She continues to hold her law license, but as she no longer needs it for her work, she has kept it on a voluntary inactive status since 1993.

In 1991, she held public sector positions in the Chicago city government as an assistant to the mayor and as the assistant commissioner of planning and development. In 1993, she became executive director for the Chicago office of Public Allies, a non-profit organization encouraging young people to work on social issues in nonprofit groups and government agencies. She worked there nearly four years and set fundraising records for the organization that stood twelve years after she had left. Obama later said she had never been happier in her life prior to working "to build Public Allies".

In 1996, Obama served as the associate dean of student services at the University of Chicago, where she developed the university's Community Service Center. In 2002, she began working for the University of Chicago Hospitals, first as executive director for community affairs and, beginning May 2005, as vice president for community and external affairs.

She continued to hold the University of Chicago Hospitals position during the primary campaign of 2008 but cut back to part-time in order to spend time with her daughters as well as work for her husband's election. She subsequently took a leave of absence from her job.

According to the couple's 2006 income tax return, her salary was $273,618 from the University of Chicago Hospitals, while her husband had a salary of $157,082 from the United States Senate. The Obamas' total income was $991,296, which included $51,200 that she earned as a member of the board of directors of TreeHouse Foods and investments and royalties from his books.

Obama served as a salaried board member of TreeHouse Foods, Inc. (NYSE: THS), a major Wal-Mart supplier from shortly after her husband was seated in the Senate until she cut ties shortly after her husband announced his candidacy for the presidency; he criticized Wal-Mart labor policies at an AFL–CIO forum in Trenton, New Jersey, on May 14, 2007. She also served on the board of directors of the Chicago Council on Global Affairs.

In 2021, the former first lady announced that she had been "moving toward retirement". Though she continues to be active in political campaigns, the former first lady has said she is reducing the amount of work to spend more time with her husband.

== Barack Obama political campaigns ==
=== Early campaigns ===
During an interview in 1996, Michelle Obama acknowledged there was a "strong possibility" her husband would begin a political career, but said she was "wary" of the process. She knew it meant their lives would be subject to scrutiny and she was intensely private.

Although she campaigned on her husband's behalf since early in his political career by handshaking and fund-raising, she did not relish the activity at first. When she campaigned during her husband's 2000 run for United States House of Representatives, her boss at the University of Chicago asked if there was any single thing about campaigning that she enjoyed. After some thought, she replied that visiting so many living rooms had given her some new decorating ideas. Obama opposed her husband's run for the congressional seat, and, after his defeat, she preferred he tend to the financial needs of the family in what she deemed a more practical way.

=== 2008 presidential campaign ===
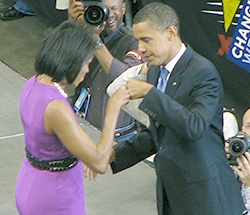
The Obamas fist bump upon his winning the Democratic nomination.

At first, Obama had reservations about her husband's presidential campaign, due to fears about a possible negative effect on their daughters. She says that she negotiated an agreement in which her husband was to quit smoking in exchange for her support of his decision to run. About her role in her husband's presidential campaign, she has said: "My job is not a senior advisor". During the campaign, she discussed race and education by using motherhood as a framework.

In May 2007, three months after her husband declared his presidential candidacy, Obama reduced her professional responsibilities by 80 percent to support his presidential campaign. Early in the campaign, she had limited involvement, traveling to political events only two days a week and rarely traveling overnight; by early February 2008, her participation had increased significantly. She attended thirty-three events in eight days. She made several campaign appearances with Oprah Winfrey. She wrote her own stump speeches for her husband's presidential campaign and generally spoke without notes.

During the campaign, columnist Cal Thomas on Fox News described Michelle Obama as an "Angry Black Woman" and some websites attempted to promote this image. Obama said: "Barack and I have been in the public eye for many years now, and we've developed a thick skin along the way. When you're out campaigning, there will always be criticism. I just take it in stride, and at the end of the day, I know that it comes with the territory."

By the time of the 2008 Democratic National Convention in August, media outlets observed that her presence on the campaign trail had grown softer than at the start of the race, focusing on soliciting concerns and empathizing with the audience rather than throwing down challenges to them, and giving interviews to shows such as The View and publications like Ladies' Home Journal rather than appearing on news programs. The change was reflected in her fashion choices, as she wore clothes that were more informal clothes than her earlier designer pieces. Partly intended to help soften her public image, her appearance on The View was widely covered in the press.

The presidential campaign was Obama's first exposure to the national political scene; she was considered the least famous of the candidates' spouses. Early in the campaign, she told anecdotes about Obama family life; however, as the press began to emphasize her sarcasm, she toned it down.

New York Times op-ed columnist Maureen Dowd wrote:

I wince a bit when Michelle Obama chides her husband as a mere mortal – a comic routine that rests on the presumption that we see him as a god ... But it may not be smart politics to mock him in a way that turns him from the glam JFK into the mundane Gerald Ford, toasting his own English muffin. If all Senator Obama is peddling is the Camelot mystique, why debunk this mystique?

On the first night of the 2008 Democratic National Convention, Craig Robinson introduced his younger sister. She delivered her speech, during which she sought to portray herself and her family as the embodiment of the American Dream. Obama said she and her husband believe "that you work hard for what you want in life, that your word is your bond, and you do what you say you're going to do, that you treat people with dignity and respect, even if you don't know them, and even if you don't agree with them." She also emphasized loving her country, likely responding to criticism for having said that she felt "proud of her country for the first time". The first statement was seen as a gaffe. Her keynote address was largely well-received and drew mostly positive reviews. A Rasmussen Reports poll found that her favorability among Americans reached 55%, the highest for her.

On an October 6, 2008, broadcast, Larry King asked Obama if the American electorate was past the Bradley effect. She said her husband's winning the nomination was a fairly strong indicator that it was. The same night she was interviewed by Jon Stewart on The Daily Show, where she deflected criticism of her husband and his campaign. On Fox News' America's Pulse, E. D. Hill referred to the fist bump shared by the Obamas the night he clinched the Democratic presidential nomination, describing it as a "terrorist fist jab". Hill was taken off air, and the show was canceled.

=== 2012 presidential re-election campaign ===
Obama campaigned for her husband's re-election in 2012. Beginning in 2011, Obama became more politically active than she had been since the 2008 election, though avoided discussions about the re-election bid. By the time of the election cycle, she had developed a more open public image. Some commentators viewed her as the most popular member of the Obama administration, noting that her poll approval numbers had not dropped below 60% since she entered the White House. An Obama senior campaign official said she was "the most popular political figure in America".

Obama was considered a polarizing figure, having aroused both "sharp enmity and deep loyalty" from Americans, but she was also seen as having improved her image since 2008 when her husband first ran for the presidency. Isabel Wilkinson of The Daily Beast said Obama's fashion style changed over the course of the campaign to be sensitive and economical.

Prior to the first debate of the election cycle, Obama expressed confidence in her husband's debating skills. He was later criticized for appearing detached and for looking down when addressing Romney. Consensus among uncommitted voters was that the latter had won the debate. After Obama's speech at the 2012 Democratic National Convention, the first lady was found through a CBS News/New York Times poll conducted in September to have a 61% favorably rating with registered voters, the highest percentage she had polled since April 2009.

Obama aimed to humanize her husband by relating stories about him, attempting to appeal to female voters in swing states. Paul Harris of The Guardian said the same tactic was being used by Ann Romney, wife of 2012 Republican candidate Mitt Romney. Polls in October showed their husbands tied at 47% for the female vote. However, Michelle Obama's favorability ratings remained higher than Ann Romney's at 69% to 52%. Despite Obama's higher poll numbers, comparisons between Obama and Romney were repeatedly made by the media until the election. But, as Michelle Cottle of Newsweek wrote, "... nobody votes for first lady."

== First Lady of the United States (2009–2017) ==
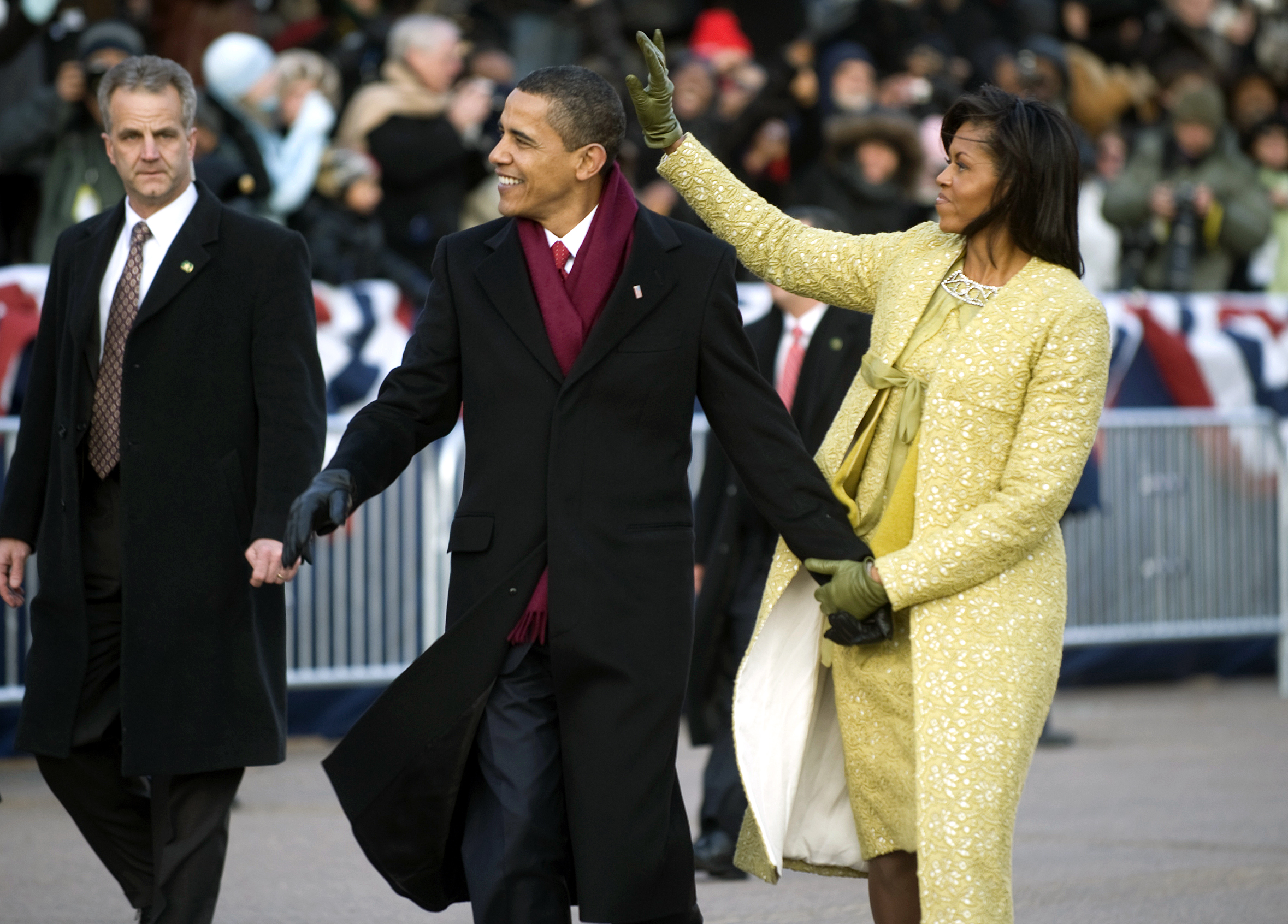
Obama wore Isabel Toledo clothes made of St. Gallen Embroidery to the 2009 presidential inauguration.

During her early months as First Lady, Obama visited homeless shelters and soup kitchens. She also sent representatives to schools and advocated public service.

Obama advocated for her husband's policy priorities by promoting bills that support it. She hosted a White House reception for women's rights advocates in celebration of the enactment of the Lilly Ledbetter Fair Pay Act of 2009 Pay equity law. She supported the economic stimulus bill in visits to the United States Department of Housing and Urban Development and United States Department of Education. Some observers looked favorably upon her legislative activities, while others said she should be less involved in politics. According to her representatives, she intended to visit all United States Cabinet-level agencies in order to get acquainted with Washington.

On June 5, 2009, the White House announced that Michelle Obama was replacing her then chief of staff, Jackie Norris, with Susan Sher, a longtime friend and adviser. Norris became a senior adviser to the Corporation for National and Community Service.

In 2009, Obama was named Barbara Walters's Most Fascinating Person of the year. In her memoir, Becoming, Obama describes her four primary initiatives as first lady: Let's Move!, Reach Higher, Let Girls Learn, and Joining Forces. Some initiatives of First Lady Michelle Obama included advocating on behalf of military families, helping working women balance career and family, encouraging national service, and promoting the arts and arts education. Obama made supporting military families and spouses a personal mission and increasingly bonded with military families. According to her aides, stories of the sacrifice these families make moved her to tears. In April 2012, Obama and her husband were awarded the Jerald Washington Memorial Founders' Award by the National Coalition for Homeless Veterans (NCHV). The award is the highest honor given to homeless veteran advocates. Obama was again honored with the award in May 2015, accepting with Jill Biden.

In November 2013, a Politico article by Michelle Cottle accusing Obama of being a "feminist nightmare" for not using her position and education to advocate for women's issues was sharply criticized across the political spectrum. Cottle quoted Linda Hirshman saying of Obama's trendy styles, promotion of gardening and healthy eating, and support of military families that "She essentially became the English lady of the manor, Tory Party, circa 1830s." A prominent critic of Cottle was MSNBC host Melissa Harris-Perry, who rhetorically asked "Are you serious?" Supporters of Obama note that the first lady had been one of the only people in the administration to address obesity, through promoting good eating habits, which is one of the leading U.S. public health crises.

In May 2014, Obama joined the campaign to bring back school girls who had been kidnapped in Nigeria. The first lady tweeted a picture of herself holding a poster with the #bringbackourgirls campaign hashtag. Obama writes in her book about enlisting help for her initiative Let Girls Learn to produce and sing the song "This is for My Girls".

Over the course of the Obama presidency, particularly during the second term, Michelle Obama was subject to speculation over whether she would run for the presidency herself, similarly to predecessor Hillary Clinton. A May 2015 Rasmussen poll found Obama had 22% of support to Clinton's 56% of winning the Democratic nomination, higher than that of potential candidates Elizabeth Warren, Martin O'Malley, and Bernie Sanders. Another poll that month found that 71% of Americans believed Obama should not run for the presidency, only 14% approving. On January 14, 2016, during a town-hall meeting, President Obama was asked if the first lady could be talked into running. He responded, "There are three things that are certain in life: death, taxes, and Michelle is not running for president. That I can tell you." On March 16, 2016, while speaking in Austin, Texas, Obama denied that she would ever run for the office, citing a desire to "impact as many people as possible in an unbiased way". In the epilogue to Becoming, Obama writes, "I have no intention of running for office, ever," recognizing that "politics can be a means for positive change, but this arena is just not for me."

=== Let's Move! ===
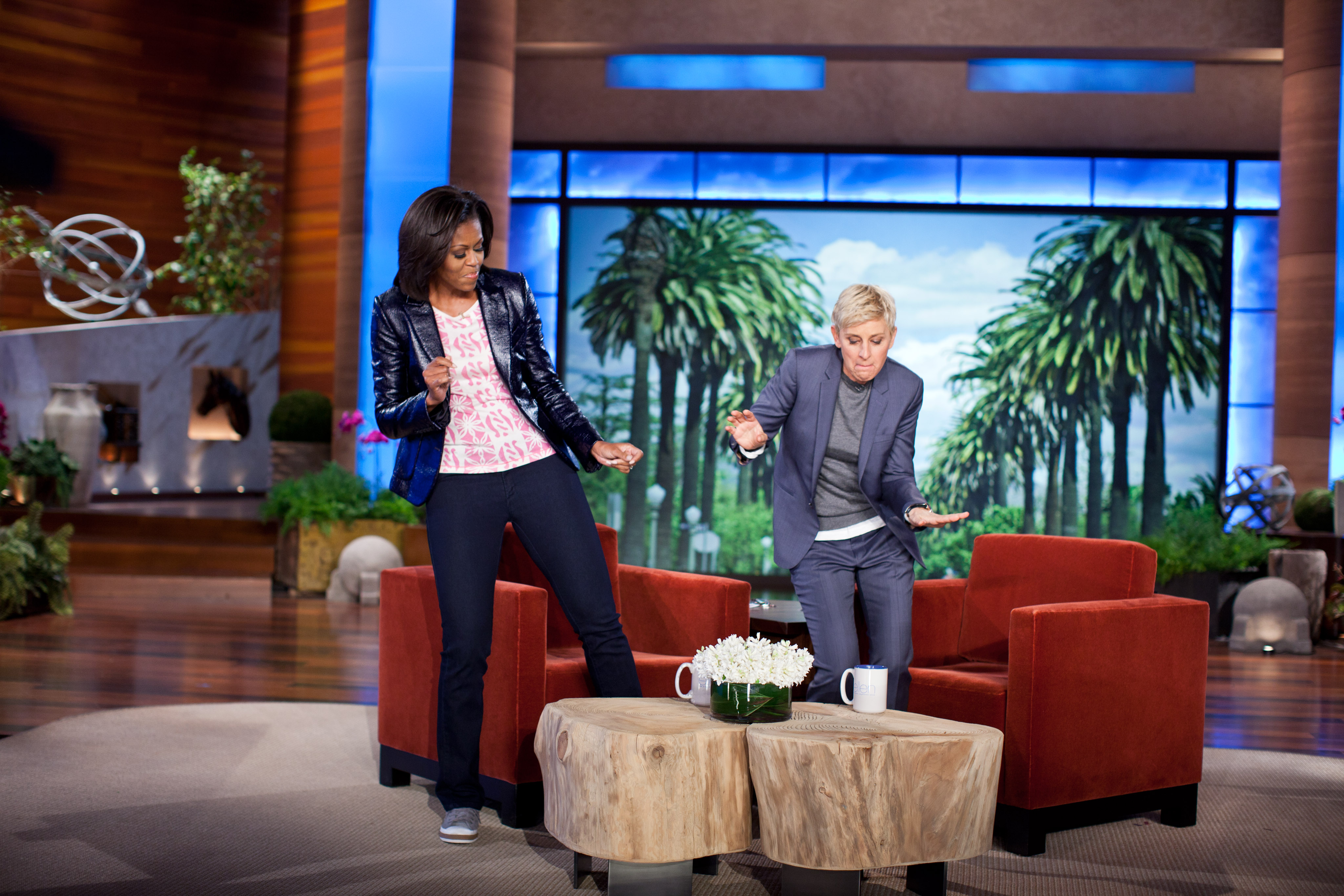
Obama and Ellen DeGeneres dance on the second anniversary of Let's Move!

Obama's predecessors Hillary Clinton and Laura Bush supported the organic movement by instructing the White House kitchens to buy organic food. Obama extended their support of healthy eating by planting the White House Kitchen Garden, an organic garden, the first White House vegetable garden since Eleanor Roosevelt served as First Lady. She also had bee hives installed on the South Lawn of the White House. The garden supplied organic produce and honey for the meals of the First Family and for state dinners and other official gatherings.

In January 2010, Obama undertook her first lead role in an administration-wide initiative, which she named "Let's Move!", to make progress in reversing the 21st-century trend of childhood obesity. On February 9, 2010, the first lady announced Let's Move! and President Barack Obama created the Task Force on Childhood Obesity to review all current programs and create a national plan for change.

Michelle Obama said her goal was to make this effort her legacy: "I want to leave something behind that we can say, 'Because of this time that this person spent here, this thing has changed.' And my hope is that that's going to be in the area of childhood obesity." Her 2012 book American Grown: The Story of the White House Kitchen Garden and Gardens Across America is based on her experiences with the garden and promotes healthy eating. Her call for action on healthy eating was repeated by the United States Department of Defense, which has been facing an ever-expanding problem of obesity among recruits.

Several Republicans have critiqued or lampooned Obama's initiative. In October 2014, senator Rand Paul linked to Michelle Obama's Twitter account when announcing on the website that he was going to Dunkin' Donuts. In January 2016, Chris Christie, Republican governor of New Jersey and presidential candidate, criticized the first lady's involvement with healthy eating while he was campaigning in Iowa, arguing that she was using the government to exercise her views on eating. Obama had previously cited Christie as an example of an adult who struggled with obesity, a demographic that she sought to diminish by targeting children since Let's Move! was "working with kids when they're young, so that they don't have these direct challenges when they get older." In February, Senator Ted Cruz said that he would end Obama's health policies and return french fries to school cafeterias if his wife were first lady.

=== LGBT rights ===
In the 2008 U.S. presidential campaign, Obama boasted to gay Democratic groups of her husband's record on LGBT rights: his support of the Illinois Human Rights Act, the Illinois gender violence act, the Employment Non-Discrimination Act, repealing the "Don't Ask Don't Tell" policy, and full repeal of the Defense of Marriage Act, civil unions; along with hate crimes protection for sexual orientation and gender identity and renewed effort to fight HIV and AIDS. They have both opposed amendments proposed to ban same-sex marriage in the federal, California, and Florida constitutions. She said that the U.S. Supreme Court delivered justice in the Lawrence v. Texas case, and she drew a connection between the struggles for gay rights and civil rights by saying, "We are all only here because of those who marched and bled and died, from Selma to Stonewall, in the pursuit of a more perfect union."

After the repeal of Don't Ask Don't Tell on September 20, 2011, Obama included openly gay service members in her national military families initiative. On May 9, 2012, Barack and Michelle Obama came out publicly in favor of same-sex marriage. Prior to this, Michelle Obama had never publicly stated her position on this issue. Senior White House officials said Michelle Obama and Senior Adviser Valerie Jarrett had been the two most consistent advocates for same-sex marriage in Barack Obama's life. Michelle said:

This is an important issue for millions of Americans, and for Barack and me, it really comes down to the values of fairness and equality we want to pass down to our girls. These are basic values that kids learn at a very young age and that we encourage them to apply in all areas of their lives. And in a country where we teach our children that everyone is equal under the law, discriminating against same-sex couples just isn't right. It's as simple as that.

At the 2012 DNC, Michelle said, "Barack knows the American Dream because he's lived it ... and he wants everyone in this country to have that same opportunity, no matter who we are, or where we're from, or what we look like, or who we love."

=== Domestic travels ===
In May 2009, Obama delivered the commencement speech at a graduating ceremony at UC Merced in Merced County, California, the address being praised afterward by students who found her relatable. Kevin Fagan of the San Francisco Chronicle wrote that there was chemistry between Obama and the students.

In August 2013, Obama attended the 50th anniversary ceremony for the March on Washington at the Lincoln Memorial. Positive attention was brought to Obama's attire, a black sleeveless dress with red flowers, designed by Tracy Reese. Reese reacted by releasing a public statement that she was honored the first lady "would choose to wear one of our designs during the celebration of such a deeply significant historical moment".

In March 2015, Obama traveled to Selma, Alabama, with her family to commemorate the fiftieth anniversary of the Selma to Montgomery marches. After President Obama's remarks there, the Obamas joined original marchers, including John Lewis, in crossing the Edmund Pettus Bridge.

In July 2015, Obama journeyed to Coachella Valley while coming to Los Angeles for that year's Special Olympics World Games.

In October 2015, Obama was joined by Jill Biden and Prince Harry in visiting a military base in Fort Belvoir, Virginia, in an attempt on the prince's part to raise awareness to programs supporting harmed service members. In December 2015, Obama traveled with her husband to San Bernardino, California, to meet with families of the victims of a terrorist attack that occurred two weeks earlier.

=== Foreign trips ===
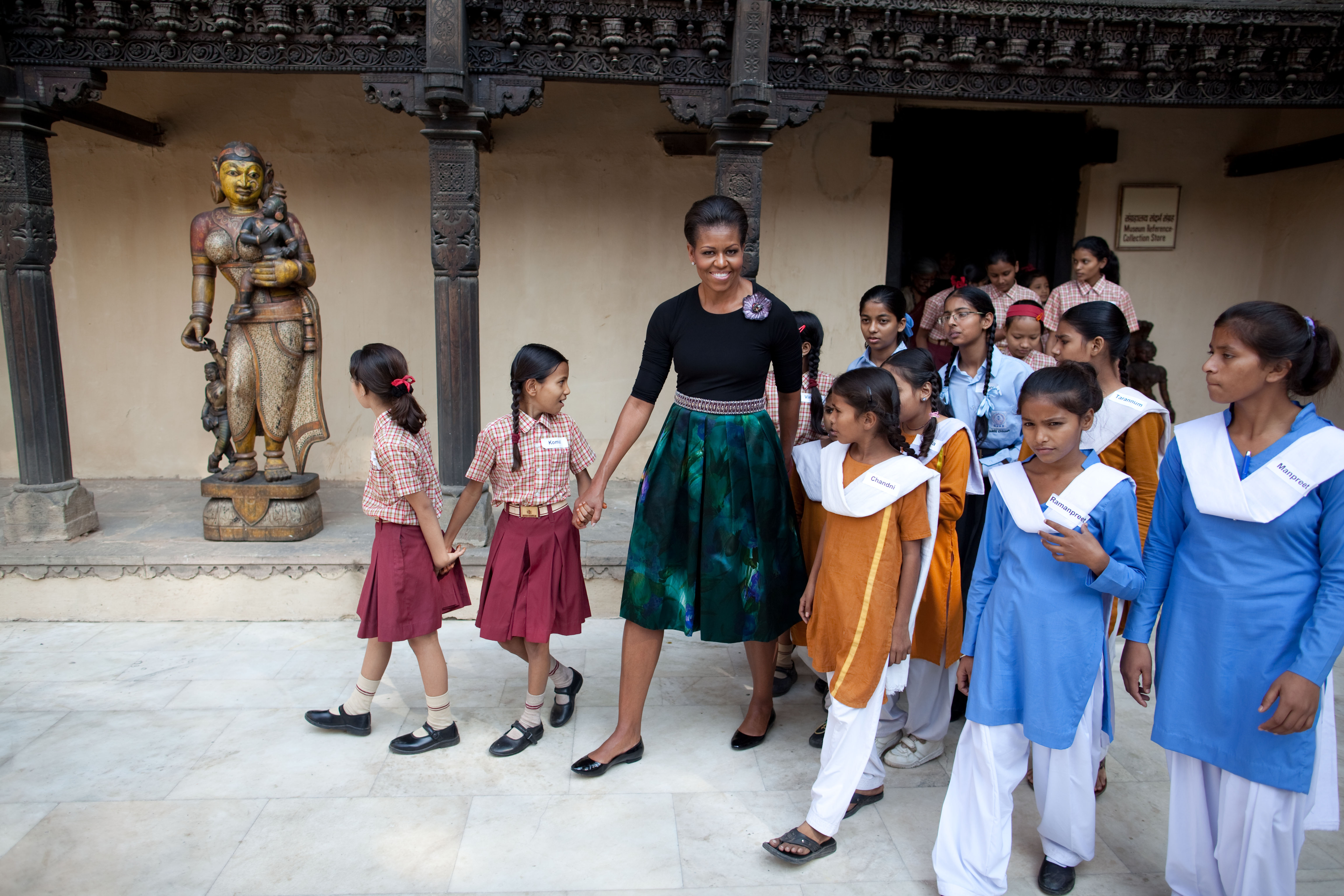
Obama with children in Delhi, November 8, 2010

On April 1, 2009, Obama met with Queen Elizabeth II in Buckingham Palace. Obama embraced her before attending an event with world leaders. Obama praised her, though the hug generated controversy for being out of protocol when greeting Elizabeth.

In April 2010, Obama traveled to Mexico, her first solo visit to a nation. In Mexico, Obama spoke to students, encouraging them to take responsibility for their futures. Referring to the underprivileged children, Obama argued that "potential can be found in some of the most unlikely places," citing herself and her husband as examples.

Obama traveled to Africa for the second official trip in June 2011, touring Johannesburg, Cape Town and Botswana and meeting with Graça Machel. Obama was also involved with community events in the foreign countries. It was commented by White House staff that her trip to Africa would advance the foreign policy of her husband.

In March 2014, Obama visited China along with her two daughters Malia and Sasha, and her mother Marian Robinson. She met with Peng Liyuan, the wife of Chinese leader Xi Jinping, visited historic and cultural sites, as well as a university and two high schools. Deputy National Security Adviser Ben Rhodes said the visit and intent in Obama journeying there was to symbolize "the relationship between the United States and China is not just between leaders, it's a relationship between peoples."

In January 2015, Obama traveled to Saudi Arabia alongside her husband, following the death of King Abdullah. She received criticism for not covering her head in a nation where women are forbidden from publicly not doing so, though Obama was defended for being a foreigner and thus not having to submit to Saudi Arabia's customs, even being praised in some corners. Obama was neither greeted nor acknowledged by King Salman during the encounter.

In June 2015, Obama undertook a weeklong trip to London and three Italian cities. In London, she spoke with students about international education for adolescent girls and met with both British prime minister David Cameron and Prince Harry. She was joined by her two daughters and mother. In November, she spent a week in Qatar, her first official visit to the Middle East. She continued advancing her initiative for international education for women by speaking at the 2015 World Innovation Summit for Education for her "Let Girls Learn" initiative in Doha, Qatar, and touring a school in Amman, Jordan, where she met with female students. During the Qatar trip, Obama had intended to visit Jordan as well, but the trip was canceled due to weather conditions. In Jordan, Obama had intended to visit an Amman school that had been constructed with assistance from U.S. funds.

In March 2016, Obama accompanied her husband and children to Cuba in a trip that was seen by the administration as having the possibility of positively impacting relations between the country and America. Later that month, the first couple and their daughters traveled to Argentina, meeting with Argentine president Mauricio Macri.

=== Midterm elections ===
Obama campaigned for Democratic candidates in the 2010 midterm elections, making her debut on the campaign trail in Milwaukee, Wisconsin. By the time she began campaigning, Obama's approval rating was 20 percentage points higher than her husband's. Though Obama indicated in January 2010 that a consensus had not been made about whether she would campaign, speculation of her involvement came from her large approval rating as well as reports that she had been invited to speak at events with Democrats such as Barbara Boxer, Mary Jo Kilroy and Joe Sestak. She toured seven states in two weeks within October 2010. Aides reported that, though viewed as essential by the White House, she would not become deeply involved with political discussions nor engage Republicans in public disputes. After the elections, only six of the thirteen Democratic candidates Obama had campaigned for won. The Los Angeles Times concluded that while Obama was indeed more popular than her husband, her "election scorecard proved no better than his, particularly in her home state".

Obama was a participant in the 2014 midterm elections, held at a time when her popularity superseded her husband's to such an extent that it was theorized she would receive a much larger outpour of support in campaigning. Reporting her travel to Denver, Colorado, David Lightman wrote that while Democrats did not want President Obama to campaign for them, "the first lady is very popular." In May 2014, Obama was found to have a 61% favorable approval rating from a CNN poll, her husband coming in at 43%. In a video released in July, as part of an effort to encourage voter turnout, she called on voters to be "hungry as you were back in 2008 and 2012". Obama appeared at a fundraiser in Georgia in September for Democratic senate candidate Michelle Nunn. Obama's approach to campaigning in Georgia strayed from discussing current events and instead broadly stressed the importance of registering to vote and turning out during the elections. Obama's infrequent appearances came from her dislike of being away from her children and Washington politics as well as her distaste for the opposition by Republicans to her husband's agenda and her view that Democrats in the U.S. Senate had not sufficiently been supporters of her initiatives to end childhood obesity. Obama raised her profile in October, touring three states in four days. Obama called the elections her husband's "last campaign".

=== Hillary Clinton 2016 presidential campaign ===
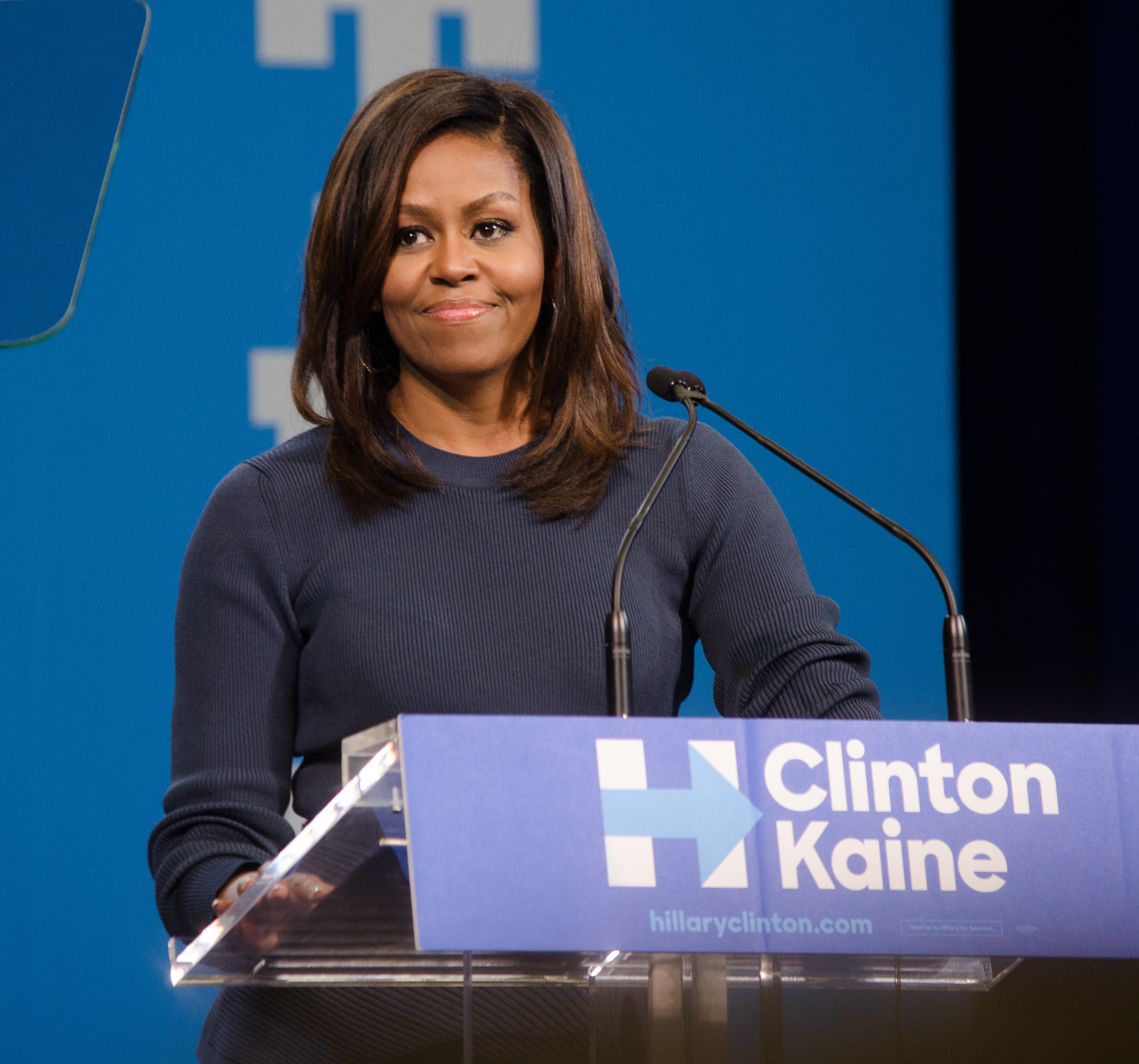
Obama speaks at a Hillary Clinton presidential campaign rally at Southern New Hampshire University on October 13, 2016.

Obama endorsed Democratic nominee Hillary Clinton and made several high-profile speeches in favor of her, including an address at the 2016 Democratic National Convention in Philadelphia. She also appeared multiple times on the campaign trail in either solo or joint appearances with Clinton. On October 13, 2016, while speaking at a Clinton rally in Manchester, New Hampshire, Obama strongly criticized Republican presidential nominee Donald Trump for remarks he had made in the 2005 Access Hollywood recording with Billy Bush. A week later, Trump attempted to revive past comments Obama made in regard to Clinton during the 2008 presidential election.

=== Public image and style ===
With the ascent of her husband as a prominent national politician, Obama became a part of popular culture. In May 2006, Essence listed her among "25 of the World's Most Inspiring Women". In July 2007, Vanity Fair listed her among "10 of the World's Best Dressed People". She was an honorary guest at Oprah Winfrey's Legends Ball as a "young'un" paying tribute to the "Legends" who helped pave the way for African-American women. In September 2007, 02138 magazine listed her 58th of "The Harvard 100"; a list of the prior year's most influential Harvard alumni. Her husband was ranked fourth. In July 2008, she made a repeat appearance on the Vanity Fair international best dressed list. She also appeared on the 2008 People list of best-dressed women and was praised by the magazine for her "classic and confident" look.

At the time of her husband's election, some sources anticipated that as a high-profile African-American woman in a stable marriage Obama would be a positive role model who would influence the view the world has of African Americans. Her fashion choices were part of the 2009 Fashion week, but Obama's influence in the field did not have the impact on the paucity of African-American models who participate, that some thought it might.

Obama's public support grew in her early months as First Lady, as she was accepted as a role model. On her first trip abroad in April 2009, she toured a cancer ward with Sarah Brown, wife of British prime minister Gordon Brown. Newsweek described her first trip abroad as an exhibition of her "star power", and MSN described it as a display of sartorial elegance. Questions were raised by some in the American and British media regarding protocol when the Obamas met Queen Elizabeth II and Michelle reciprocated a touch on her back by the Queen during a reception, purportedly against traditional royal etiquette. Palace sources denied that any breach in etiquette had occurred.

Obama has been compared to Jacqueline Kennedy due to her sense of style and also to Barbara Bush for her discipline and decorum. Obama's style has been described as "fashion populist". In 2010, she wore clothes, many high end, from more than fifty design companies with less expensive pieces from J.Crew and Target, and the same year a study found that her patronage was worth an average of $14 million to a company. She became a fashion trendsetter, in particular favoring sleeveless dresses, including her first-term official portrait in a dress by Michael Kors and her ball gowns designed by Jason Wu for both inaugurals. She has also been known for wearing clothes by African designers such as Mimi Plange, Duro Olowu, Maki Oh, and Osei Duro, and styles such as the Adire fabric.

Obama appeared on the cover and in a photo spread in the March 2009 issue of Vogue. Every first lady since Lou Hoover (except Bess Truman) has been in Vogue, but only Hillary Clinton had previously appeared on the cover. Obama later appeared two more times on the cover of Vogue, while First Lady, the last time in December 2016, with photographs by Annie Leibovitz. In August 2011, she became the first woman ever to appear on the cover of Better Homes and Gardens magazine, and the first person in 48 years. In 2013, during the 85th Academy Awards, she became the first first lady to announce the winner of an Oscar (Best Picture, which went to Argo).

The media have been criticized for focusing more on the first lady's fashion sense than her serious contributions. She said after the 2008 election that she would like to focus attention as First Lady on issues of concern to military and working families. In 2008, U.S. News & World Report blogger, PBS host and Scripps Howard columnist Bonnie Erbé argued that Obama's own publicists seemed to be feeding the emphasis on style over substance, and said Obama was miscasting herself by overemphasizing style.

For three straight years – 2018, 2019, and 2020 – Obama topped the Gallup poll asking who is the "most admired woman" in the U.S.

Time magazine features an annual "Person of the Year" cover story in which Time recognizes the individual or group of individuals who have had the biggest impact on news headlines over the previous twelve months. In 2020, the magazine decided to retroactively choose a historically deserving woman for each year in which a man had been named Person of the Year, reflecting the fact that a woman or women had been named Person of the Year only eleven times in the preceding hundred. As part of this review, Michelle Obama was named the Woman of the Year for 2008.

=== Assessment by historians and scholars ===
Since 1982 Siena College Research Institute has conducted occasional surveys asking historians and scholars to assess American first ladies according to a cumulative score on the independent criteria of their background, value to the country, intelligence, courage, accomplishments, integrity, leadership, being their own women, public image, and value to the president. Obama was ranked 5th-best out of 39 in the 2014 survey (conducted during her husband's second term as president) and 3rd-best out of 40 in 2020 (the first survey conducted after the Obamas had left the White House).

== Subsequent activities (2017–present) ==
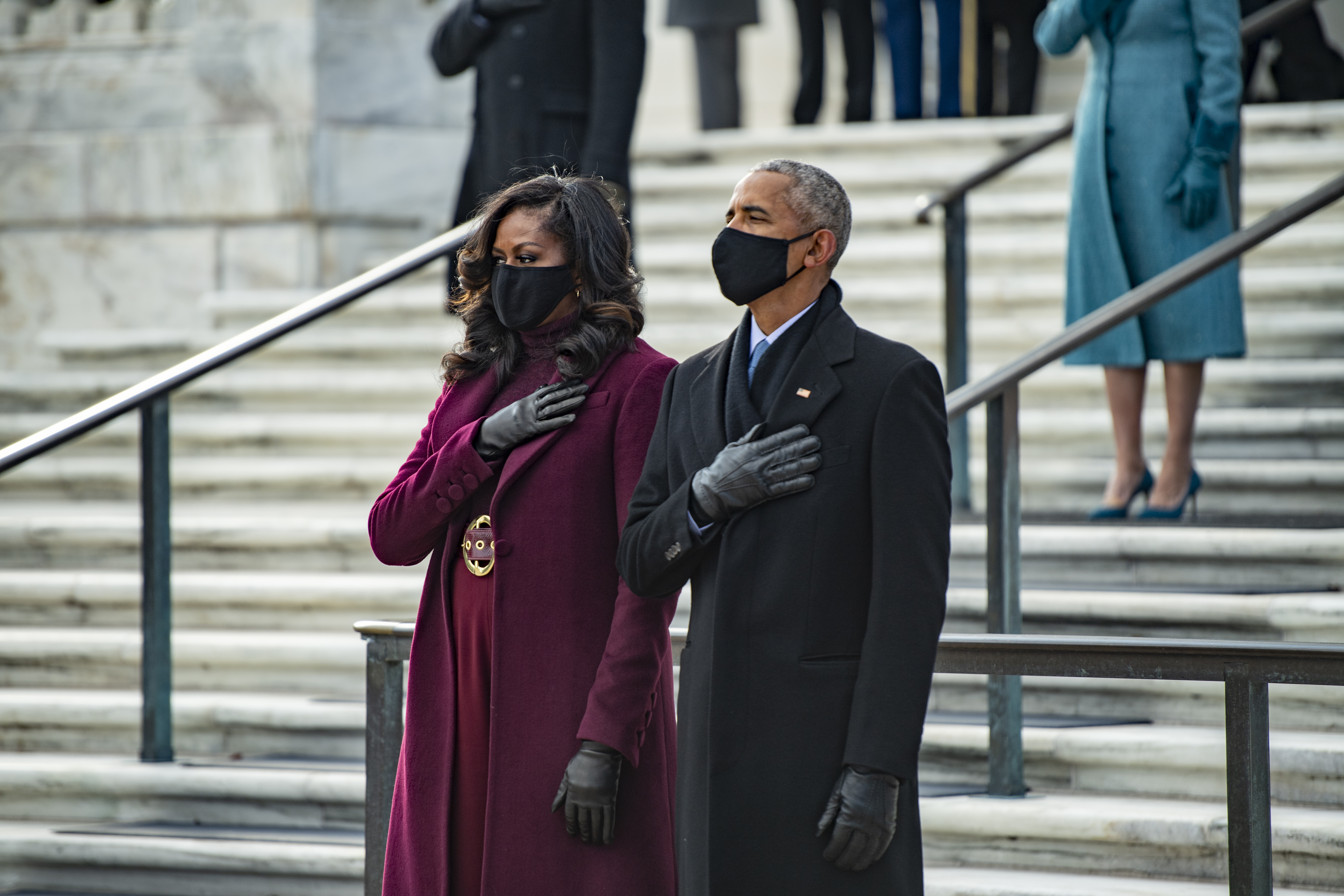
Obama attending a wreath laying ceremony with her husband at the Tomb of the Unknown Soldier in Arlington National Cemetery after the inauguration of Joe Biden in 2021

In May 2017, during an appearance at the Partnership for a Healthier America conference, Obama rebuked the Trump administration for its delay of a federal requirement designed to increase the nutritional standards for school lunches. In June, while attending the WWDC in Silicon Valley, California, Obama called for tech companies to add women for the diversifying of their ranks. In July, Obama honored Eunice Shriver at the 2017 ESPY Awards. In September, Obama delivered an address at the tech conference in Utah charging the Trump administration with having a fearful White House, appeared in a video for the Global Citizens Festival advocating more attention to giving young girls an education, and attended the Inbound 2017 conference in Boston. During an October 3 appearance at the Philadelphia Conference for Women, Obama cited a lack of diversity in politics with contributing to lawmakers being distrusted by other groups. In November, Obama discussed gender disparity in attitudes with Elizabeth Alexander while attending the Obama Foundation Summit in Chicago, and spoke at the Bushnell Center for the Performing Arts in Hartford, Connecticut.

In April 2018, Obama responded to speculation that she might be running for president by saying she has "never had the passion for politics" and that "there are millions of women who are inclined and do have the passion for politics."

On January 2, 2021, Obama encouraged Georgia residents to vote in the state's runoff in the U.S. Senate election and to contact VoteRiders, a non-profit voter ID education organization, to make sure they have the necessary ID to vote.

On January 20, 2021, Obama and her husband attended the inauguration of Joe Biden. Michelle Obama wore a matching plum coat, sweater, pants, and belt designed by Sergio Hudson to the inauguration.

In 2021, she was inducted into the National Women's Hall of Fame. On September 11, 2021, the Obamas attended a 9/11 memorial to commemorate the 20th anniversary of the attacks.

On April 28, 2023, Obama, along with actress Kate Capshaw, joined Bruce Springsteen on stage during his show in Barcelona where they provided backing vocals and tambourine on Springsteen's song "Glory Days".

=== 2024 U.S. presidential election ===
Amid media speculation over the candidacy of President Biden, Obama's office announced in March 2024 that she would not be running for president in the 2024 United States presidential election.

According to a Reuters/Ipsos public opinion poll among 892 registered voters released on July 2, 2024, Michelle Obama was the only listed Democrat option who would defeat Trump in a confrontation, with 50% of the votes for Obama versus 39% for Trump. 55% of the voters also had a favourable view of Obama versus 42% toward Trump.

On August 20, 2024, Obama gave the penultimate address on the second night of the 2024 Democratic National Convention and then introduced the final speaker, her husband, former president Barack Obama. The New York Times called her speech "electrifying" and suggested she had outshone her husband.

=== Books ===
Obama wrote American Grown (American Grown: The Story of the White House Kitchen Garden and Gardens Across America), published on May 29, 2012, to promote healthy eating.

Obama's memoir, Becoming, was released in November 2018. By November 2019, it had sold 11.5 million copies. She received the Grammy Award for Best Audio Book, Narration & Storytelling Recording in 2020.

Obama's second book, The Light We Carry: Overcoming in Uncertain Times, was published in November 2022. The book was published by Penguin Random House. Her third book, The Look, on the evolution of her personal style, was published in November 2025.

=== Podcasts ===
In July 2020, she premiered a podcast titled The Michelle Obama Podcast. It was followed in 2023 by Michelle Obama: The Light Podcast based on topics in her 2022 book The Light We Carry and featured conversations held during her live book tour. In March 2025, she launched the podcast IMO with her brother Craig Robinson.

=== Film and television ===
Obama has made occasional guest appearances on TV shows, often portraying herself: iCarly in 2012, Parks and Recreation in 2014, NCIS in 2016, and Black-ish in 2022. She received a Black Reel Awards for Television nomination for Outstanding Guest Actress, Comedy Series for her role in Black-ish.

A documentary titled Becoming, which chronicles Obama's book tour promoting her memoir, was released on Netflix on May 6, 2020.

In February 2021, Obama was announced as an executive producer and presenter on a children's cooking show, Waffles + Mochi. It was released by Netflix on March 16, 2021. More recently, Regina Hicks signed a deal with Netflix alongside her and Barack's Higher Ground production company to develop comedies. She received two Children's and Family Emmy Awards at the 1st Children's and Family Emmy Awards: for Outstanding Short Form Program (We the People) and Outstanding Preschool Animated Series (Ada Twist, Scientist). She produced the documentary film Crip Camp (2020) and the biographical drama film Rustin (2023).

In 2023, Obama received a Primetime Emmy Award for Outstanding Hosted Nonfiction Series or Special nomination at the 75th Primetime Creative Arts Emmy Awards for the Netflix documentary film The Light We Carry: Michelle Obama and Oprah Winfrey.

==== Television ====
Year	Title	Role	Notes
2012	iCarly	Herself	Episode: "iMeet the First Lady"
2014	Parks and Recreation	Herself	Episodes: "Moving Up: Part One" and "Moving Up: Part Two"
2014	Nashville	Herself	Episode: "All or Nothing with Me"
2014	Jessie	Herself	Episode: "From the White House to Our House"
2015	Doc McStuffins	Herself	Episode: "Doc McStuffins Goes to Washington/Winded Winnie"
2016	NCIS	Herself	Episode: "Homefront"
2019	A Student's Guide to Your First Year of College	Herself	10 episodes
2021	Waffles + Mochi	Herself	Episode: "Tomato"
2022	Black-ish	Herself	Episode: "That's What Friends Are For"
2022	Waffles + Mochi's Restaurant	Herself	Episodes: "Bread", "Honey", "Cheese"

==== Producer ====
Year	Title	Role	Notes
2020	Crip Camp	Executive Producer	Documentary
2020	Becoming	Producer	Documentary
2021	Waffles + Mochi	Executive Producer	10 episodes
2021	We the People	Executive Producer	10 episodes
2021	Ada Twist, Scientist	Executive Producer	6 episodes
2021	Waffles + Mochi: Holiday Feast	Executive Producer	TV Special
2022	The G Word	Executive Producer	TV Mini-Series
2023	Rustin	Executive Producer	Film
2023	American Symphony	Executive Producer	Film
2023	Leave the World Behind	Executive Producer	Film
2024	Bodkin	Executive Producer	7 episodes
2024-2025	Starting 5	Executive Producer	18 episodes
2025	Court of Gold	Executive Producer	6 episodes; TV Mini-Series
2025	Air Force Elite: Thunderbirds	Executive Producer	Film
2025	The Eyes of Ghana	Executive Producer	Film
2026	Life, Larry and the Pursuit of Unhappiness	Executive Producer	TV Mini-Series
2026	The Altruists	Executive Producer	Episode: "#1.1"
2026	The Later Daters	Executive Producer	Episode: "#2.1"

== Awards and honors ==
In 2019, Time created 89 new covers to celebrate women of the year starting from 1920; it chose Obama for 2008.

In November 2023, Obama was named to the BBC's 100 Women list.

Year	Award	Category	Nominated work	Result	Ref.
2019	Grammy Awards	Best Spoken Word Album	Becoming	Won	
2023	Grammy Awards	Best Audio Book, Narration & Storytelling Recording	The Light We Carry: Overcoming in Uncertain Times	Won	
2020	Audie Awards	Audiobook of the Year	Becoming	Nominated	
2020	Audie Awards	Narration by the Author	Becoming	Nominated	
2020	Audie Awards	Autobiography or Memoir	Becoming	Won	
2023	Primetime Emmy Awards	Outstanding Hosted Nonfiction Series or Special	The Light We Carry: Michelle Obama and Oprah Winfrey	Nominated	

== Bibliography ==
- Obama, Michelle (2012). American Grown: The Story of the White House Kitchen Garden and Gardens Across America. New York: Crown Publishing Group. ISBN 978-0-307-95602-6. OCLC 790271044.
- Obama, Michelle (2018). Becoming. New York: Crown Publishing Group. ISBN 978-1-5247-6313-8. OCLC 1030413521.
- Obama, Michelle (2022). The Light We Carry: Overcoming in Uncertain Times. New York: Crown Publishing Group. ISBN 978-0-5932-3746-5. OCLC 1336957651.
- Obama, Michelle (2024). Overcoming: A Workbook. Penguin Random House. ISBN 978-0-5932-3749-6.
- Obama, Michelle (2025). The Look. Penguin Random House. ISBN 978-0-5938-0070-6.

Honorary titles
Preceded by Laura Bush	First Lady of the United States; 2009–2017	Succeeded by Melania Trump
