= The Mighty and the Almighty =

2006 memoir by Madeleine Albright

The Mighty and the Almighty: Reflections on America, God, and World Affairs
- First edition
- Author: Madeleine Albright
- Language: English
- Genre: Memoir
- Publisher: HarperCollins
- Publication date: 2006
- Publication place: United States

The Mighty and the Almighty: Reflections on America, God, and World Affairs is a 2006 memoir written by Madeleine Albright, former United States Secretary of State.

The memoir expresses a view of God and religion as they relate to U.S. and global politics according to Albright's experience in public service. Particular issues addressed include Islamic fundamentalism and Evangelicalism and the role each played in the Bush White House, and discussion of Albright's childhood and her own personal traumas.

== Synopsis ==
The book explores Albright's childhood as a Catholic, her conversion to the Episcopal faith at the time of her marriage, and how late in life she discovered her Jewish roots. The book discusses the personal traumas that marked her life, including the sudden departure of her husband of 23 years for another woman, the death of her father, the stillbirth of a child, and the discovery by the media in the 1990s that three of her grandparents were Jewish and had died in Nazi camps.
