= White House Honey Ale =

First beer to be brewed in the White House

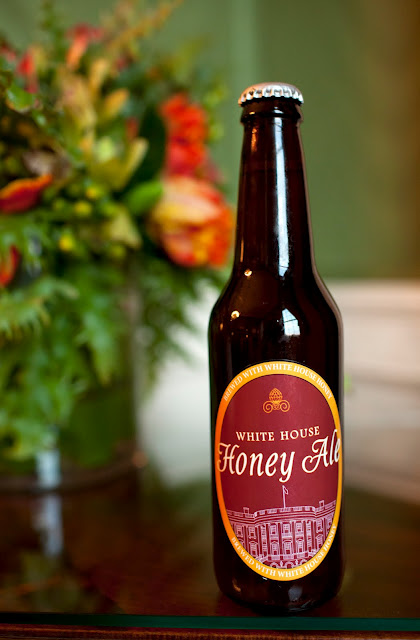
- A bottle of White House Honey Ale.
- Manufacturer: White House Brewery
- Introduced: 2011
- Style: Top-fermented beer

White House Honey Ale is the first beer known to have been brewed in the White House. The process began in January 2011 at the request of President Barack Obama, who purchased the homebrewing kit using personal funds. As of 2012, three styles have been brewed in addition to the honey ale: White House Honey Blonde Ale, White House Honey Porter and White House Honey Brown.

== Background ==
The chefs at the White House are said to use "traditional methods" to brew the beer, before it is bottled and labelled with a customized logo. It includes a pound of honey collected from beehives on the South Lawn. The logo features a line drawing of the White House on a maroon background encircled in yellow.

The beer has been brewed for various events held at the White House. A Super Bowl party, attended by nearly 200 guests including acquainted celebrities and members of the U.S. Congress, was one of the first events where the ale was served. Nearly 10 US gallons (38 L) were produced for the party, with around 90 to 100 bottles available. Some bottles were also brewed for St. Patrick's Day.

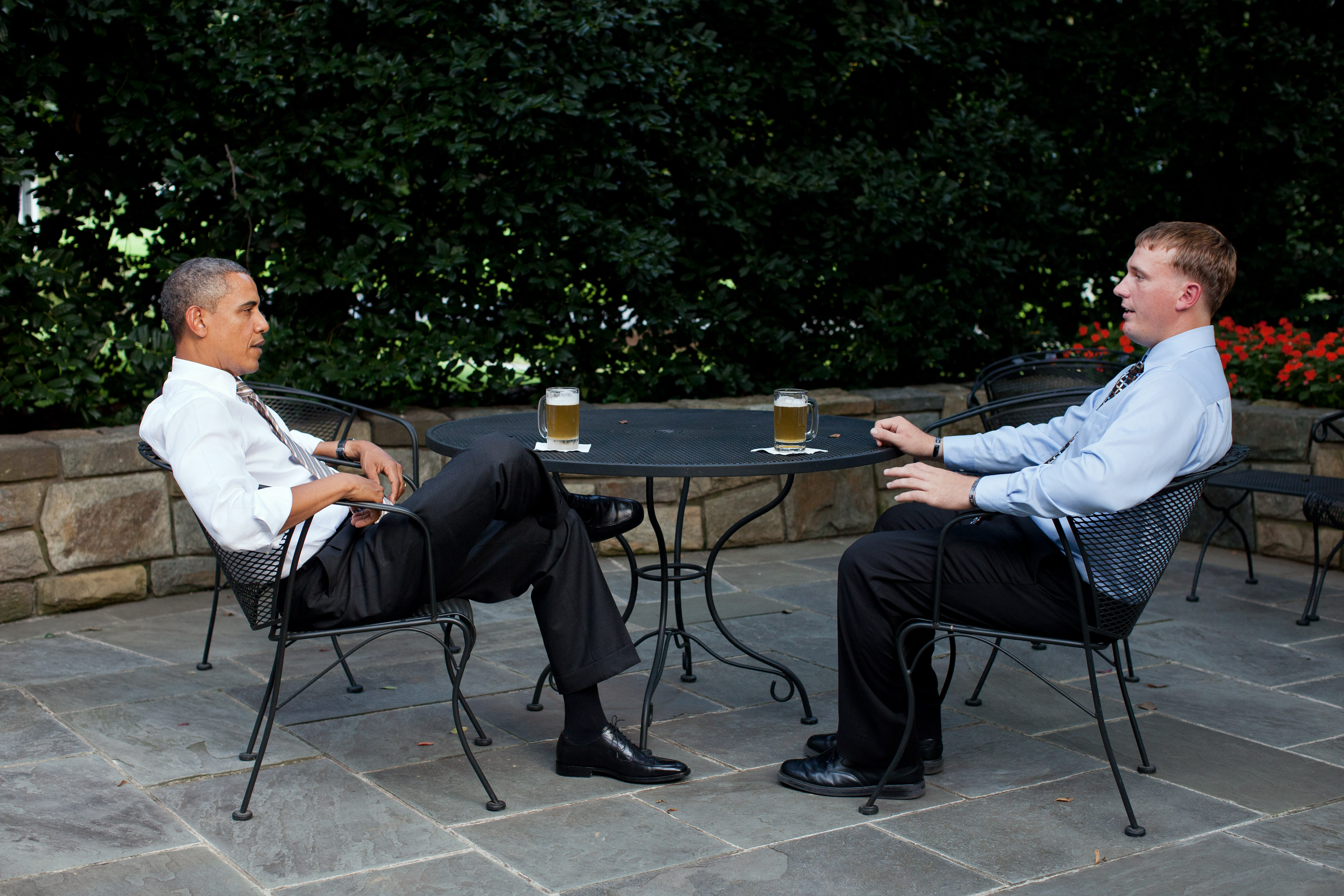
Barack Obama and Dakota Meyer drinking White House Honey Ale on September 15, 2011.

On September 15, 2011, former United States Marine Corps Sergeant Dakota Meyer was the recipient of the Medal of Honor at the White House. Earlier, when informed of his award over the phone, he requested to share a beer with President Obama. The president accepted the offer and they each drank a bottle of the ale on the patio outside the Oval Office.

Former president Thomas Jefferson, who lived in the White House between 1801 and 1809, is known to have brewed beer himself, particularly after his retirement. He has been called "America's first microbrewer", but there is no evidence that it happened at the White House.

== Petition ==
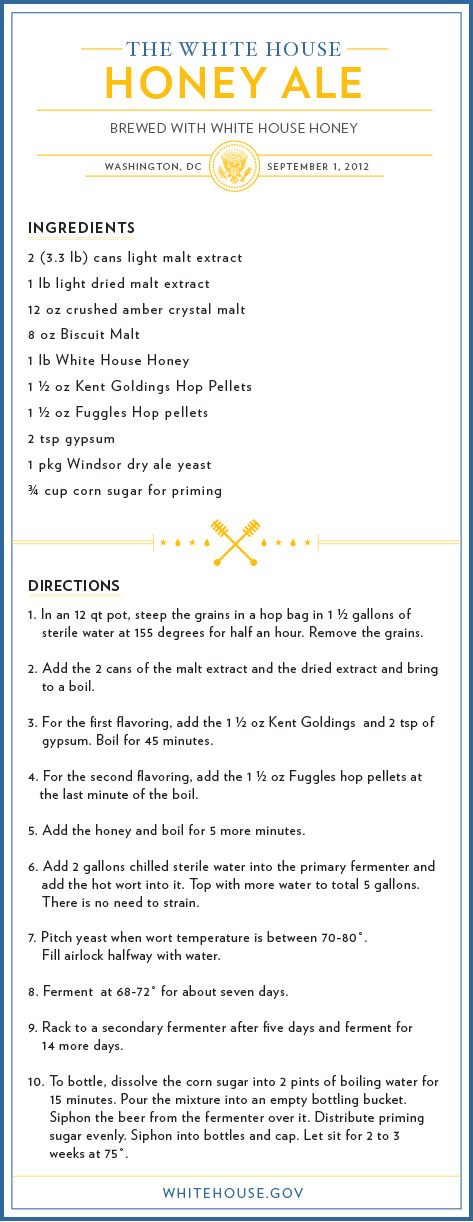
Official recipe as described.

On August 21, 2012, at least two Freedom of Information Act requests were sent to the White House seeking the recipe of the White House Honey Ale from California attorney Scott Talkov and Texas attorney Brodie Burks, both home brewers. On August 29, 2012 during a brief Q&A session on Reddit, President Obama announced he would release the recipe, stating, "It will be out soon! I can tell from firsthand experience, it is tasty."

The recipe was released on September 1, 2012 on whitehouse.gov. As work of the United States Federal Government, the recipe is in the public domain.

== Style ==
White House Honey Ale does not match a specific beer style as outlined by the Beer Judge Certification Program style guidelines. Gravity, alcohol by volume, bitterness and color are within the guidelines for a Belgian Dubbel, however the English hop and yeast selection are not in keeping with the Belgian Dubbel style. Therefore, this beer would fall under BJCP Category 23- Specialty Beer.
