= Grammy Award for Best Audio Book, Narration & Storytelling Recording =

Award

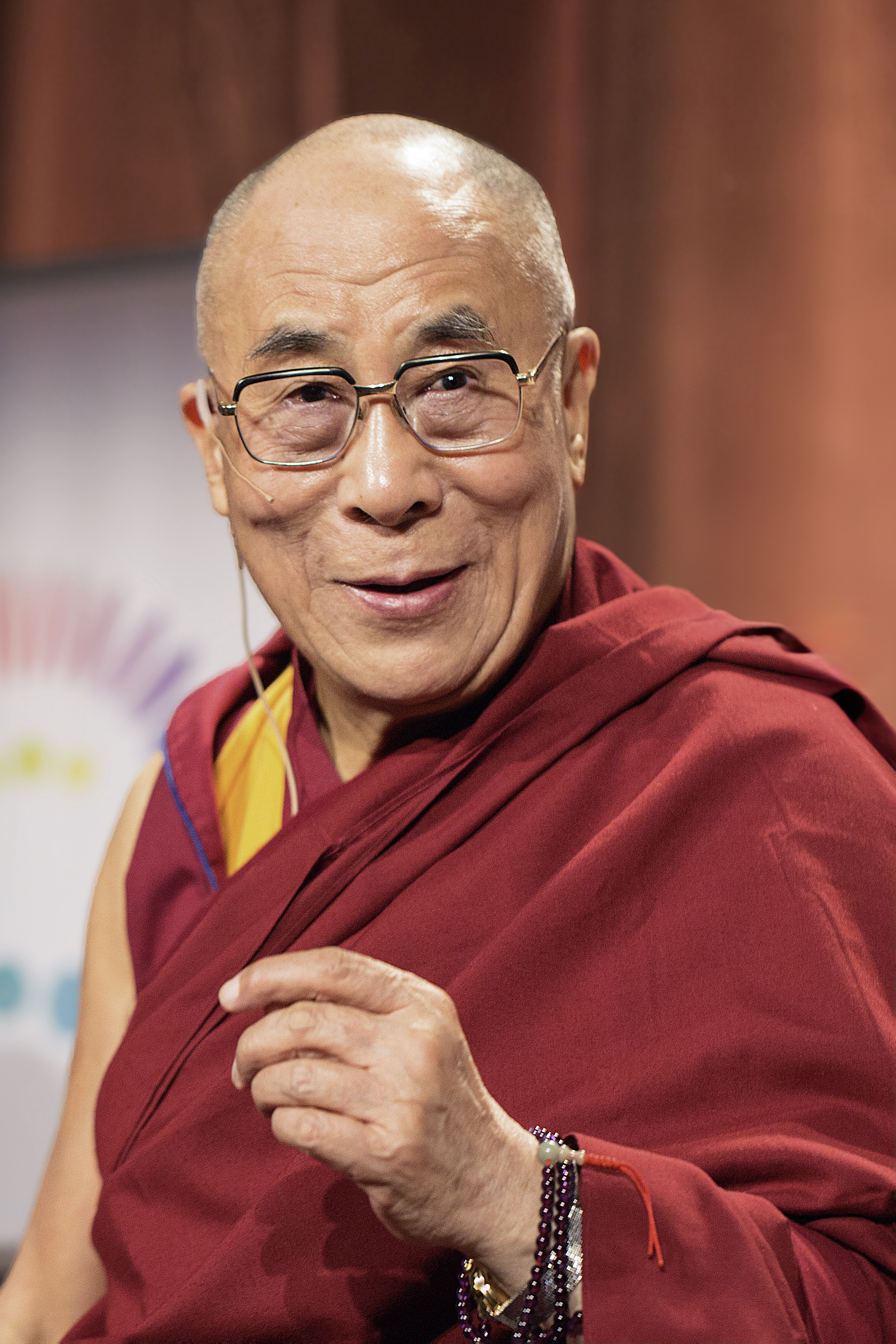
- Meditations: Reflections of His Holiness the Dalai Lama by Tenzin Gyatso, the Dalai Lama is the most recent recipient
- Awarded for: quality spoken word albums
- Country: United States
- Presented by: National Academy of Recording Arts and Sciences
- First award: 1959
- Currently held by: The Dalai Lama – Meditations: The Reflections of His Holiness The Dalai Lama (2026)
- Website: grammy.com

The Grammy Award for Best Spoken Word Album has been awarded since 1959. The award has had several minor name changes:

- In 1959 the award was known as Best Performance, Documentary or Spoken Word
- From 1960 to 1961 it was awarded as Best Performance – Documentary or Spoken Word (other than comedy)
- From 1962 to 1963 it was awarded as Best Documentary or Spoken Word Recording (other than comedy)
- From 1964 to 1965 it was awarded as Best Documentary, Spoken Word or Drama Recording (other than comedy)
- In 1966 it was awarded as Best Spoken Word or Drama Recording
- From 1967 to 1968 it was awarded as Best Spoken Word, Documentary or Drama Recording
- From 1969 to 1979 it was awarded as Best Spoken Word Recording
- From 1980 to 1983 it returned to the title of Best Spoken Word, Documentary or Drama Recording
- From 1984 to 1991 it was awarded as Best Spoken Word or Non-Musical Recording
- From 1992 to 1997 it was awarded as Best Spoken Word or Non-Musical Album
- From 1998 to 2022 it was awarded as Best Spoken Word Album. In 2020, spoken-word children's albums were moved here from the Best Children's Album category.
- From 2023 it has been awarded as Best Audio Book, Narration & Storytelling Recording. Poetry reading now has its own Grammy category, Best Spoken Word Poetry Album.

Years reflect the year in which the Grammy Awards were handed out, for a recording released in the previous year.

== Recipients ==
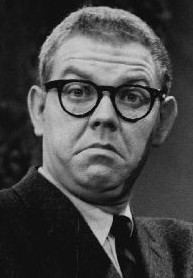
Stan Freberg was the first recipient of the award in 1959.

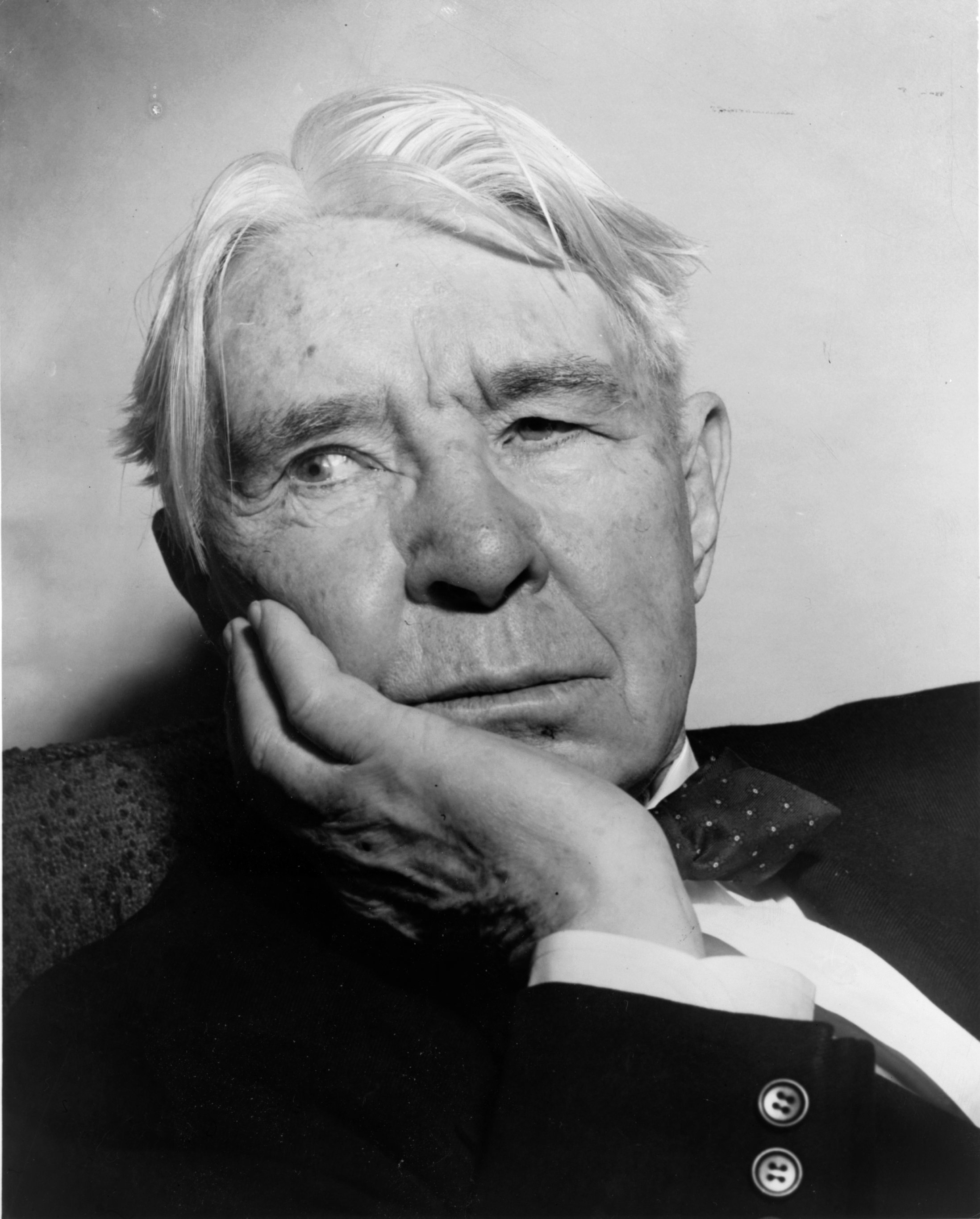
Carl Sandburg received the award in 1960.

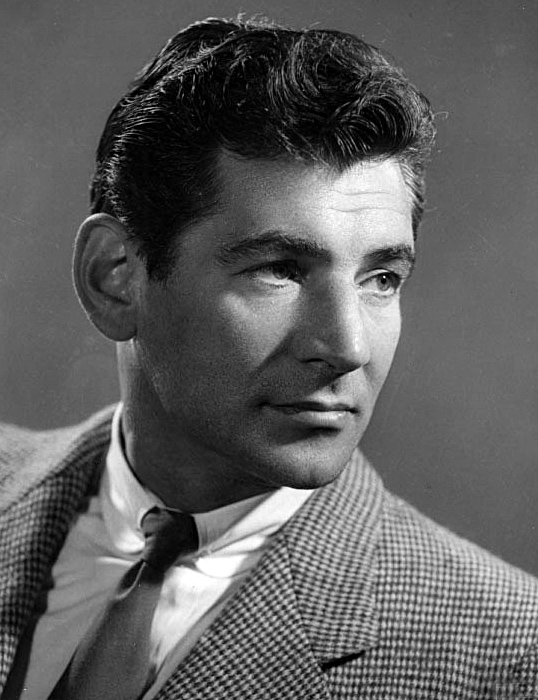
Leonard Bernstein received the award in 1962.

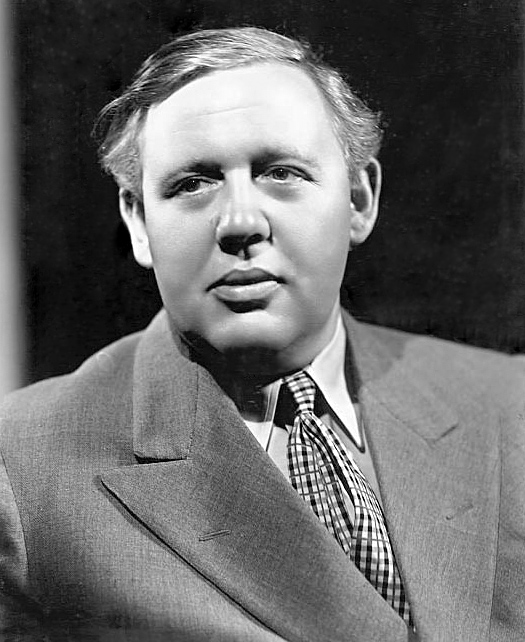
Charles Laughton received the award in 1963.

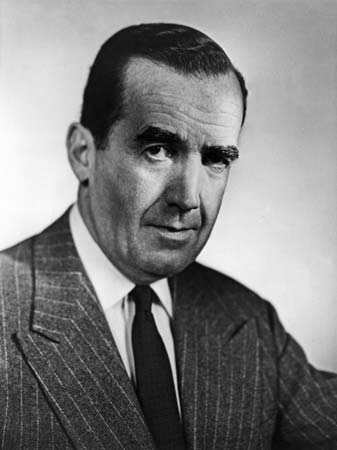
Edward R. Murrow received the award in 1967.

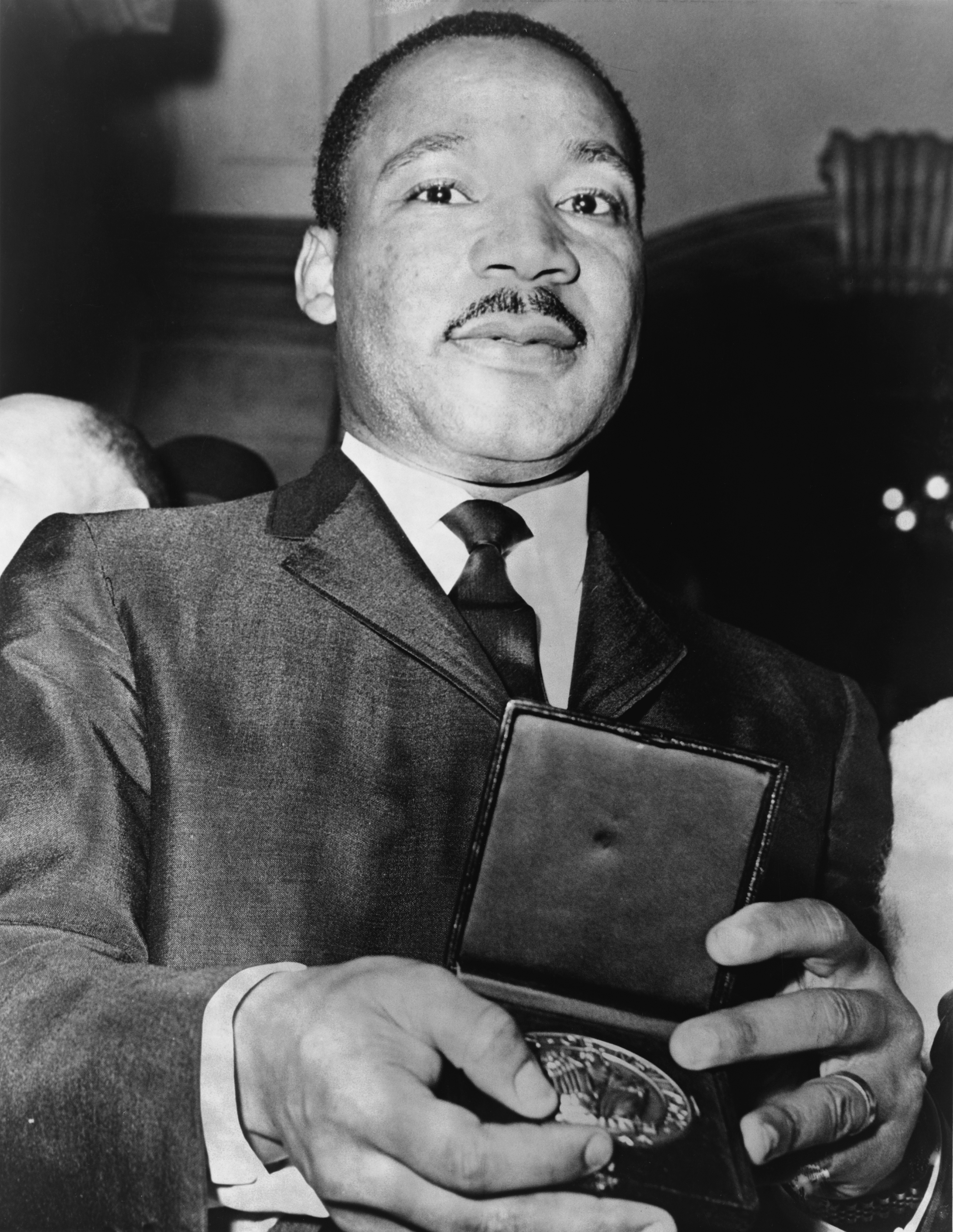
Martin Luther King Jr. won the award posthumously in 1971 for Why I Oppose the War in Vietnam.

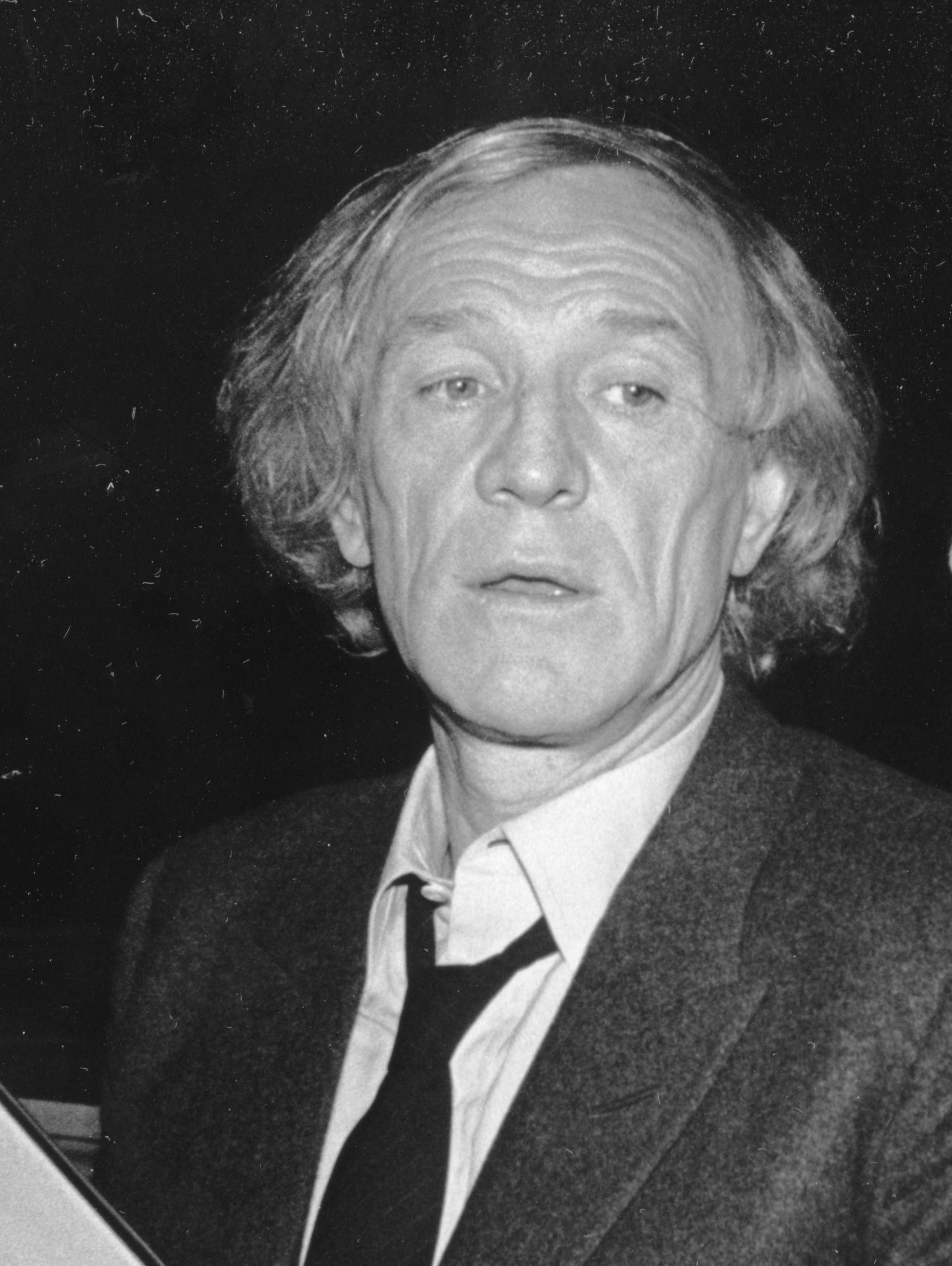
Richard Harris won the award in 1974.

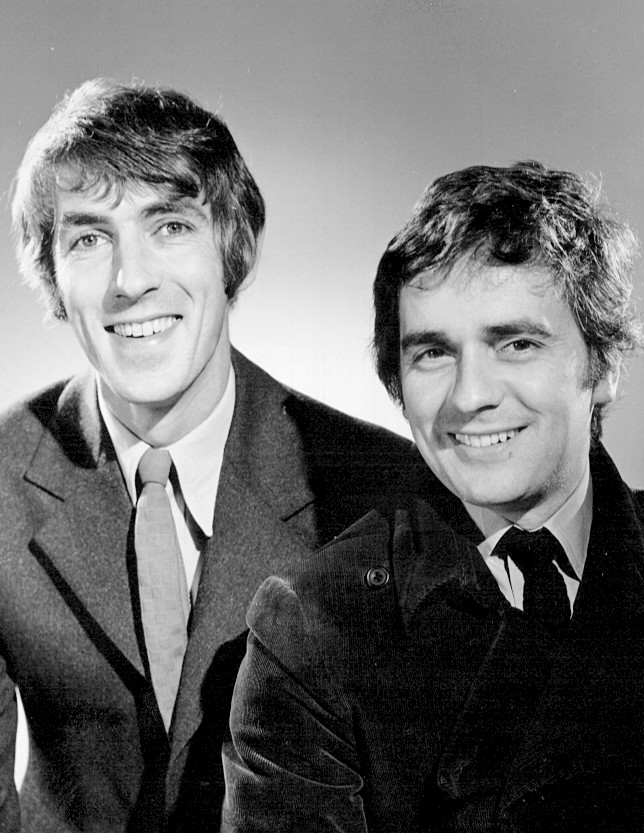
Peter Cook & Dudley Moore won the award in 1975.

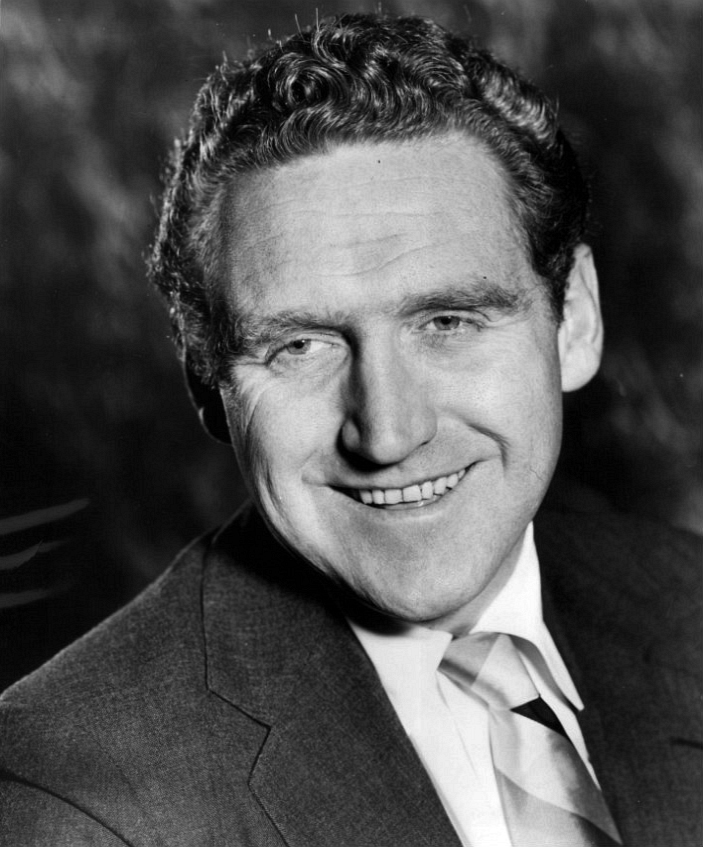
James Whitmore won the award in 1976.

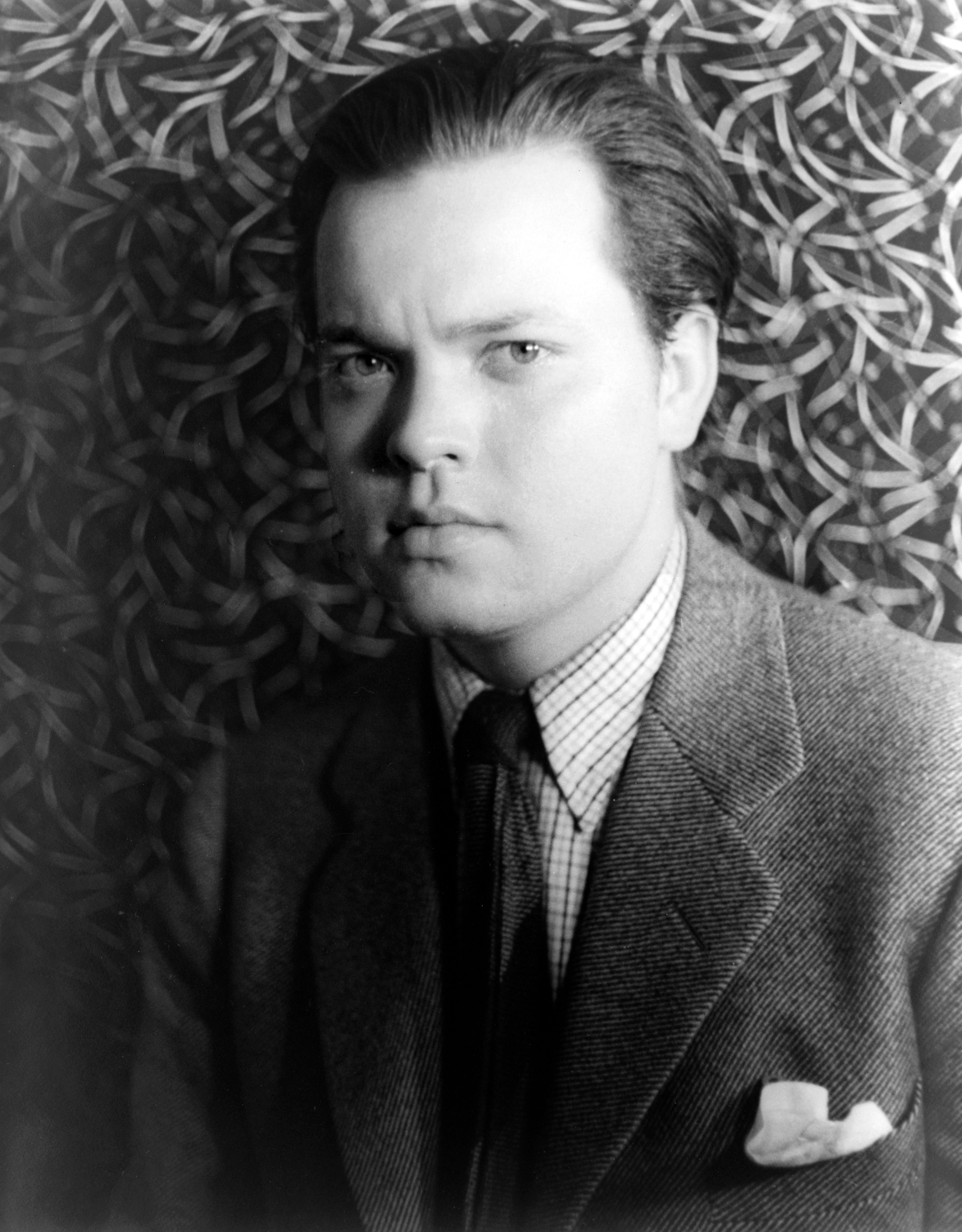
Director Orson Welles received the award twice, in 1977 and 1979.

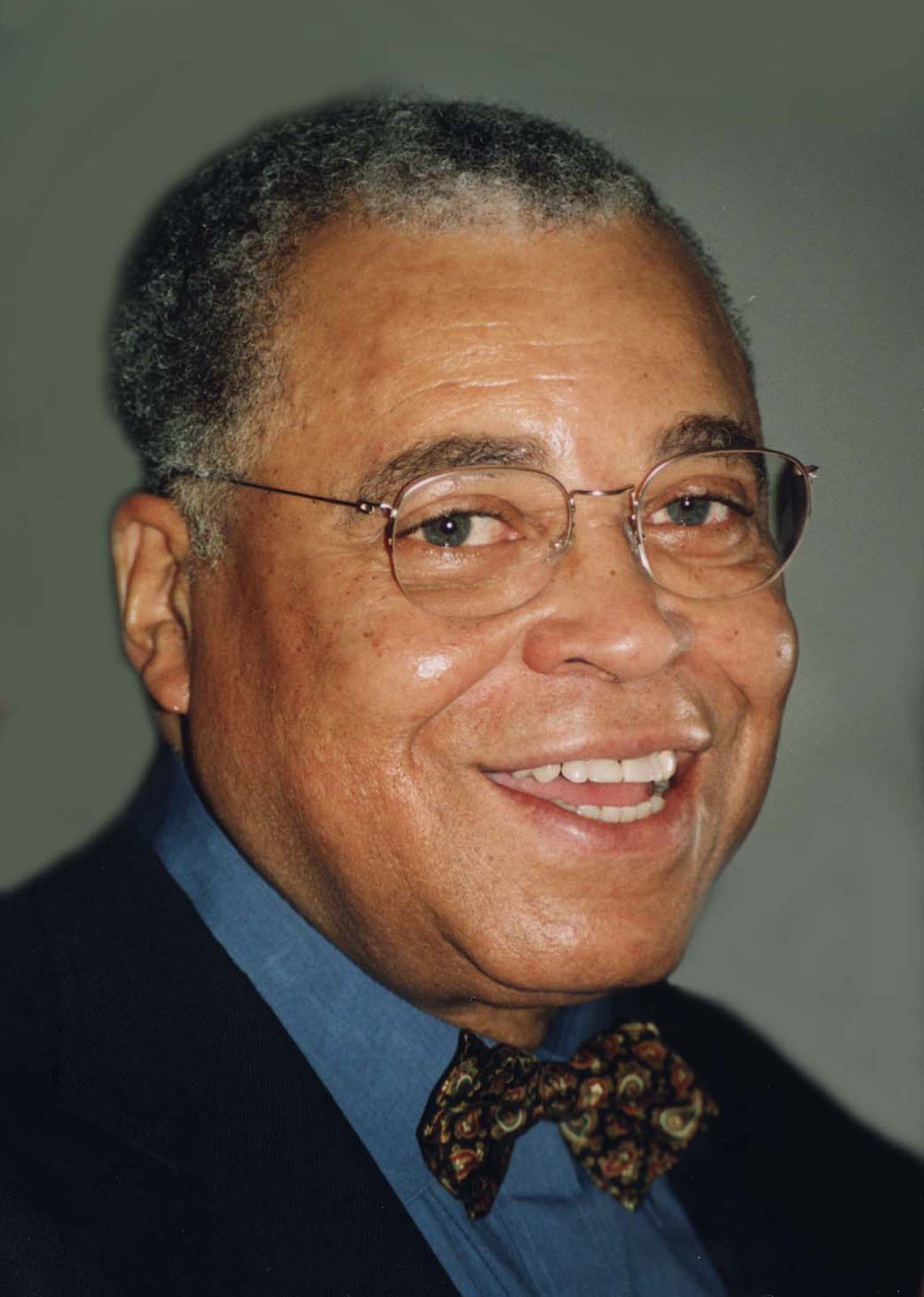
James Earl Jones received the award in 1977.

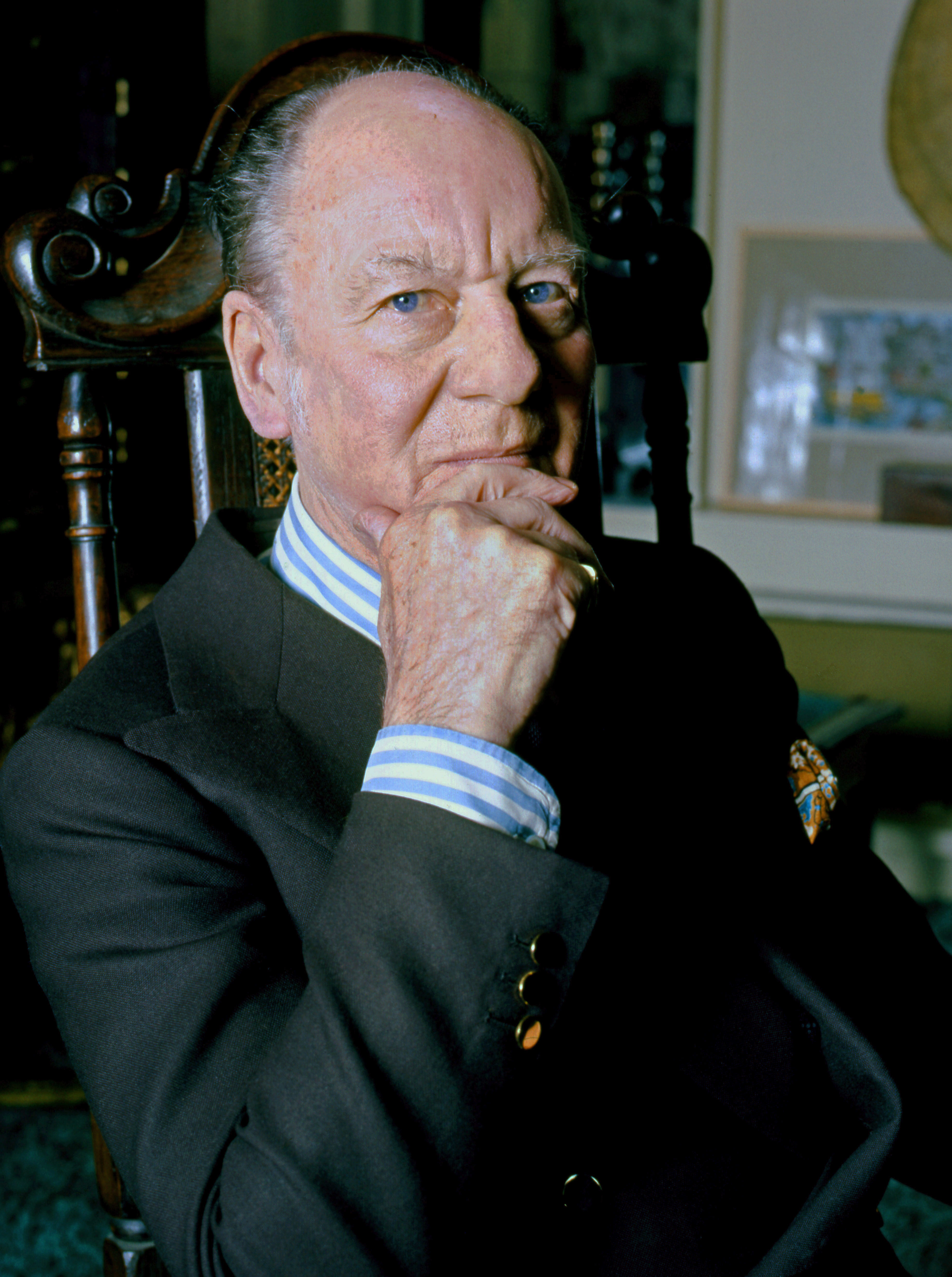
8-time nominee Sir John Gielgud received the award in 1980.

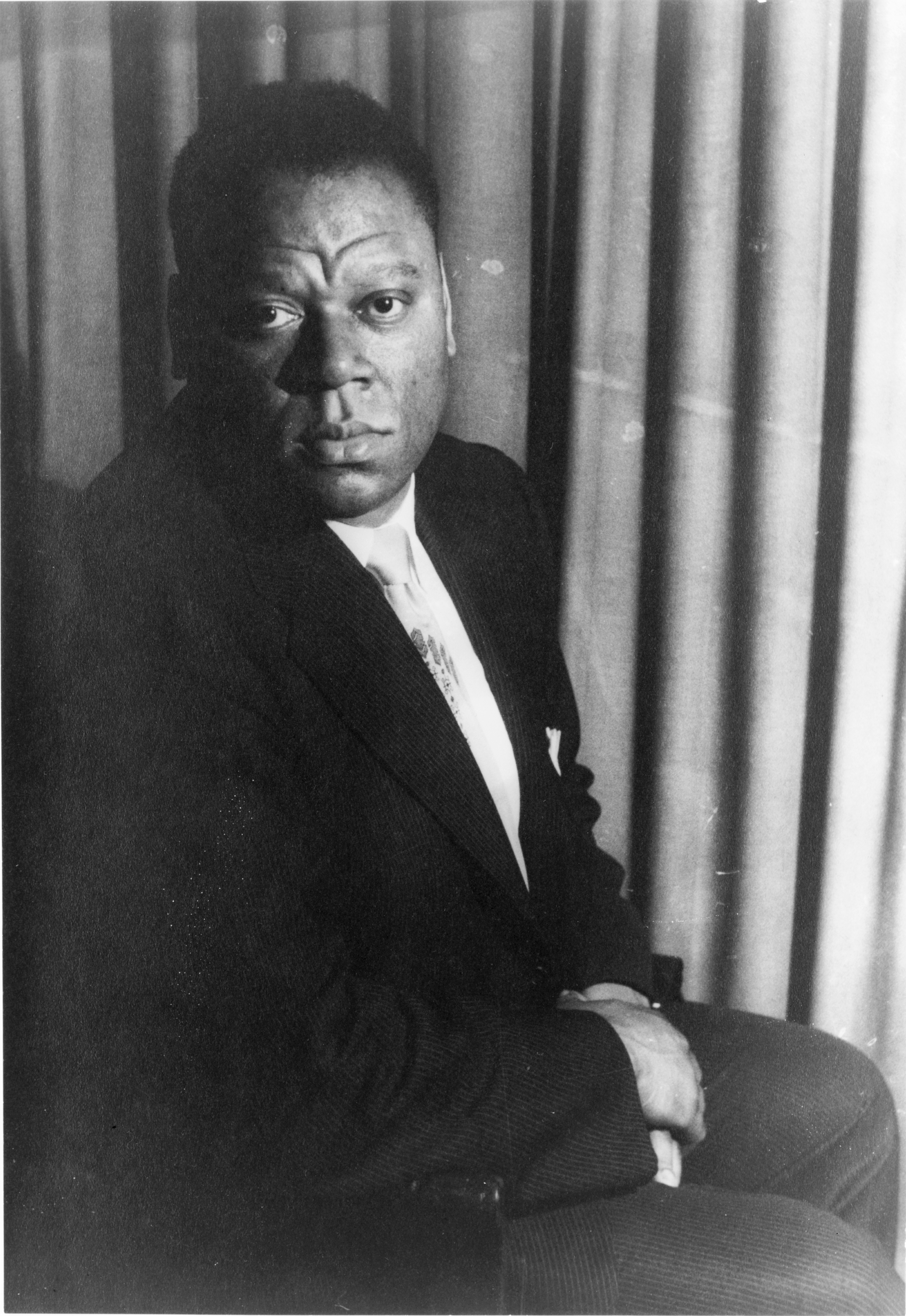
William Warfield received the award in 1984.

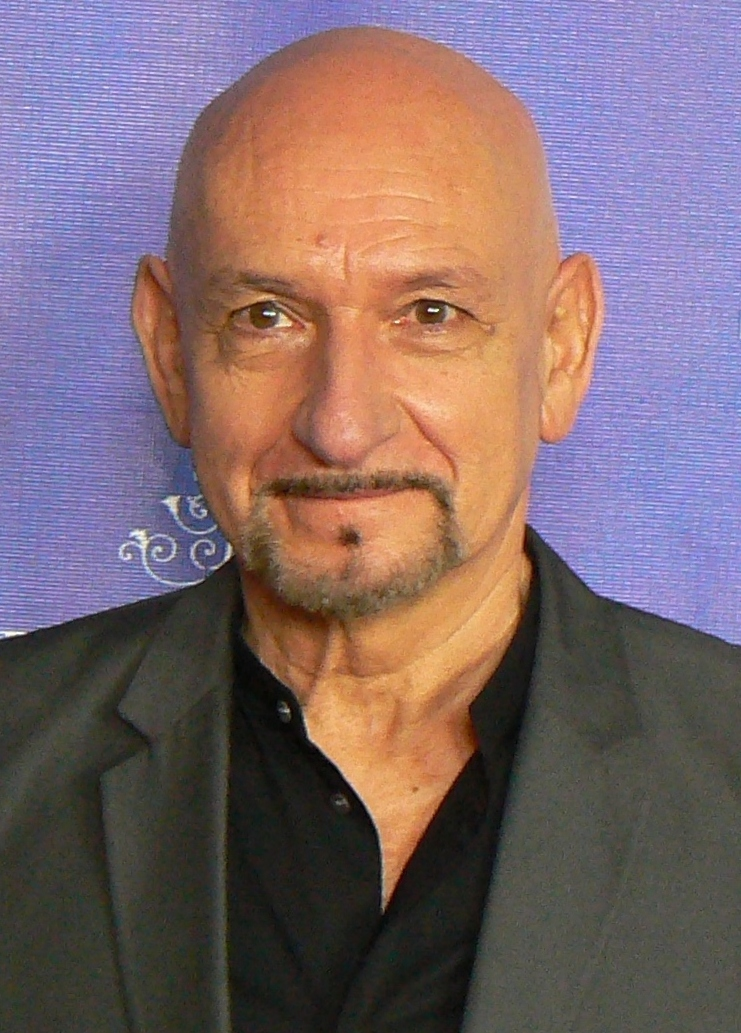
Actor Sir Ben Kingsley won for The Words of Gandhi in 1985.

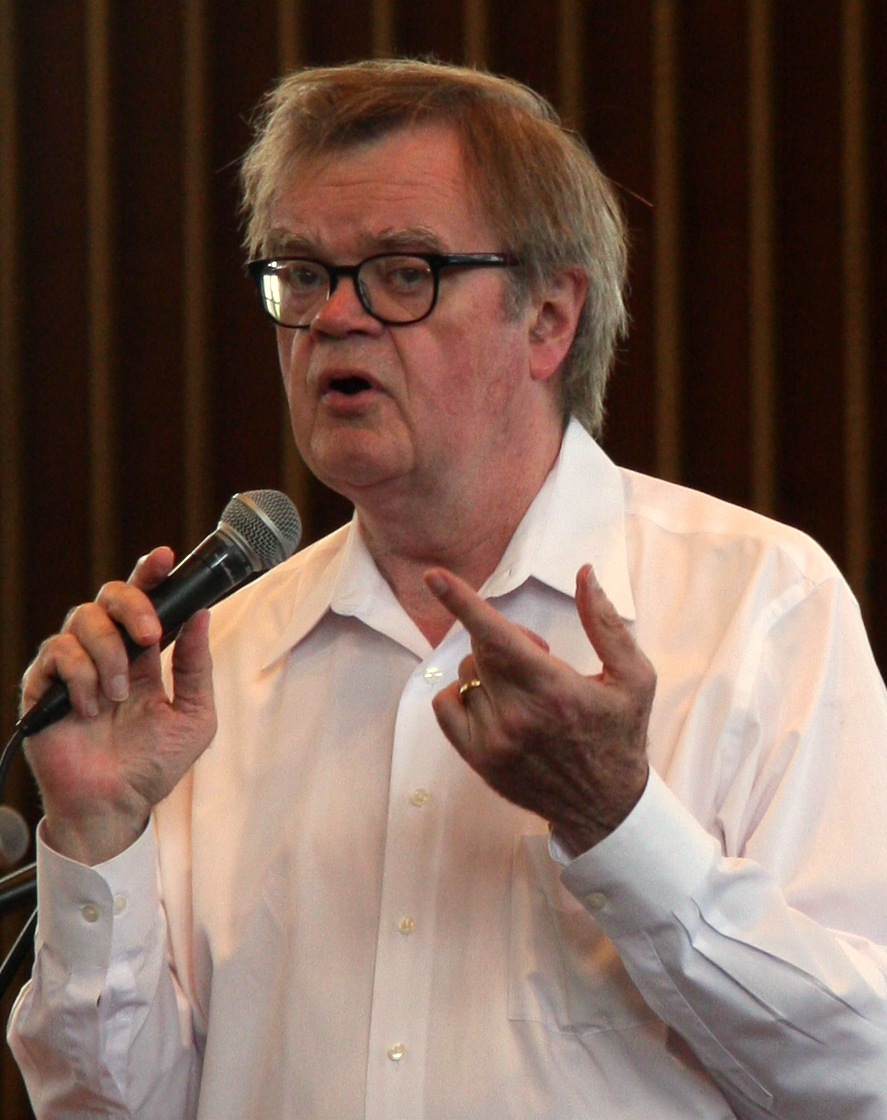
Garrison Keillor won the award in 1988.

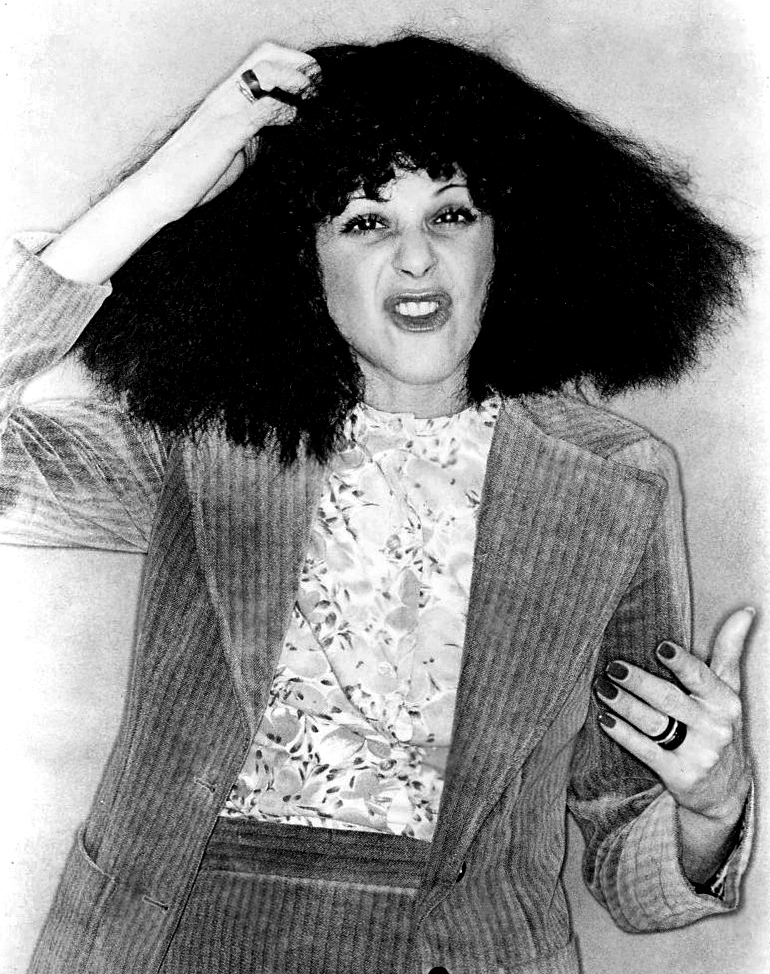
1990 award winner, comedian Gilda Radner.

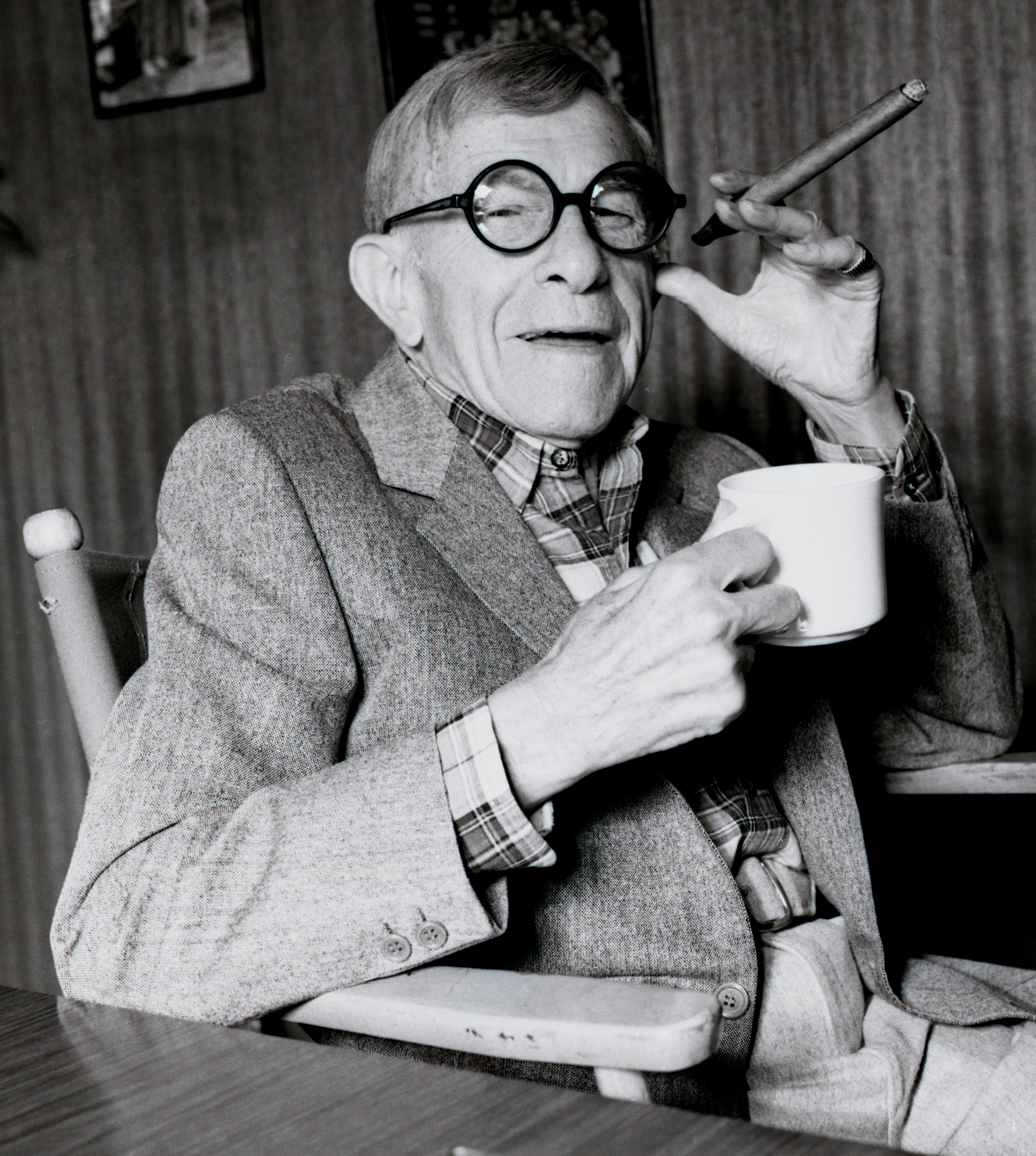
Comedian George Burns won the award in 1991.

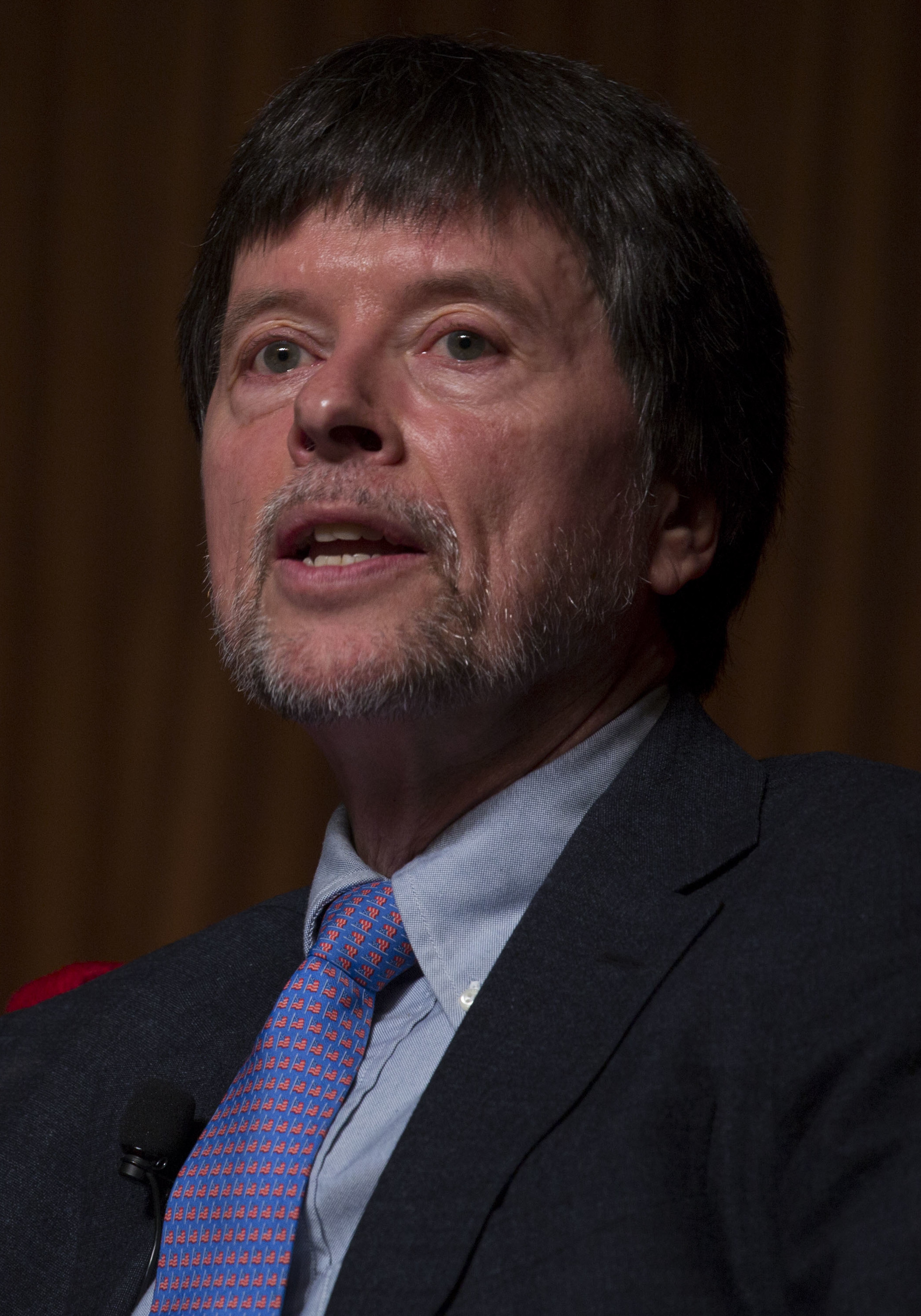
Documentarian Ken Burns won in 1992.

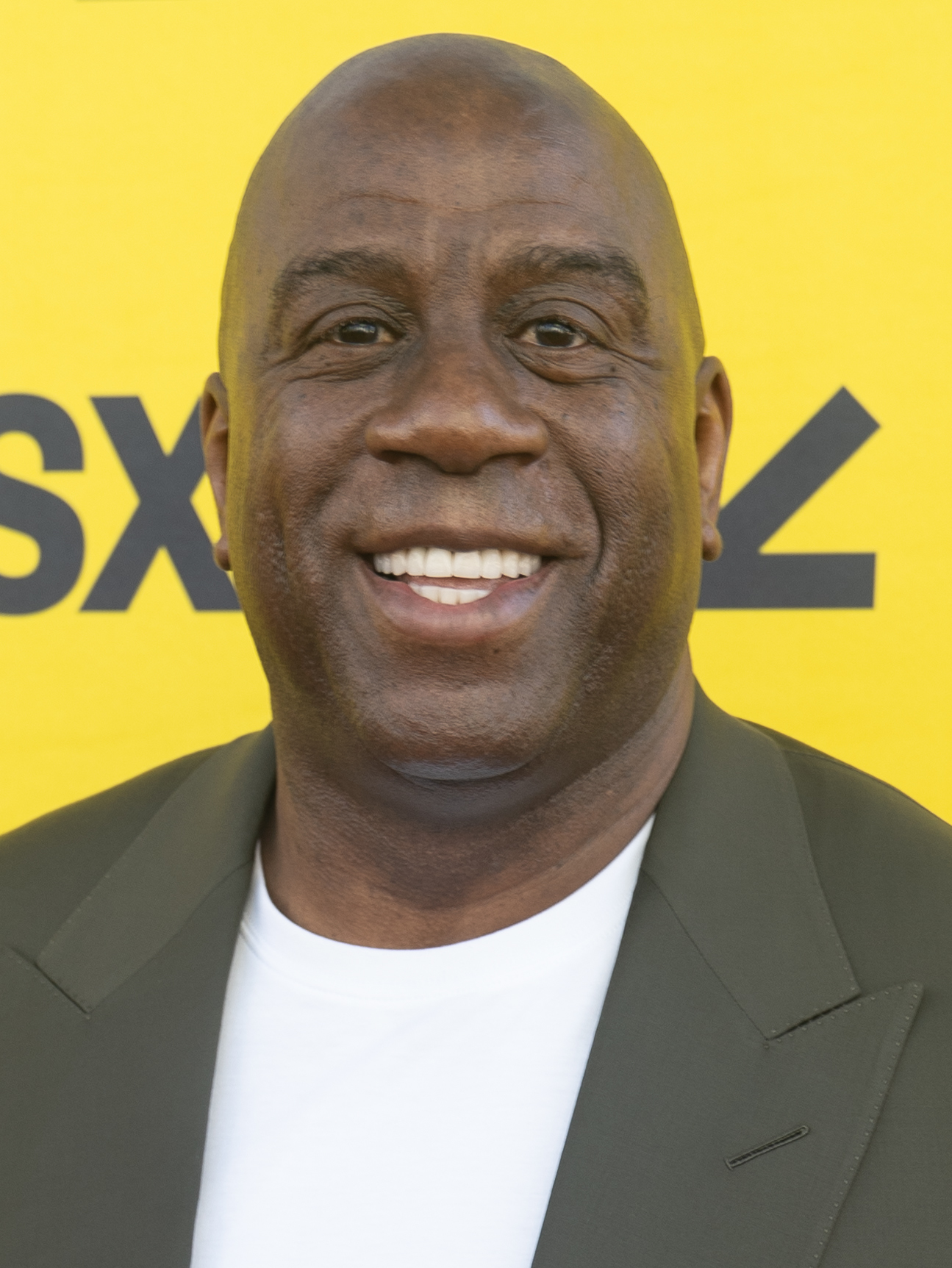
Magic Johnson won in 1993.

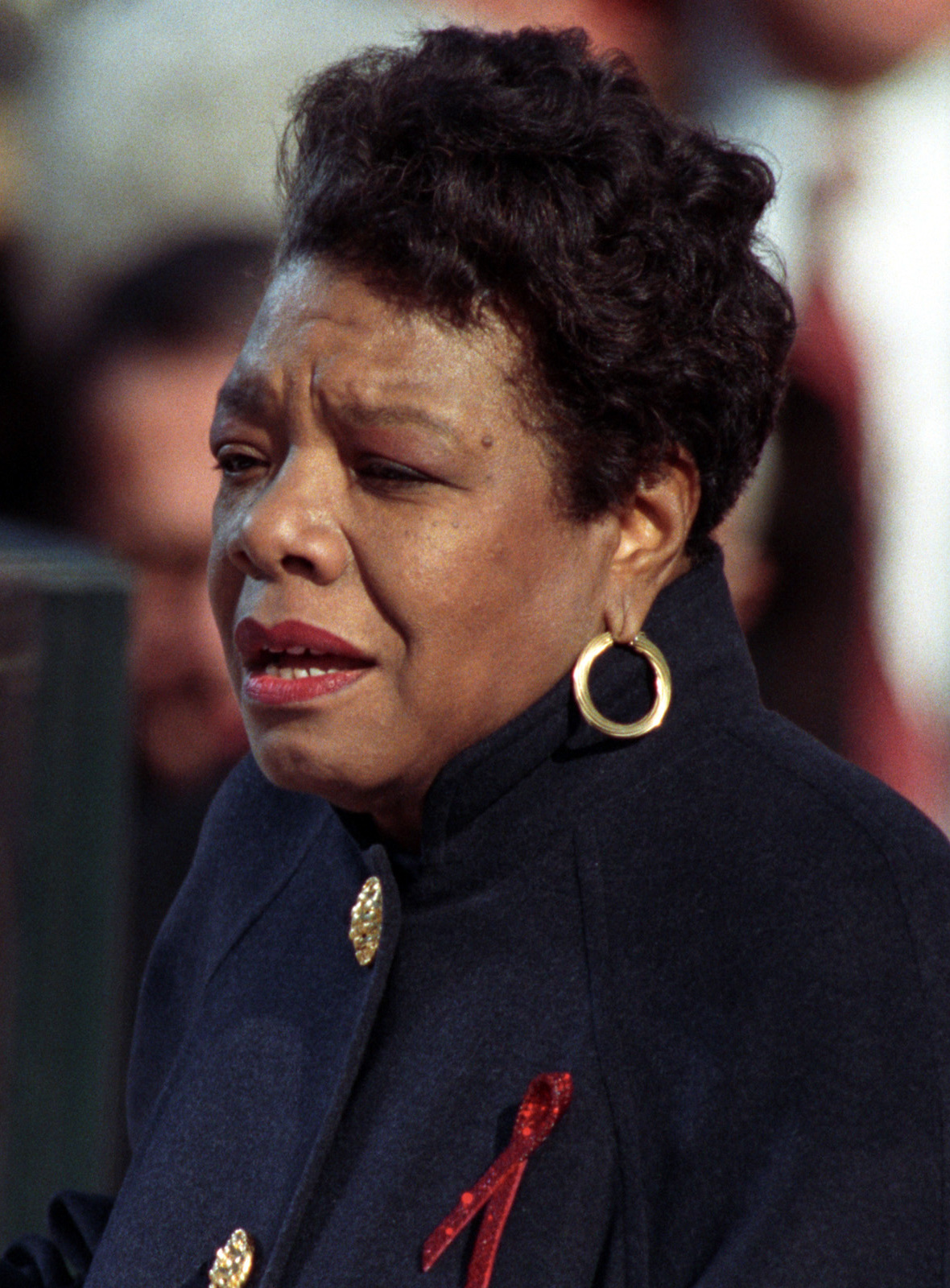
Three-time winner, American poet Maya Angelou.

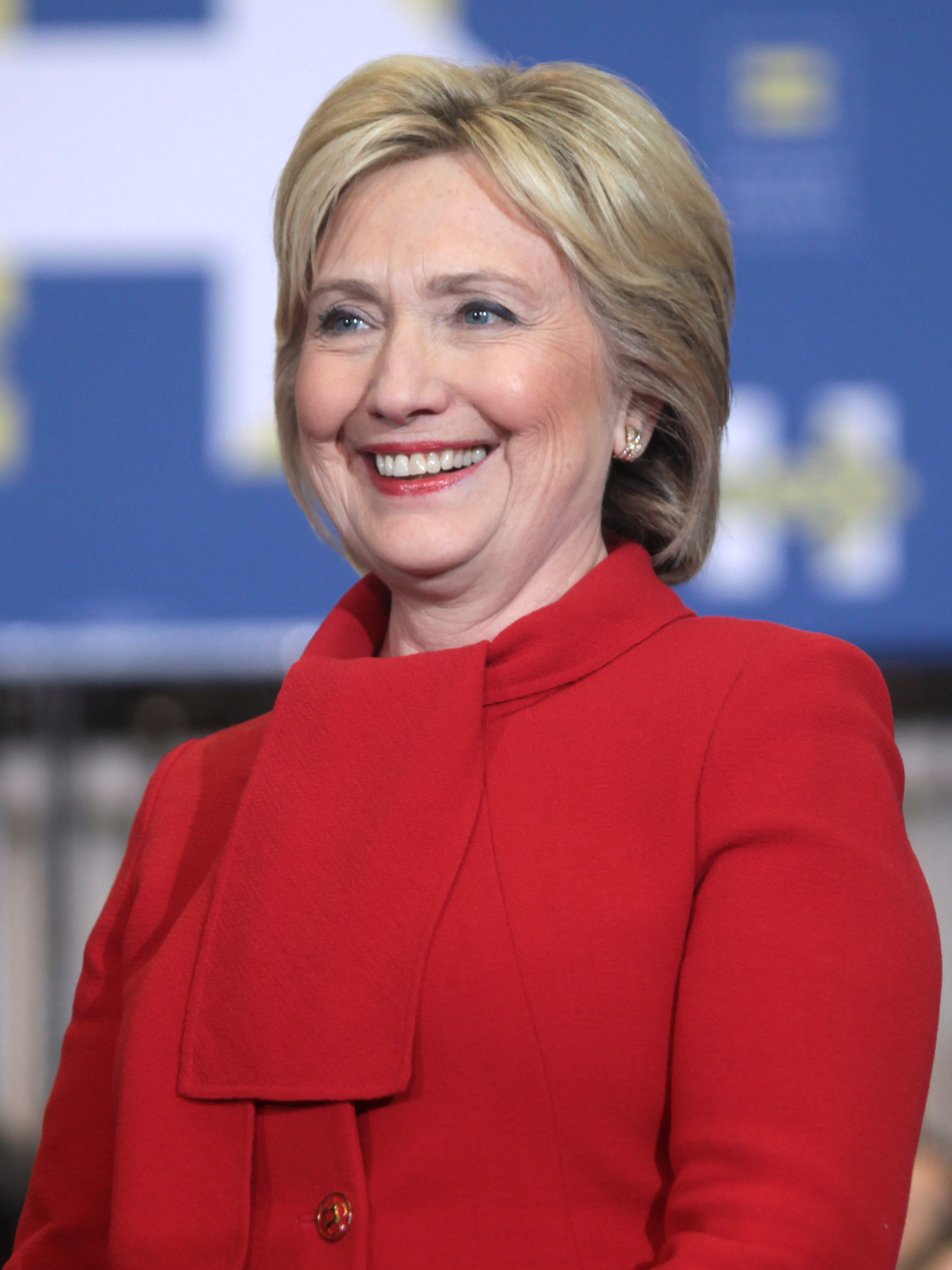
Former First Lady of the United States Hillary Clinton won the award in 1997.

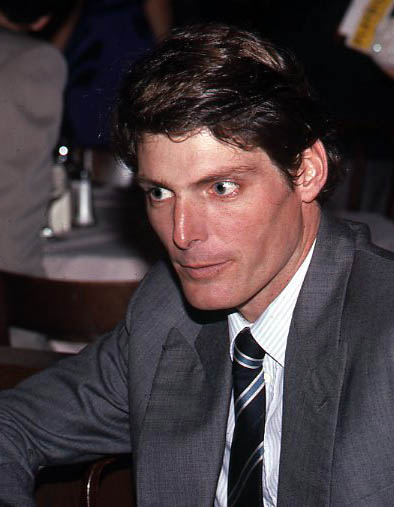
Christopher Reeve won in 1999.

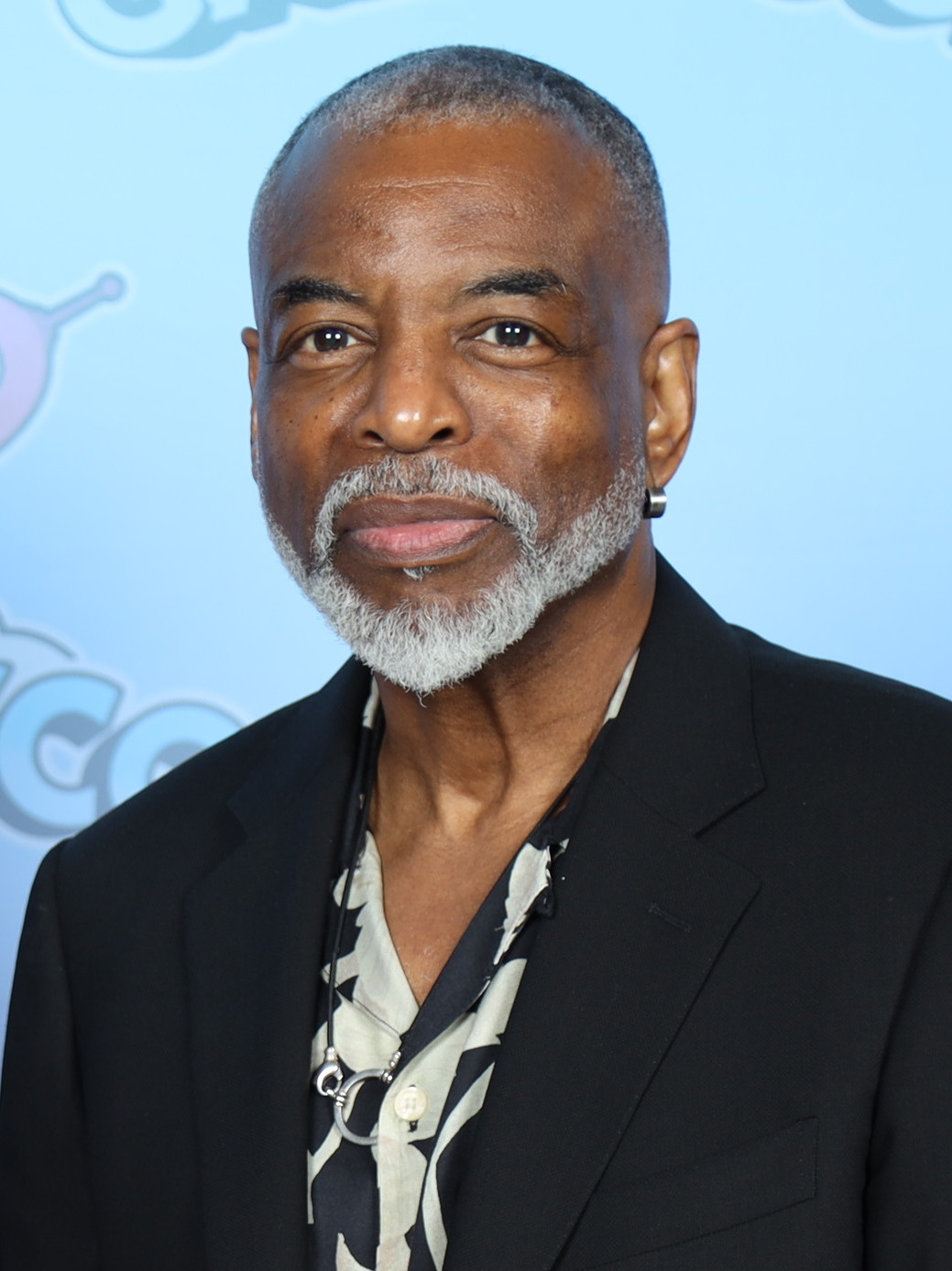
LeVar Burton won the award in 2000.

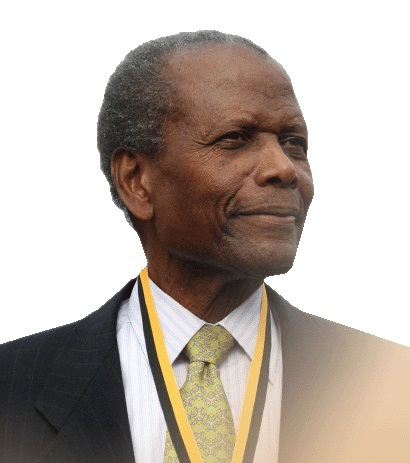
Actor Sidney Poitier won the award for his autobiography The Measure of a Man in 2001.

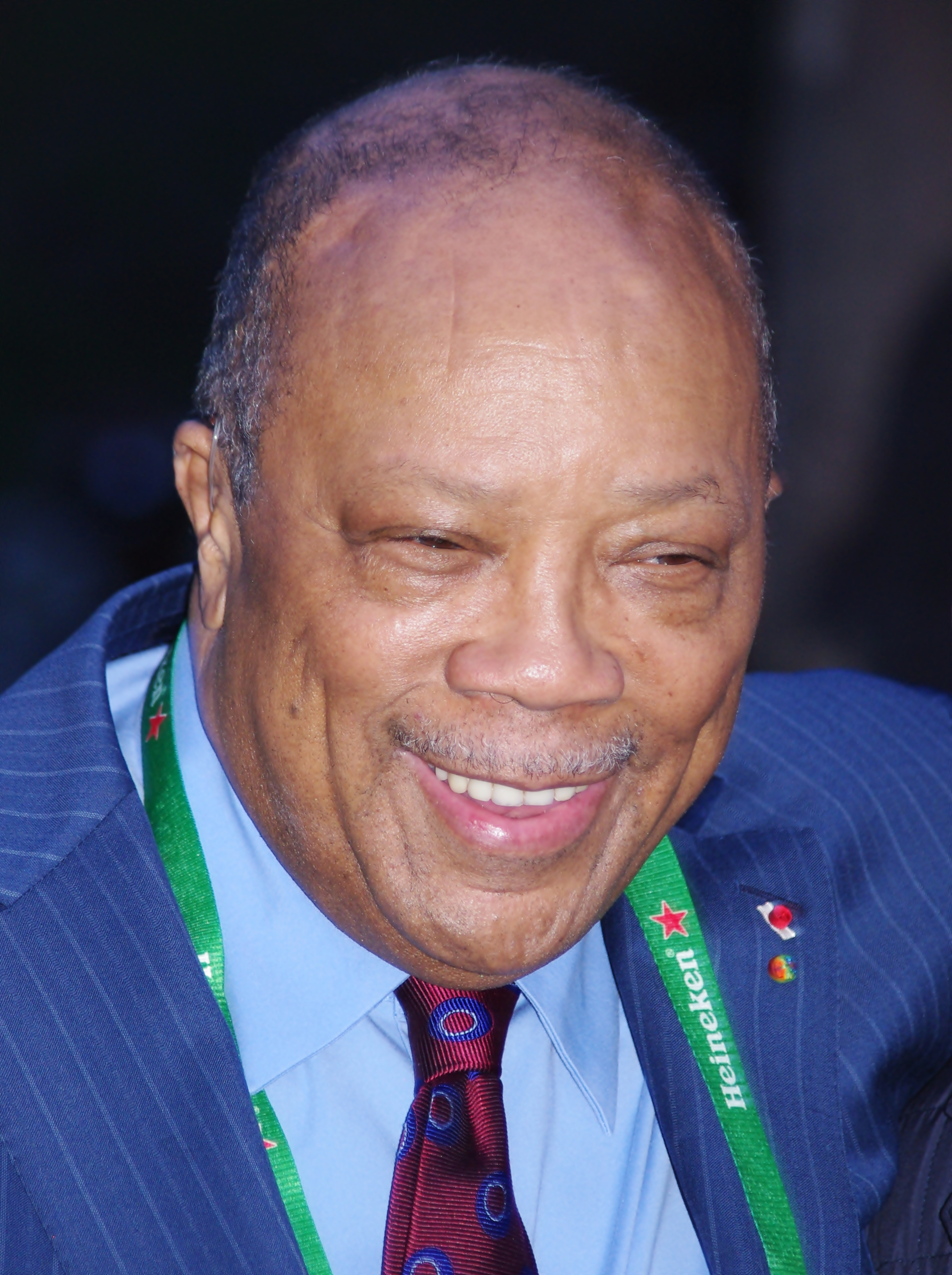
Quincy Jones won in 2002.

Former President of the United States Bill Clinton won in 2005.

Two-time winner, former President of the United States Barack Obama won in 2006 and 2008.

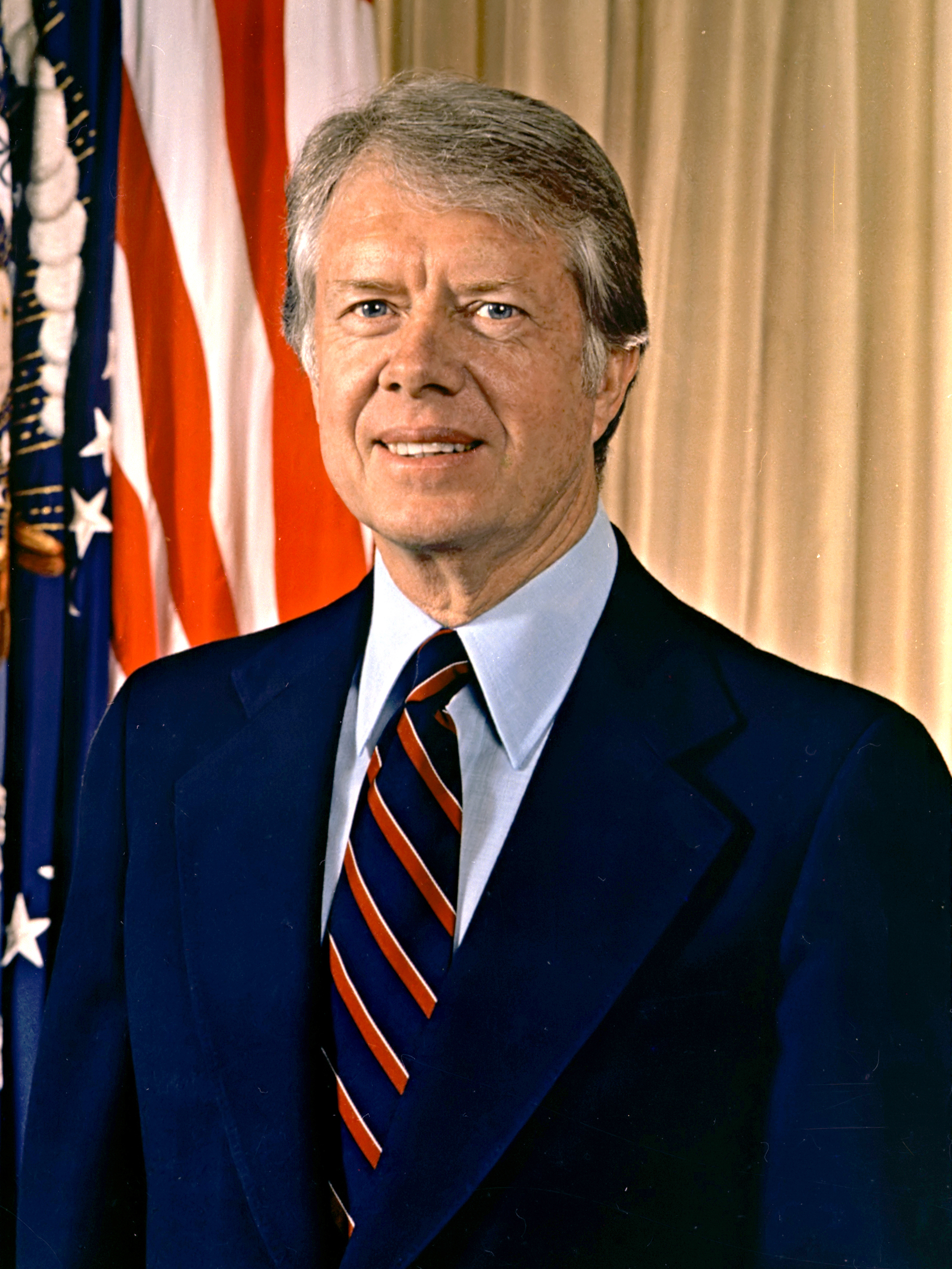
Four-time winner, former President of the United States Jimmy Carter.

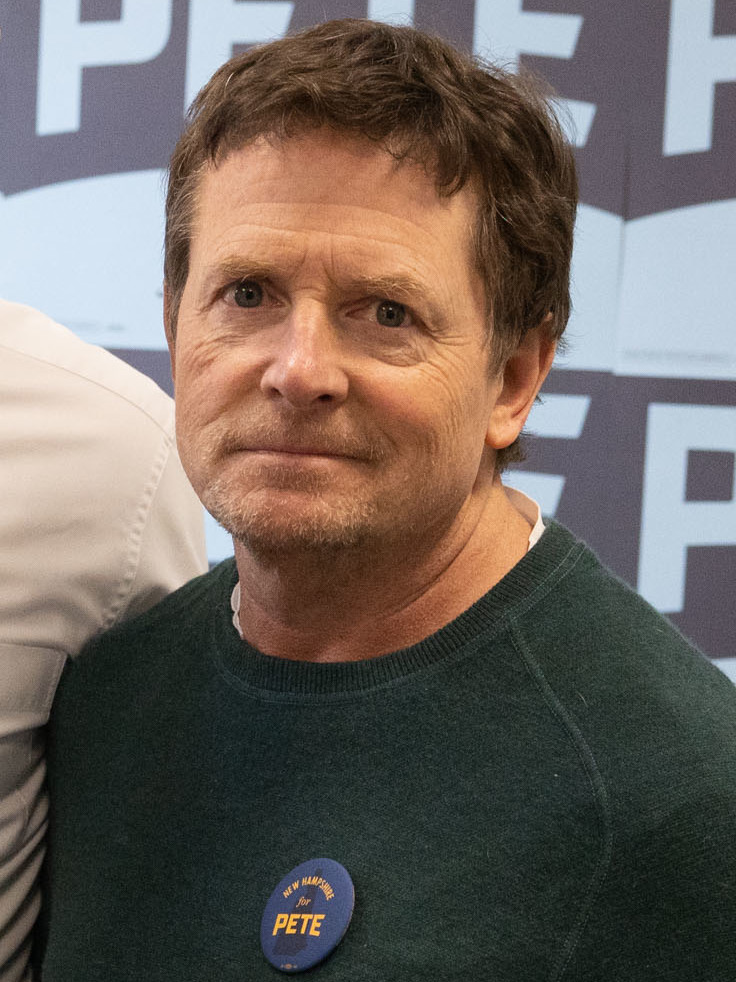
Michael J. Fox won in 2010.

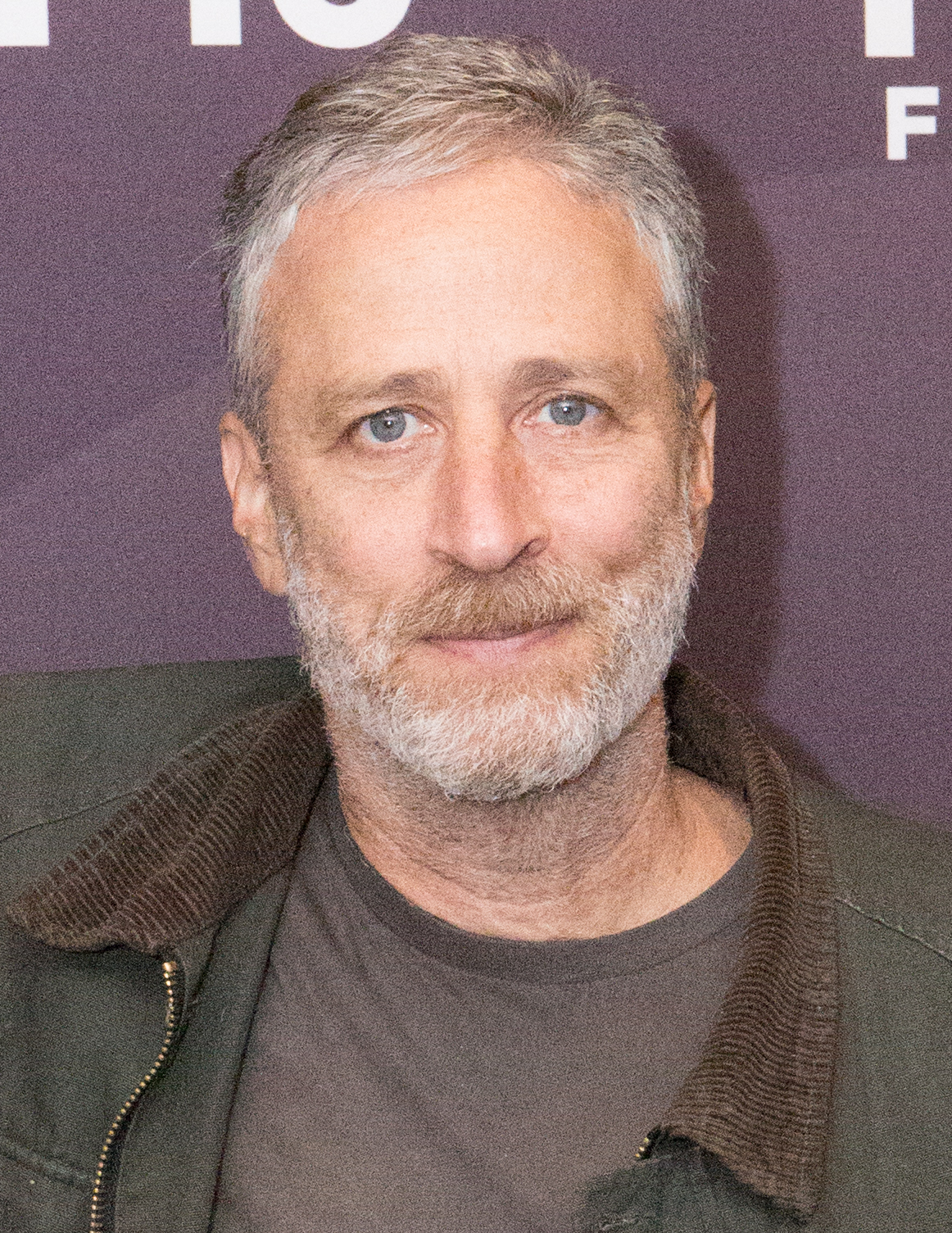
Jon Stewart won the award in 2011.

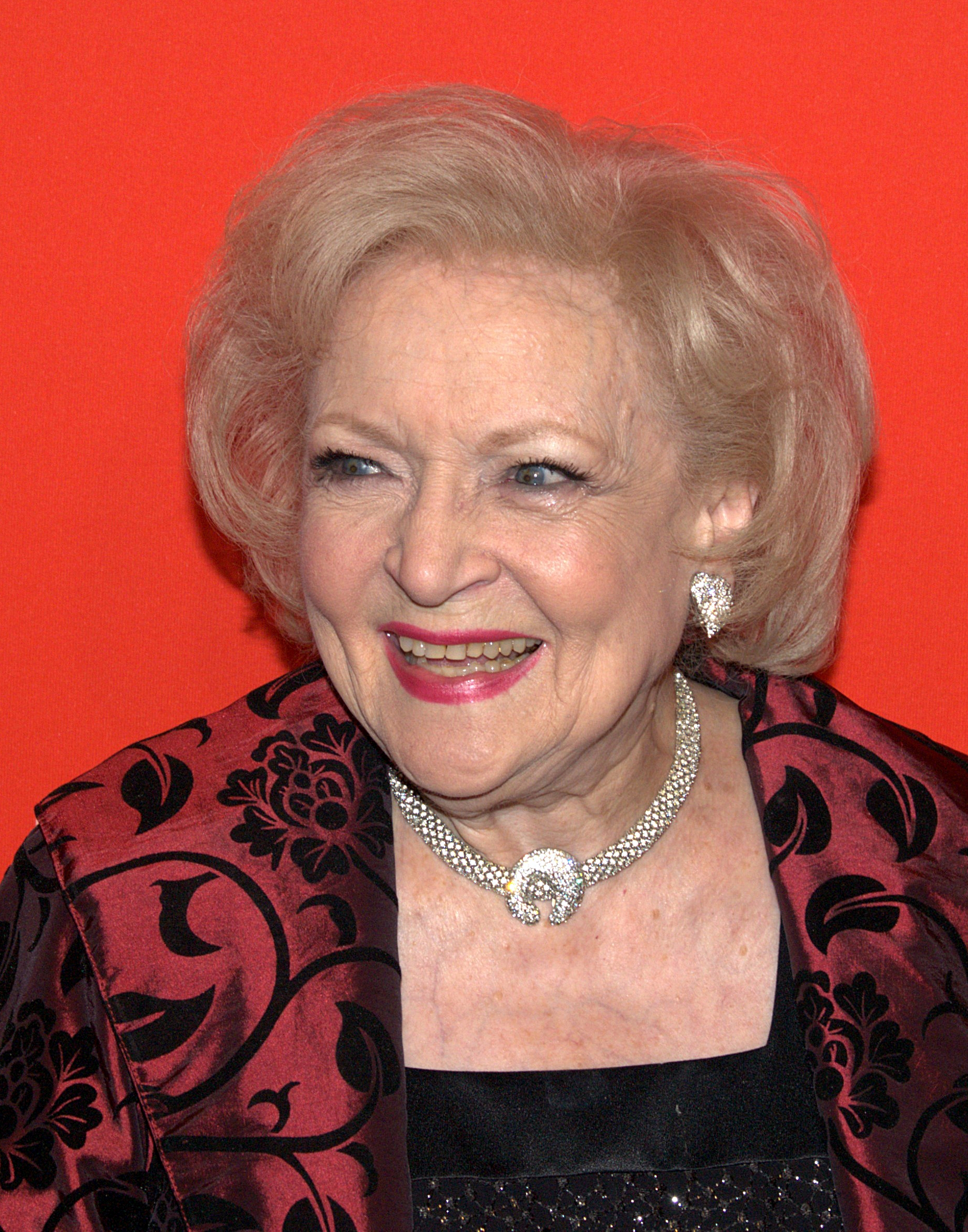
2012 award winner, Betty White.

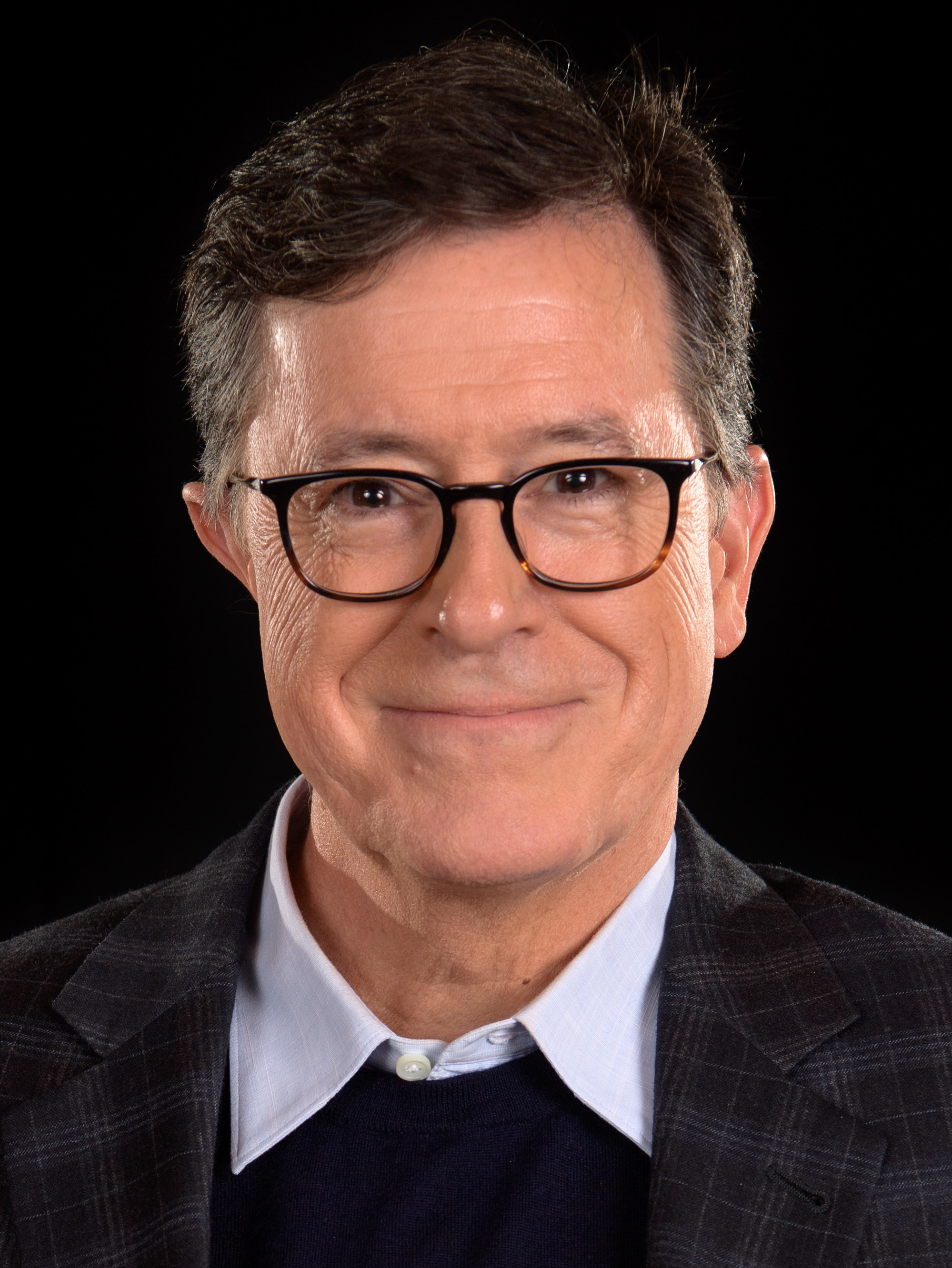
Comedian Stephen Colbert won in 2014.

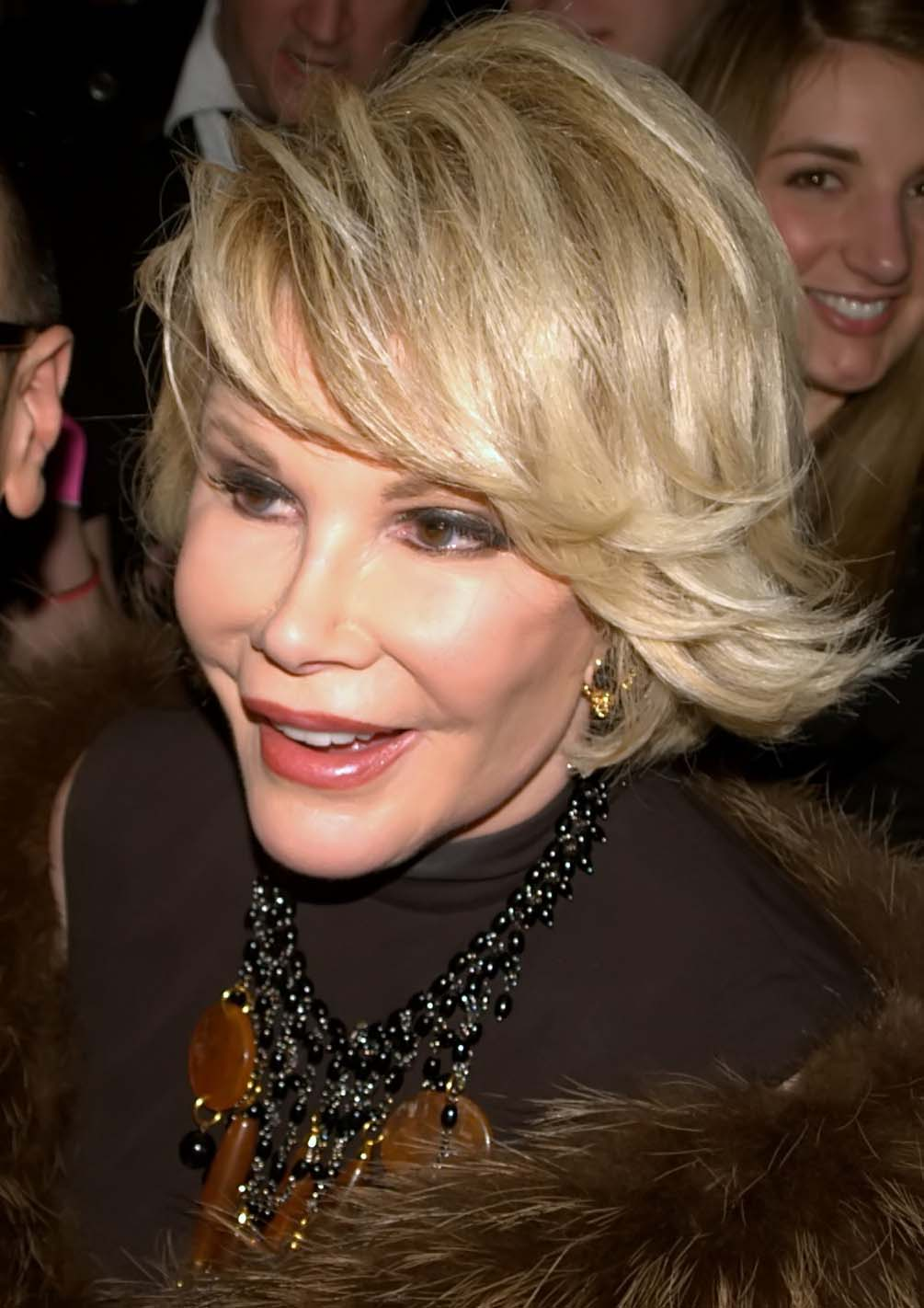
Comedienne Joan Rivers won in 2015.

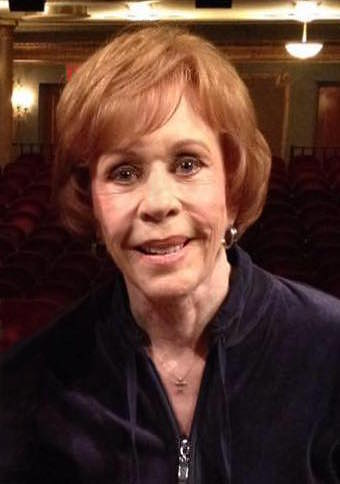
Comedienne Carol Burnett won in 2017.

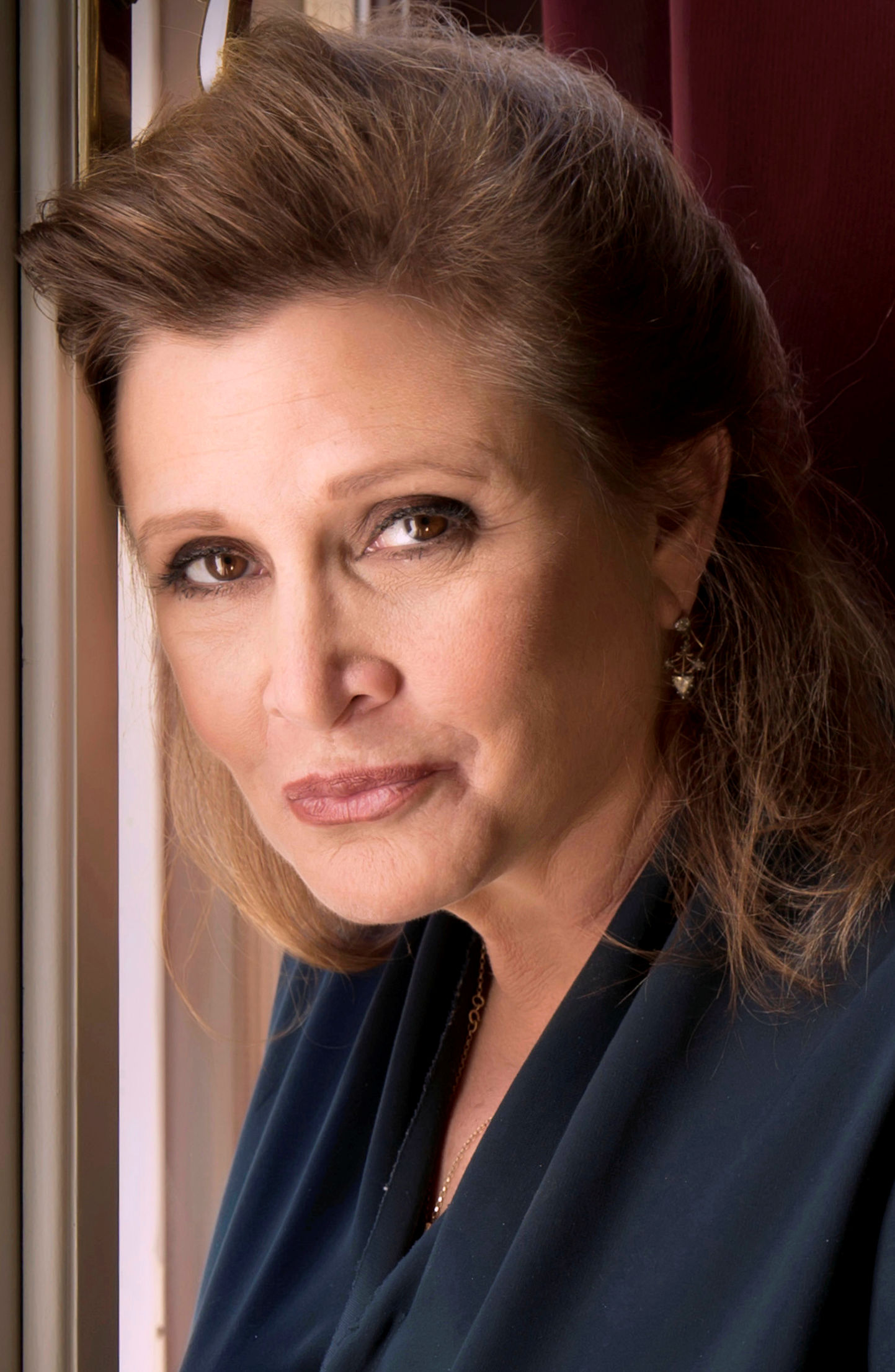
Carrie Fisher won the award in 2018, posthumously.

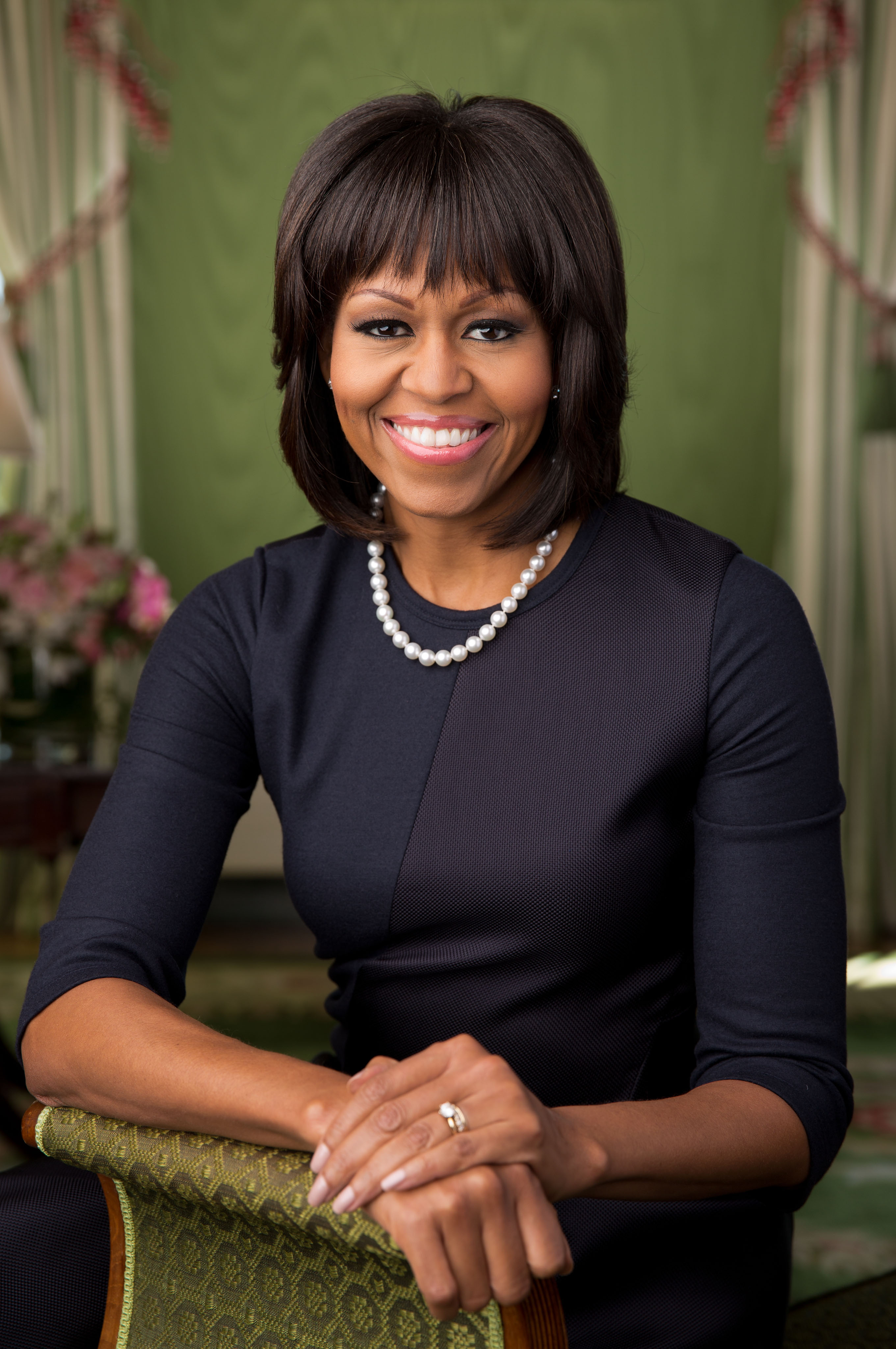
Former First Lady of the United States Michelle Obama won in 2020 and 2024.

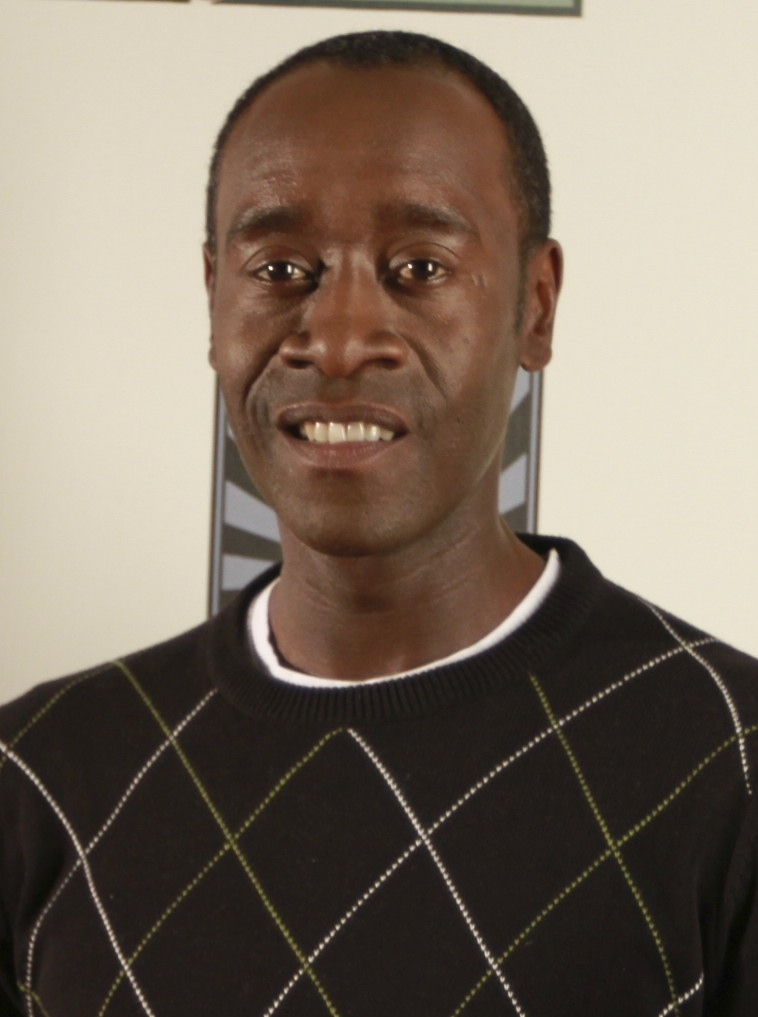
Don Cheadle won for Carry On: Reflections for a New Generation from John Lewis in 2022.

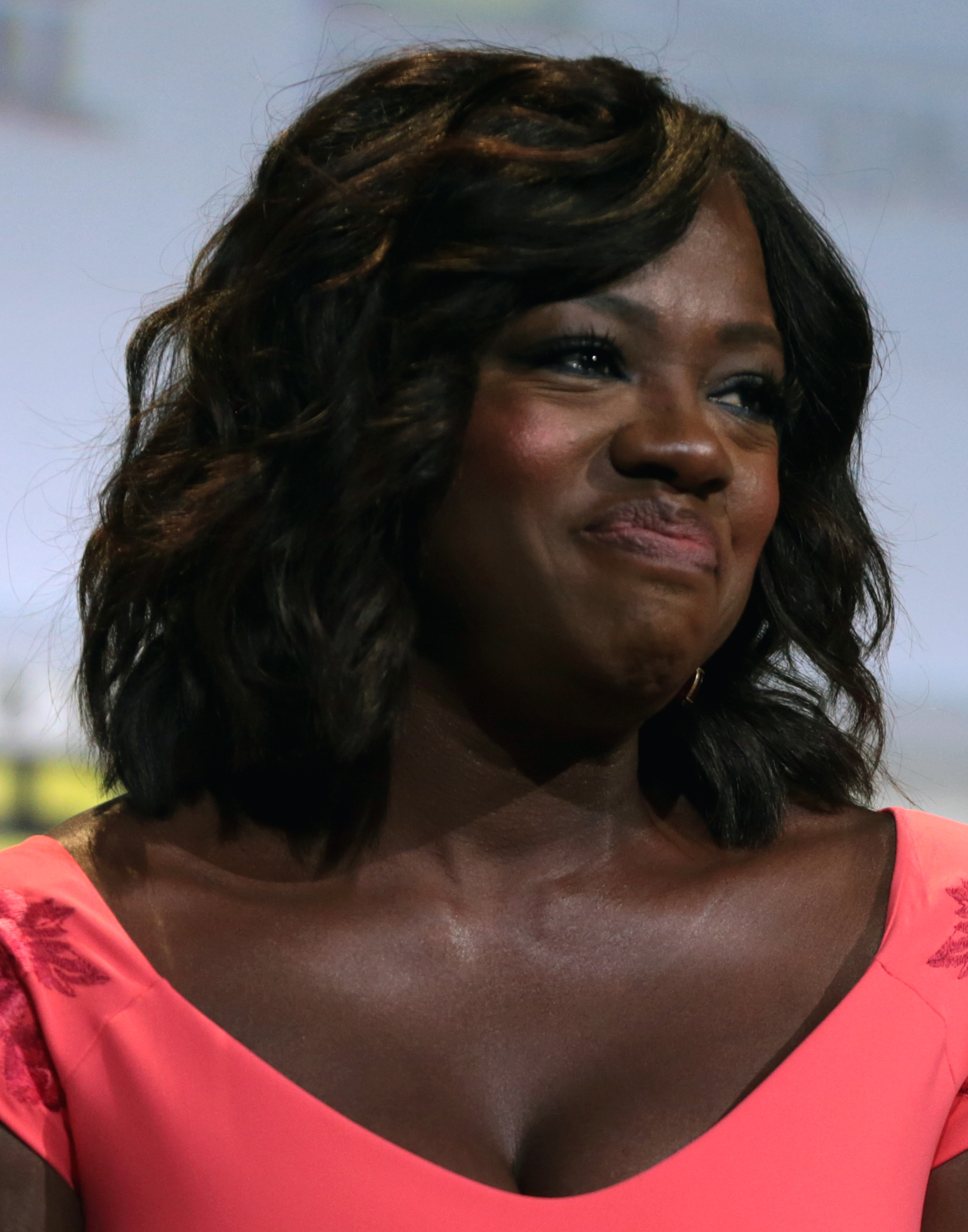
Viola Davis won the award in 2023 achieving the EGOT.

=== 1950s ===
Year^{[I]}	Work	Performing Artist
1959	The Best of the Stan Freberg Shows	Stan Freberg
1959	Great American Speeches	Melvyn Douglas, Vincent Price, Carl Sandburg and Ed Begley
1959	"Green Christmas"	Stan Freberg
1959	Improvisations to Music	Elaine May and Mike Nichols

=== 1960s ===
Year^{[I]}	Work	Performing Artist
1960	A Lincoln Portrait	Carl Sandburg
1960	Ages of Man	John Gielgud
1960	Basil Rathbone Reads Sherlock Holmes	Basil Rathbone
1960	Mark Twain Tonight!	Hal Holbrook
1960	New York Taxi Driver	Tony Schwartz
1961
1961	FDR Speaks	Robert Bialek (producer)
1961	Ages of Man, Vol. 2 (One Man in His Time)	John Gielgud
1961	J.B.	Archibald MacLeish
1961	Voices of the Twentieth Century	Henry Fonda
1962	Humor in Music	Leonard Bernstein
1962	The Coming of Christ	Alexander Scourby
1962	More of Hal Holbrook in Mark Twain Tonight!	Hal Holbrook
1962	Wisdom, Vol. 1	Carl Sandburg, Harlow Shapley, Jawaharlal Nehru and Jacques Lipchitz
1962	The World of Dorothy Parker	Dorothy Parker
1963	The Story-Teller ... A Session with Charles Laughton	Charles Laughton
1963	Carl Sandburg Reading His Poetry	Carl Sandburg
1963	Enoch Arden	Claude Rains and Glenn Gould
1963	"Mama Sang a Song"	Stan Kenton
1963	This Is My Beloved	Laurence Harvey
1964	Who's Afraid of Virginia Woolf?	Melinda Dillon, George Grizzard, Uta Hagen and Arthur Hill
1964	The Badmen	Goddard Lieberson, Pete Seeger and others
1964	Brecht on Brecht	Dane Clark, Anne Jackson, Lotte Lenya and Viveca Lindfors
1964	John F. Kennedy – The Presidential Years	Norman Weiser and David Teig
1964	We Shall Overcome (The March on Washington, August 28, 1963)	Martin Luther King Jr. with Joan Baez, Marian Anderson, Odetta, Rabbi Joachim Prinz and Bob Dylan
1965	BBC Tribute to John F. Kennedy	That Was the Week That Was Cast
1965	Dialogue Highlights from Becket	Richard Burton and Peter O'Toole
1965	Dylan	Alec Guinness and Kate Reid
1965	Hamlet	Richard Burton, Hume Cronyn, John Gielgud, Alfred Drake, George Voskovec, Eileen Herlie, William Redfield and George Ross
1965	The Kennedy Wit	John F. Kennedy, David Brinkley and Adlai Stevenson
1965	Othello	Laurence Olivier
1966	John F. Kennedy: As We Remember Him	Goddard Lieberson, producer
1966	The Brontes	Margaret Webster
1966	Much Ado About Nothing	National Theatre of Great Britain
1966	A Personal Choice	Alec Guinness
1966	A Time to Keep: '64	Chet Huntley and David Brinkley
1966	The Voice of the Uncommon Man	Adlai Stevenson
1967	A Reporter Remembers, Vol. I – The War Years	Edward R. Murrow
1967	Day for Decision	Johnny Sea
1967	Death of a Salesman	Lee J. Cobb and Mildred Dunnock
1967	History Repeats Itself	Buddy Starcher
1968	Gallant Men	Everett Dirksen
1968	The Balcony	Patrick Magee and Cyril Cusack
1968	The Earth	Rod McKuen
1968	A Man For All Seasons	Paul Scofield, Wendy Hiller and Robert Shaw
1968	Mark Twain Tonight!, Vol. 3	Hal Holbrook
1968	"An Open Letter to My Teenage Son"	Victor Lundberg
1968	Poems of James Dickey	James Dickey
1969	Lonesome Cities	Rod McKuen
1969	The Canterbury Pilgrims	Martin Starkie
1969	I Have a Dream	Martin Luther King Jr.
1969	Murder in the Cathedral	Paul Scofield

=== 1970s ===
Year^{[I]}	Work	Performing Artist
1970	We Love You, Call Collect	Art Linkletter and Diane Linkletter
1970	The Great White Hope	James Earl Jones
1970	Man on the Moon	Walter Cronkite
1971	Why I Oppose the War in Vietnam	Martin Luther King Jr.
1971	Poems and Ballads from 100-Plus American Poets	Ambrose, Dryden, Hecht, Molloy, Carawan, La Farge and Seeger
1971	Everett Dirksen's America	Everett Dirksen
1971	Grover Henson Feels Forgotten	Bill Cosby
1971	In the Beginning	Apollo 8, 11 & 12 Astronauts, John F. Kennedy and Richard Nixon
1972	Desiderata	Les Crane
1972	Hamlet (A Hallmark Hall of Fame Presentation)	Richard Chamberlain
1972	I Can Hear It Now/The Sixties	Walter Cronkite
1972	Long Day's Journey Into Night	Stacy Keach, Robert Ryan and Geraldine Fitzgerald
1972	Will Rogers' USA	James Whitmore
1973	Lenny	The Original Broadway Cast
1973	Angela Davis Speaks	Angela Davis
1973	Yevtushenko	Yevgeny Yevtushenko
1973	The Word	Rod McKuen
1974	Jonathan Livingston Seagull	Richard Harris
1974	America, Why I Love Her	John Wayne
1974	Slaughterhouse-Five	Kurt Vonnegut Jr.
1974	Songs and Conversations	Billie Holiday
1974	Tales of Witches, Ghosts and Goblins	Vincent Price
1975	Good Evening	Peter Cook and Dudley Moore
1975	Autumn	Rod McKuen
1975	An Ear to the Sounds of Our History	Eric Sevareid
1975	Senator Sam at Home	Sam Ervin
1976	Give 'em Hell, Harry!	James Whitmore
1976	The Autobiography of Miss Jane Pittman	Claudia McNeil
1976	The Prophet	Richard Harris
1976	Immortal Sherlock Holmes (Mercury Theatre on the Air)	Orson Welles
1976	Talk About America	Alistair Cooke
1976	To Kill a Mockingbird	Maureen Stapleton
1977	Great American Documents	Henry Fonda, Helen Hayes, James Earl Jones and Orson Welles
1977	Fahrenheit 451	Ray Bradbury
1977	Foundation: The Psychohistorians	William Shatner
1977	The Old Man and the Sea	Charlton Heston
1977	A Tale of Two Cities	James Mason
1978	The Belle of Amherst	Julie Harris
1978	Alex Haley Tells the Story of His Search for Roots	Alex Haley
1978	For Colored Girls Who Have Considered Suicide / When the Rainbow Is Enuf	Original Cast and Ntozake Shange
1978	The Silmarillion	Christopher Tolkien
1978	The Truman Tapes	Harry Truman and Ben Gradus
1979	Citizen Kane (Original Motion Picture Soundtrack)	Orson Welles
1979	The Grapes of Wrath	Henry Fonda
1979	The Nixon Interviews with David Frost	Richard Nixon and David Frost
1979	Roots (Original Television Soundtrack)	Various Artists
1979	Wuthering Heights	Judith Anderson, Claire Bloom, James Mason, George Rose and Gordon Gould

=== 1980s ===
Year^{[I]}	Work	Performing Artist
1980	Ages of Man (Readings from Shakespeare)	John Gielgud
1980	An American Prayer	Jim Morrison
1980	Apocalypse Now (Original Motion Picture Soundtrack)	Various Artists
1980	Orson Welles & Helen Hayes at Their Best	Orson Welles and Helen Hayes
1980	The Ox-Bow Incident	Henry Fonda
1980	Stare with Your Ears	Ken Nordine
1981	Gertrude Stein, Gertrude Stein, Gertrude Stein	Pat Carroll
1981	Adventures of Luke Skywalker: The Empire Strikes Back	Original Cast
1981	I Sing Because I'm Happy, Vols. 1 and 2	Mahalia Jackson
1981	James Thurber: A Curb in the Sky and Other Stories	Peter Ustinov
1981	Obediently Yours	Orson Welles
1982	Donovan's Brain	Orson Welles
1982	Justice Holmes: Decisions	E. G. Marshall
1982	The McCartney Interview	Paul McCartney and Vic Garbarini
1982	'Twas the Night Before Christmas (from Christmas with Friends, featuring Ed McMahon, Doc Severinsen and Tommy Newsom)	Ed McMahon
1982	Vladimir Nabokov: Lolita	James Mason
1983	Raiders of the Lost Ark: The Movie on Record	Tom Voegeli
1983	Charles Dickens' Nicholas Nickleby	Roger Rees
1983	Foundation's Edge	Isaac Asimov
1983	No Man's Land	John Gielgud and Ralph Richardson
1983	2010: Odyssey Two	Arthur C. Clarke
1984	Copland: Lincoln Portrait	William Warfield
1984	Everything You Always Wanted to Know About Home Computers	Steve Allen and Jayne Meadows
1984	Jane Fonda's Workout Record for Pregnancy, Birth and Recovery	Jane Fonda and Femmy De Lyser
1984	Old Possum's Book of Practical Cats	John Gielgud and Irene Worth
1985	The Words of Gandhi	Ben Kingsley
1985	Heart Play (Unfinished Dialogue)	John Lennon and Yoko Ono
1985	Our Time Has Come	Jesse Jackson
1985	The Real Thing (Broadway Cast)	Jeremy Irons and Glenn Close
1986	Ma Rainey's Black Bottom	Mike Berniker (producer) and the Broadway Cast
1986	The Adventures of Huckleberry Finn	Dick Cavett
1986	Catch-22	Alan Arkin
1986	The Spy Who Came in from the Cold	John le Carré
1986	Zuckerman Bound	Philip Roth
1987	Interviews from the Class of '55 Recording Sessions	Johnny Cash, Jerry Lee Lewis, Chips Moman, Ricky Nelson, Roy Orbison, Carl Perkins and Sam Phillips
1987	Gulliver (composed by Patrick Williams)	John Gielgud
1987	Hardheaded Boys	Bill Cosby
1987	Interview with the Vampire	F. Murray Abraham
1987	The Stories of Ray Bradbury	Ray Bradbury
1988	Lake Wobegon Days	Garrison Keillor
1988	Lauren Bacall by Myself	Lauren Bacall
1988	"Lincoln Portrait" (from Aaron Copland: Lincoln Portrait)	Katharine Hepburn
1988	Star Trek IV: The Voyage Home	Leonard Nimoy and George Takei
1988	Whales Alive	Leonard Nimoy
1989	"Speech by Rev. Jesse Jackson, July 27" (from One Lord, One Faith, One Baptism)	Jesse Jackson
1989	A Christmas Carol	John Gielgud
1989	A Prairie Home Companion: The 2nd Annual Farewell Performance	Garrison Keillor and Various Artists
1989	The Screwtape Letters	John Cleese
1989	Winters' Tale	Jonathan Winters

=== 1990s ===
Year^{[I]}	Work	Performing Artist
1990	It's Always Something	Gilda Radner
1990	All I Really Need to Know I Learned in Kindergarten	Robert Fulghum
1990	I Want to Grow Hair, I Want to Grow Up, I Want to Go to Boise	Erma Bombeck
1990	Sir John Gielgud Reads Alice in Wonderland	John Gielgud
1990	The War of the Worlds 50th Anniversary Production	Jason Robards, Steve Allen, Douglas Edwards and Cast
1991	Gracie: A Love Story	George Burns
1991	"Diane..." The Twin Peaks Tapes of Agent Cooper	Kyle MacLachlan
1991	Jimmy Stewart and His Poems	Jimmy Stewart
1991	A Prairie Home Companion: The 4th Annual Farewell Performance	Garrison Keillor
1991	Profiles in Courage	John F. Kennedy Jr.
1992	The Civil War	Ken Burns
1992	The Hitchhiker's Guide to the Galaxy	Douglas Adams
1992	A Life on the Road	Charles Kuralt
1992	Me: Stories of My Life	Katharine Hepburn
1993	What You Can Do to Avoid AIDS	Magic Johnson and Robert O'Keefe
1993	A Christmas Carol	Patrick Stewart
1993	Devout Catalyst	Ken Nordine
1993	Fried Green Tomatoes at the Whistle Stop Cafe	Fannie Flagg
1993	Stories	Garrison Keillor
1993	This Is Orson Welles	Orson Welles and Peter Bogdanovich
1994	On the Pulse of Morning	Maya Angelou
1994	Bound for Glory	Arlo Guthrie
1994	Howards End	Emma Thompson
1994	Miles: The Autobiography	Levar Burton
1994	Mr. and Mrs. Bridge	Paul Newman and Joanne Woodward
1995	Get in the Van: On the Road with Black Flag	Henry Rollins
1995	Baseball	Ken Burns
1995	The Bible (The New Testament)	Gregory Peck
1995	Hamlet	Kenneth Branagh and the Renaissance Theatre Company
1995	Schindler's List	Ben Kingsley
1996	Phenomenal Woman	Maya Angelou
1996	Guy Noir: Radio Private Eye	Garrison Keillor
1996	I Am Spock	Leonard Nimoy
1996	Long Walk to Freedom	Danny Glover
1997	It Takes a Village	Hillary Clinton
1997	The Adventures of Huckleberry Finn	Garrison Keillor
1997	Charles Kuralt's America	Charles Kuralt
1997	Grow Old Along with Me, the Best Is Yet to Be	Ed Asner, Ellen Burstyn, CCH Pounder and Alfre Woodard
1997	Harry S Truman: A Journey to Independence	Lauren Bacall, Martin Landau, Jack Lemmon and Gregory Peck
1998	Charles Kuralt's Spring	Charles Kuralt
1998	Contact	Jodie Foster
1998	Even the Stars Look Lonesome	Maya Angelou
1998	Living Faith	Jimmy Carter
1998	A Reporter's Life	Walter Cronkite
1999	Still Me	Christopher Reeve
1999	Beloved	Toni Morrison
1999	Spiders in the Hairdo: Modern Urban Legends	David Holt and Bill Mooney
1999	The Virtues of Aging	Jimmy Carter
1999	Wobegon Boy	Garrison Keillor

=== 2000s ===
Year^{[I]}	Work	Performing Artist
2000	The Autobiography of Martin Luther King Jr.	LeVar Burton
2000	The Chieftains: The Authorized Biography	Nanci Griffith
2000	The Diaries of Adam & Eve: Translated by Mark Twain	Mandy Patinkin and Betty Buckley with Walter Cronkite
2000	Merle Haggard's My House of Memories	Merle Haggard
2000	'Tis	Frank McCourt
2001	The Measure of a Man	Sidney Poitier
2001	The Complete Shakespeare Sonnets	Various artists including Kathleen Turner, Patrick Stewart and Al Pacino
2001	Married to Laughter: A Love Story	Jerry Stiller and Anne Meara
2001	On the Road	Matt Dillon
2001	Shopgirl	Steve Martin
2002	Q: The Autobiography of Quincy Jones	Quincy Jones
2002	An Hour Before Daylight	Jimmy Carter
2002	Lake Wobegon Summer 1956	Garrison Keillor
2002	Letters from the Earth: Uncensored Writings by Mark Twain	Carl Reiner
2002	War Letters: Extraordinary Correspondence from American Wars	Various artists including Rob Lowe, Noah Wyle, Joan Allen, Tom Brokaw and narrator Harry Smith
2003	A Song Flung Up to Heaven	Maya Angelou
2003	The Great Gatsby	Tim Robbins
2003	The Kid Stays in the Picture	Robert Evans
2003	Lucky Man	Michael J. Fox
2003	Nothing Is Impossible	Christopher Reeve
2004	Lies and the Lying Liars Who Tell Them	Al Franken
2004	Fear Itself	Don Cheadle
2004	Living History	Hillary Clinton
2004	The Nikki Giovanni Poetry Collection	Nikki Giovanni
2004	When You Ride Alone You Ride with bin Laden	Bill Maher
2005	My Life	Bill Clinton
2005	Dress Your Family in Corduroy and Denim	David Sedaris
2005	Live & Kickin' at the National Storytelling Festival	David Holt and Zeb Holt
2005	The Pleasure of My Company	Steve Martin
2005	The World According to Mr. Rogers	Tyne Daly, John Lithgow, Joanne Rogers, Lily Tomlin and André Watts
2006	Dreams from My Father	Barack Obama
2006	The Adventures of Guy Noir	Garrison Keillor
2006	The Al Franken Show Party Album	Al Franken
2006	Chronicles: Volume One	Sean Penn
2006	When Will Jesus Bring the Pork Chops?	George Carlin
2007	Ossie and Ruby (TIE)	Ossie Davis and Ruby Dee
2007	Our Endangered Values (TIE)	Jimmy Carter
2007	I Shouldn't Even Be Doing This!	Bob Newhart
2007	New Rules: Polite Musings from a Timid Observer	Bill Maher
2007	The Truth (with Jokes)	Al Franken
2008	The Audacity of Hope	Barack Obama
2008	Celebrations	Maya Angelou
2008	Giving	Bill Clinton
2008	Sunday Mornings in Plains	Jimmy Carter
2008	Things I Overheard While Talking to Myself	Alan Alda
2009	An Inconvenient Truth	Beau Bridges, Cynthia Nixon and Blair Underwood
2009	Born Standing Up	Steve Martin
2009	I Am America (and So Can You!)	Stephen Colbert and The Colbert Report Cast
2009	Life Beyond Measure	Sidney Poitier
2009	When You Are Engulfed in Flames	David Sedaris

=== 2010s ===
Year^{[I]}	Work	Performing Artist|-
2010	Always Looking Up	Michael J. Fox
2010	Dashiell Hammett's The Maltese Falcon	Yuri Rasovsky and Josh Stanton
2010	The Lincoln–Douglas Debates	Richard Dreyfuss and David Strathairn
2010	A Very Special Time	Jonathan Winters
2010	We Can Have Peace in the Holy Land	Jimmy Carter
2010	Wishful Drinking	Carrie Fisher
2011	Earth (The Audiobook)	Jon Stewart and The Daily Show Staff
2011	American on Purpose	Craig Ferguson
2011	The Bedwetter	Sarah Silverman
2011	A Funny Thing Happened on the Way to the Future	Michael J. Fox
2011	This Time Together	Carol Burnett
2011	The Woody Allen Collection: Mere Anarchy, Side Effects, Without Feathers, Getting Even	Woody Allen
2012	If You Ask Me (and of Course You Won't)	Betty White
2012	Bossypants	Tina Fey
2012	Fab Fan Memories: The Beatles Bond	Nathan Burbank, Bryan Cumming, Dennis Scott and David Toledo
2012	Hamlet	Dan Donohue and the Oregon Shakespeare Festival Cast
2012	The Mark of Zorro	Val Kilmer and the Hollywood Theater of the Ear Cast
2013	Society's Child	Janis Ian
2013	American Grown	Scott Creswell and Dan Zitt, producers
2013	Back to Work	Bill Clinton
2013	Drift	Rachel Maddow
2013	Seriously... I'm Kidding	Ellen DeGeneres
2014	America Again: Re-becoming The Greatness We Never Weren't	Stephen Colbert
2014	Carrie and Me	Carol Burnett
2014	Let's Explore Diabetes with Owls	David Sedaris
2014	Still Foolin' Em	Billy Crystal
2014	The Storm King	Pete Seeger
2015	Diary of a Mad Diva	Joan Rivers (posthumous)
2015	Actors Anonymous	James Franco
2015	A Call to Action: Women, Religion, Violence, and Power	Jimmy Carter
2015	Carsick: John Waters Hitchhikes Across America	John Waters
2015	A Fighting Chance	Elizabeth Warren
2015	We Will Survive: True Stories of Encouragement, Inspiration and the Power of Song	Gloria Gaynor
2016	A Full Life: Reflections at 90	Jimmy Carter
2016	Blood on Snow	Patti Smith
2016	Brief Encounters: Conversations, Magic Moments and Assorted Hijinks	Dick Cavett
2016	Patience and Sarah	Janis Ian and Jean Smart
2016	Yes Please	Amy Poehler
2017	In Such Good Company: Eleven Years of Laughter, Mayhem, and Fun in the Sandbox	Carol Burnett
2017	The Girl with the Lower Back Tattoo	Amy Schumer
2017	M Train	Patti Smith
2017	Under the Big Black Sun: A Personal History of L.A. Punk	Various Artists
2017	Unfaithful Music & Disappearing Ink	Elvis Costello
2018
2018	The Princess Diarist	Carrie Fisher (posthumous)
2018	Astrophysics for People in a Hurry	Neil deGrasse Tyson
2018	Born to Run	Bruce Springsteen
2018	Confessions of a Serial Songwriter	Shelly Peiken
2018	Our Revolution: A Future to Believe In	Bernie Sanders and Mark Ruffalo
2019	Faith: A Journey for All	Jimmy Carter
2019	Accessory to War	Courtney B. Vance
2019	Calypso	David Sedaris
2019	Creative Quest	Questlove
2019	The Last Black Unicorn	Tiffany Haddish

=== 2020s ===
Year^{[I]}	Work	Performing Artist
2020	Becoming	Michelle Obama
2020	The Beastie Boys Book	Michael Diamond, Adam Horovitz, Scott Sherratt and Dan Zitt (producers)
2020	Catatonia: 20 Years as a Two-Time Cancer Survivor	Eric Alexandrakis
2020	Mr. Know-It-All	John Waters
2020	Sekou Andrews & the String Theory	Sekou Andrews and the String Theory
2021	Blowout	Rachel Maddow
2021	Acid for the Children: A Memoir	Flea
2021	Alex Trebek — The Answer Is...	Ken Jennings
2021	Catch and Kill	Ronan Farrow
2021	Charlotte's Web	Meryl Streep and Full Cast
2022	Carry On: Reflections for a New Generation from John Lewis	Don Cheadle
2022	Aftermath	LeVar Burton
2022	Catching Dreams: Live at Fort Knox Chicago	J. Ivy
2022	8:46	Dave Chappelle and Amir Sulaiman
2022	A Promised Land	Barack Obama
2023	Finding Me	Viola Davis
2023	Act Like You Got Some Sense	Jamie Foxx
2023	All About Me!: My Remarkable Life in Show Business	Mel Brooks
2023	Aristotle and Dante Dive into the Waters of the World	Lin-Manuel Miranda
2023	Music Is History	Questlove
2024	The Light We Carry: Overcoming in Uncertain Times	Michelle Obama
2024	Big Tree	Meryl Streep
2024	Boldly Go: Reflections on a Life of Awe and Wonder	William Shatner
2024	The Creative Act: A Way of Being	Rick Rubin
2024	It's OK to Be Angry About Capitalism	Bernie Sanders
2025	Last Sunday in Plains: A Centennial Celebration	Jimmy Carter (posthumous)
2025	All You Need Is Love: The Beatles in Their Own Words	Guy Oldfield
2025	...And Your Ass Will Follow	George Clinton
2025	Behind the Seams: My Life in Rhinestones	Dolly Parton
2025	My Name Is Barbra	Barbra Streisand
2026	Meditations: The Reflections of His Holiness The Dalai Lama	The Dalai Lama
2026	Elvis, Rocky & Me: The Carol Connors Story	Kathy Garver
2026	Into the Uncut Grass	Trevor Noah
2026	Lovely One: A Memoir	Ketanji Brown Jackson
2026	You Know It's True: The Real Story of Milli Vanilli	Fab Morvan
2027	Future Boy	Michael J. Fox
2027	The Look	Michelle Obama
2027	The Man on the Run	Paul McCartney and Morgan Neville
2027	Remix Meditation	Lil Jon
2027	Star of the Show: My Life on Stage	Dolly Parton
2027	Vagabond: A Memoir	Tim Curry

== Multiple wins & nominations ==
The following individuals received two or more awards:

Wins	Person
4	Jimmy Carter
3	Maya Angelou
2	Barack Obama
2	Michelle Obama
2	Orson Welles

The following individuals received three or more nominations:

Nominations	Person
10	Jimmy Carter
8	John Gielgud
7	Orson Welles
5	Maya Angelou
4	Walter Cronkite
4	Michael J. Fox
3	Carol Burnett
3	Barack Obama
3	Michelle Obama
3	James Earl Jones
3	James Mason

== See also ==
- Grammy Award for Best Spoken Word Album for Children
