= The Story-Teller ... A Session with Charles Laughton =

Studio album by Charles Laughton
- Released: January 1962
- Genre: Spoken word
- Label: Capitol
- Producer: Bill Miller

The Story-Teller ... A Session with Charles Laughton is a spoken word double album by Charles Laughton. The material was recorded in 1955 as part of Laughton's one-man shows, but it was not released until January 1962. The double album was produced by Bill Miller and issued by Capitol Records (catalog number TBO 1650). Laughton died in December 1962 and, in May 1963, posthumously received the Grammy Award for Best Spoken Word Album for the album.

== Track listing ==
Side A

1. Introduction to Act I, including the Goldsteins and Margaret O'Brien stories (4:23)
2. Poetry: The Rabbit - The Horse (1:26)
3. From The Dharma Bums by Jack Kerouac (3:52)
4. Henry Moore (2:08)
5. Chartres Cathedral story (8:54)
6. Psalm 104 (2:58)

Side B

1. From Julius Caesar by Shakespeare (19:39)

Side C

1. Introduction to Act II, including green elephants and moon space-suit stories (2:15)
2. Shaw's aphorisms (0:37)
3. From Major Barbara by George Bernard Shaw (12:24)
4. From The Phaedrus by Plato (translated by Christopher Isherwood) (9:02)

Side D

1. The Fiery Furnace (8:58)
2. Carl Milles letter (9:23)
3. Waculla Springs story (6:11)
