= Our Endangered Values =

Book by Jimmy Carter

- Author: Jimmy Carter
- Language: English
- Publication date: 2005
- Publication place: United States

Our Endangered Values: America's Moral Crisis is a book written by Jimmy Carter. On January 15, 2006 it was listed at #1 on The New York Times Non-Fiction Best Seller list.

Carter won the Grammy Award for Best Spoken Word Album for the spoken word production of this book, tying with Ruby Dee and Ossie Davis.
