= Wisdom (TV series) =

Title card for Wisdom, c. 1957

Wisdom is a television series of half-hour interviews conducted by the NBC between 1957 and 1965. The series featured interviews with distinguished guests who were notable experts in the arts, physical and social sciences and in politics at the time. The series has not aired in the last 50 years and appears to have not been released for home video, but does remain accessible through a multitude of databases including the Library of American Broadcasting through several universities in the United States and around the world.
