= Kimaris =

66th demon of the first part of the Lemegeton

Seal of Kimaris (Ars Goetia)

Kimaris, also known by the alternate names Cimeies, Cimejes and Cimeries, is most widely known as the 66th demon of the first part of the Lemegeton (popularly known as the Ars Goetia).

== Description ==
He is described in the Lemegeton as a godly warrior riding a black horse, and possesses the abilities of locating lost or hidden treasures, teaching trivium (grammar, logic and rhetoric) and making a man into a warrior of his own likeness. He holds the rank of marquis, and is served by 20 legions. Much the same description is found in the earlier text of Johann Weyer's catalog of demons, Pseudomonarchia Daemonum (published 1563). Earlier still is the Munich Handbook of Necromancy (Clm 849) which lists an entity named Tuvries with much the same characteristics, except that he has 30 legions of servitors, and can cause a person to cross seas and rivers quickly.

== Modern occultism ==
In 777 (1909), Aleister Crowley transliterates Kimaris into Hebrew as KYMAVR (כימאור, with a gematria value of 277) and assigns the entity to the third decan of Capricorn by night, corresponding to the Four of Disks in the tarot. In the Qabalistic lexicon Sepher Sephiroth (1912), the name is alternatively rendered as KYTzAVR (כיצאור), yielding a value of 327.

In The Satanic Bible (1969), Anton LaVey included the variant spelling "Cimeries" in his list of "infernal names", identifying the entity with an unverified folkloric description as a rider of a black horse who rules over Africa.

== Other References ==
In British Library Harley MS 6482, entitled "The Rosie Crucian Secrets", Thomas Rudd lists Cimeries as the 26th spirit made use of by King Solomon. He also attributes an angel Cimeriel to one of Dee's Enochian Ensigns of Creation, the tablet of 24 mansions. The earliest mention of Chamariel is in Rossi's Gnostic tractate. It is probable that the earliest mention of Kimaris is also Coptic, found in the London oriental mss 6796 where the name "Akathama Chamaris" appears. In this text, the entity in question does not appear to be evil; rather, he is addressed as a godlike helping spirit.

== Derivation of the name ==
Wade Baskin's Dictionary of Satanism speculates that Cimeries is derived from Cimmerians, a warlike people mentioned in the works of several classical authors as dwelling totally in darkness.

== In popular culture ==
- In the anime series Mobile Suit Gundam: Iron-Blooded Orphans, a prominent mobile suit is known as "ASW-G-66 Gundam Kimaris".
- In the book Carl's Doomsday Scenario, the second installment of the sci-fi/fantasy series Dungeon Crawler Carl by Matt Dinniman, the eponymous character, Carl, obtains a plush doll bearing the name and likeness of Kimaris.
- In the anime and manga series Welcome to Demon School! Iruma-kun, there is a student council member named Kimaris Quichelight based on the demon of the same name.

== See also ==
- The Lesser Key of Solomon
- Chimera (mythology)

== Sources ==
- S. L. MacGregor Mathers, A. Crowley, The Goetia: The Lesser Key of Solomon the King (1904). 1995 reprint: ISBN 0-87728-847-X.
