= Operation Bounce House =

2026 novel by Matt Dinniman

- First edition hardback cover
- Author: Matt Dinniman
- Audio read by: Travis Baldree; Jeff Hays
- Language: English
- Genre: Science fiction
- Publisher: Ace Books
- Publication date: 2026
- Media type: Print (hardback), ebook, audiobook
- Pages: 448 pages
- ISBN: 0593820304 First edition hardback

Operation Bounce House is a 2026 science-fiction novel by American author Matt Dinniman. A standalone novel, the book was published through Ace Books and centers upon a group of colonists who must defend their home against a plot to eradicate them from the planet.

== Synopsis ==
The novel follows Oliver Lewis, a young man who lives on New Sonora with his sister Lulu. Centuries prior his grandparents, along with several others, left Earth in hopes of establishing a new life. The planet was largely hospitable to human life, but did require the colonists to undergo some necessary medical changes in order to survive the differences between Earth and New Sonora. After landing, the colonists began settling the planet with the help of "honeybees," construction robots later repurposed for agricultural use. Additionally, they begin to construct a transfer gate that would allow instant travel between the two planets. The colonists began to have children and things seemed to be going well until their children developed a strange, deadly disease that only appeared once they reached adulthood. This disease was even more deadly for the third generation offspring, who would live for only a few years before dying. The colonists were unable to cure the disease, but were able to prevent future offspring from contracting the illness by way of genetic modification. This allowed the remaining second generation to have healthy children such as Oliver and Lulu before dying.

Now an adult himself, Oliver spends his time focusing on improving his farm and ensuring that his family's honeybees continue to function. Theirs is the only farm to have them, as his grandfather had turned off a kill switch inside the robots' programming that would have only allowed them to operate for about 5 years. The honeybees are led by Roger, a hive queen that had also served as a nanny and educator to the Lewis children. The presence of a kill switch, along with several other factors, have caused some of the New Sonorans to distrust Earth's intentions. This proves to be the case, as Oliver and the others soon discover that a powerful Earthside company has dispatched several mech units to New Sonora as part of a game, where paying customers can eradicate "terrorists" and free the planet. In reality, the customers are killing unarmed civilians, as the company wants to eradicate all colonists so they can claim the planet for themselves.

== Development ==
Dinniman wrote Operation Bounce House while also writing the eighth entry in the Dungeon Crawler Carl series, which he said was a new experience for him and that it proved to be difficult. He came up with the idea for the novel while playing Call of Duty online and experiencing heckling from other players, making him realize that online anonymity made it easier for people to "be a terrible person" and act negatively. Dinniman also wanted to incorporate the topic of generative AI intelligence and corporations, specifically humanity's response to such technology.

Unlike with his Dungeon Crawler Carl series, Dinniman was unable to solicit feedback from his fanbase, a process that he stated terrified him as he wanted to prove he could do more than just write work set within that series.

== Release ==
Operation Bounce House was released to hardback and e-book formats in the United States on February 10, 2026, through Ace Books. An audiobook version narrated by Travis Baldree and Jeff Hays was simultaneously released through Penguin Audio.

== Reception ==
Critical reception for Operation Bounce House has been favorable, with Paul Di Filippo comparing it favorably to Robert Heinlein's The Moon is a Harsh Mistress. SciFiNow was similarly favorable, noting that novel refreshes the familiar science-fiction trope of "farmers to fighters" by "gradually revealing how even righteous resistance can slide into ethically murky territory."

It won the 2026 Dragon Award for Best Science Fiction Novel.
