= He Who Fights With Monsters =

Australian fantasy book series

He Who Fights with Monsters
- Author: Travis Deverell a.k.a. Shirtaloon
- Country: Australia
- Language: English
- Genre: Isekai; LitRPG
- Publisher: Aethon Books
- Published: 9 March 2021 – present
- Media type: Print; Digital; Audiobook
- No. of books: 13
- Website: hewhofightswithmonsters.com

He Who Fights with Monsters is an Isekai and LitRPG progression fantasy book series by Australian author Travis Deverell who uses the pen name of Shirtaloon. SciFiNow described the series as following Jason, an office supplies store manager, who accidentally enters a magical world.

In 2025, The Beat reported that He Who Fights with Monsters had sold "many millions of units" across ebooks and audiobooks, making it one of the genre's most commercially successful series. The 2026 reissue of He Who Fights with Monsters, Book 1: Outworlder by Aethon Books reached #12 on The New York Times Best Seller List and #7 on the Publishers Weekly Bestseller list.

== Plot summary ==
The series centers on Jason Asano, who wakes in the world of Pallimustus without explanation and must adapt to a dangerous society shaped by magic, monsters, adventurers, nobles, cultists, and gods. Jason gains access to a progression system that combines LitRPG mechanics with cultivation-style advancement, giving him unusual abilities that contrast with his self-image as a would-be hero. The story is known for blending action, humor, political intrigue, slice-of-life moments, and long-form character development.

=== Main characters ===
- Jason Asano is an Australian man transported to Pallimustus, where he becomes an adventurer with unusual, often sinister-themed magical powers.
- Farrah Hurin is a skilled adventurer who helps introduce Jason to the world's magical and social systems.
- Rufus Remore is a noble-born adventurer who becomes one of Jason's early teachers and companions.
- Gary Xandier is a loyal and powerful leonid adventurer known for his strength, warmth, and close friendship with Jason's group.
- Humphrey Geller is an earnest adventurer from a respected aristocratic family who becomes part of Jason's core team.
- Sophie Wexler is a former thief, captive and martial artist whose story becomes closely linked with Jason's team.
- Clive Standish is a magic specialist and researcher whose knowledge supports the team's understanding of essences, rituals, and magical theory.
- Neil Davone is an elven priest and healer whose practical skills and dry humour make him a key member of the group.
- Belinda Callahan is a resourceful member of Jason's wider team, known for her practical skills, adaptability, and close connection to Sophie Wexler.

== Publication history ==
In July 2019, Travis Deverell first began releasing He Who Fights with Monsters as an online serial on Royal Road under the pen name Shirtaloon. After an early review was featured on Royal Road's front page, the series' readership grew to several thousand, leading Deverell to set up an accompanying Patreon account. The work has subsequently moved into commercial ebook, print, and audiobook editions. In a Royal Road interview, Deverell described the transition as part of a wider “LitRPG gold rush,” noting that Podium initially approached him for audiobooks and that Aethon Books became involved for ebook publication. He Who Fights With Monsters has been compared with other icons of the genre like Dungeon Crawler Carl by Matt Dinniman.

Aethon Books began releasing He Who Fights With Monsters in paperback in 2021, and in 2026 began a hardback reissue.

=== Books ===
No.	Title	Date
1	He Who Fights with Monsters	2021
Jason Asano wakes naked and alone in a mysterious world filled with magic, monsters, cultists, cannibals, and adventurers. Formerly a middle manager in an office-supplies store, he must quickly learn how this new reality works, including its essence-based progression system and dangerous social order. Jason tries to act heroically, but his powers appear sinister, forcing him to reconcile good intentions with intimidating abilities. With wit, courage, and unexpected allies, he begins surviving threats far beyond anything from his old life. The first book establishes the series’ humour, isekai premise, LitRPG mechanics, and Jason’s uneasy path from outsider to adventurer.
2	He Who Fights with Monsters 2	2021
Jason settles into adventuring life in Greenstone, as a contest draws elite young adventurers to the city. He and his team begin forming the relationships that will define much of the series. While the competition creates public challenges, deeper threats emerge as city leaders uncover betrayal and a dangerous enemy begins moving in the background. Jason’s earlier choices unexpectedly connect him to this wider conflict, forcing him to face consequences beyond simple survival.
3	He Who Fights with Monsters 3	2021
Jason and his companions continue building their strength while personal enemies and larger forces close in around them. The book tests Jason’s growing influence, wealth, and confidence, showing that power in Pallimustus carries a heavy price. His team faces escalating danger as old threats return with stronger plans and new enemies exploit weaknesses. The conflict pushes Jason toward harsher choices and reinforces one of the series’ recurring themes: winning can cost more than survival.
4	He Who Fights with Monsters 4	2021
After an unexpected return to Earth, Jason must decide whether he still belongs in the world he left behind. His powers, scars, and changed outlook make him feel increasingly alien among family, friends, and old institutions. As he uncovers hidden magical secrets on Earth, he discovers that his home world is more complicated and vulnerable than he ever knew. The book shifts the series into a new phase, blending homecoming drama with wider supernatural stakes.
5	He Who Fights with Monsters 5	2022
Jason continues navigating Earth’s hidden magical world while trying to protect the people close to him. As old assumptions about his home world collapse, he is pulled into conflicts involving secret factions, magical resources, and threats that ordinary society cannot see. The story deepens Jason’s relationship with his family and Earth allies while showing how difficult it is for him to separate personal loyalty from cosmic responsibility. His choices increasingly affect both worlds.
6	He Who Fights with Monsters 6	2022
With Earth moving toward disaster, Jason must act despite warnings from those who underestimate or oppose him. Powerful groups ignore the scale of the danger, leaving him to pursue impossible solutions with limited strength and growing desperation. His decisions draw him toward forces no mortal should touch and open the series toward a broader cosmic landscape. The book focuses on sacrifice, identity, and the meaning of home as Jason carries the fate of two worlds.
7	He Who Fights with Monsters 7	2022
Jason returns to Pallimustus and arrives in a kingdom under siege, only to find that saving it is not his assigned role. While he tries to rest and recover, political figures, old foes, unexpected allies, and local institutions pull him back into trouble. Separated friends work to reach him, while Jason struggles with anger and trauma from his time away. The book explores how much he has changed and how others react when they underestimate him.
8	He Who Fights with Monsters 8	2022
After a long-awaited reunion, Jason tries to move beyond past trauma and return to adventuring with his friends. New dangers emerge as enemies who had been operating in the background begin acting openly. Jason and his team respond with plans of their own, sending companions into risky missions and drawing them into personal and unexpected confrontations. The story advances Jason’s connection to cosmic power while showing that each step forward comes with emotional and practical costs.
9	He Who Fights with Monsters 9	2023
With the Builder threat behind him, Jason enters a period of transition in which rebuilding, training, and future threats shape the story. He and his companions adjust to changed circumstances while unresolved enemies, political pressures, and the wider consequences of past conflicts remain active. The book balances recovery with preparation, using quieter character moments to set up larger struggles. Jason’s role in the world continues expanding as personal bonds and cosmic obligations become harder to separate.
10	He Who Fights with Monsters 10	2023
A subterranean power forces uneasy alliances and draws Jason into a new web of hidden agendas. The conflict brings together groups that would normally oppose each other, making trust and strategy as important as strength. Jason’s team must operate amid secrecy, political manoeuvring, and threats rising from beneath the surface. The book continues expanding the scale of the series while keeping attention on how Jason’s reputation, powers, and relationships complicate every new crisis.
11	He Who Fights with Monsters 11	2024
The eleventh book continues the later Pallimustus arc as Jason and his allies face the consequences of earlier victories and the demands of greater power. The story focuses on alliances, preparation, and increasingly complex threats that test both individual strength and team cohesion. As Jason’s influence grows, so does the attention from enemies and higher powers. The volume serves as a bridge between recent conflicts and the next major stage of the series.
12	He Who Fights with Monsters 12	2025
Set years after Jason was first pulled into a world of magic and monsters, the twelfth book reflects on how much his life and role have changed. The narrative continues the series’ long-running exploration of power, responsibility, friendship, and trauma as Jason confronts new consequences from earlier choices. His relationships and reputation shape the dangers around him, while the wider magical and cosmic stakes continue to grow. The book positions the series for future escalation.
13	He Who Fights with Monsters 13	2026
Jason Asano returns to Earth with Team Biscuit, to find earth changing faster than ever. As complex magical threats emerge, his hard-won power and reputation make him both a valuable ally and a target. The second Earth arc begins, testing Jason's loyalty, leadership, and place between two worlds.

== Reception and popularity ==
The series was described by Publishers Weekly as "much-beloved in the litRPG community."

== Merchandise ==
Podium Audio has released a small line of both artwork and apparel merchandise.

In July 2026 Catalyst Game Labs announced they have partnered with Travis Deverell, to develop a He Who Fights with Monsters tabletop adaptations, including a role-playing game using a modified Dice Core system and a competitive board game set in Pallimustus.

== See also ==
- Dungeon Crawler Carl
