= Cozy fantasy =

Subgenre of fantasy fiction

Cozy fantasy is a subgenre of fantasy fiction characterized by its focus on comforting, low-stakes narratives set in fantasy worlds. It emphasizes themes of community, friendship, healing, and everyday life, often eschewing violence, war, and other serious conflicts which are typical of high fantasy.

== Characteristics ==
Cozy fantasy emphasizes hope, kindness, empathy, and community. Relationships, including family, found family, friendship, and healthy romance, are central, and many cozy fantasies have queer protagonists. Works in the genre often feature comforting food and drink such as tea and baked goods, and focus on everyday slice-of-life scenes. They often take place in a single location, such as a small town, inn, or shop. Cozy fantasies typically avoid large-scale conflict, although there is debate over how much conflict disqualifies a story from the category.

Cozy fantasy is a subgenre of the broader cozy fiction genre, which includes related (and sometimes overlapping) genres like cozy mystery.

== History ==
The label cozy fantasy gained prominence in early 2020, though works with similar qualities predate the term. J. R. R. Tolkien's The Hobbit (1937) and Diana Wynne Jones' Howl's Moving Castle (1986) are sometimes described as cozy fantasies, though they were published before the term became popular. Some attribute the genre's rise in popularity to readers and writers seeking escapism during the COVID-19 pandemic. The online community BookTok helped establish and popularize the category.

== Examples ==
- A Psalm for the Wild-Built by Becky Chambers (2021)
- The House in the Cerulean Sea by TJ Klune (2020)
- Legends & Lattes by Travis Baldree (2022)
- The Spellshop by Sarah Beth Durst (2024)
- The Very Secret Society of Irregular Witches by Sangu Mandanna (2022)

== See also ==
- Cozy game
- Hopepunk
