= Bookshops & Bonedust =

Fantasy novel by Travis Baldree

- First edition cover
- Author: Travis Baldree
- Cover artist: Carson Lowmiller
- Language: English
- Series: Legends & Lattes
- Genre: Fantasy
- Publisher: Tor Books
- Publication date: November 7th, 2023
- Publication place: United States
- Media type: Print (paperback), ebook, audiobook
- Pages: 352
- ISBN: 978-1-250-88610-1
- Preceded by: Legends & Lattes
- Followed by: Brigands & Breadknives

Bookshops & Bonedust is a fantasy novel written by American author Travis Baldree. It was first published in trade paperback and ebook by Tor Books and in audiobook by Macmillan Audio in November, 2023. It is a prequel to the author's 2022 novel Legends & Lattes.

== Plot ==
Viv is an orc mercenary who is contracted to fight the necromancer Varine the Pale. Her leg is injured in her very first fight, and her boss leaves her in the town of Murk to recover.

In Murk, Viv befriends a bookseller ratkin named Fern. She also meets the gnome Gallina and begins a summer romance with a dwarf baker named Maylee. Throughout the next few weeks, Viv grows close with her new companions. Gallina attempts to convince Viv to advocate for her admission to her mercenary company. They renovate Fern’s struggling bookshop, invite a local author for a book signing, and begin a book club.

One day while working in Fern’s shop, Viv fights with a man named Balthus. Viv, Gallina, and Balthus spend the night in jail, but he escapes. His corpse is later found, revealing him to be a necromancer. Viv, Gallina, and Fern find that Balthus’s satchel contains an enslaved skeleton named Satchel. Balthus had stolen Satchel from Varine and fled; he had also planted a stolen tome in Fern’s bookstore. The book is used as a magical storage container. Viv draws a greatsword, Blackblood, from it, which alerts Varine.

Varine arrives in Murk along with her undead army in an attempt to recover the book from Fern's bookstore. The necromancer take Fern and Gallina captive before Viv and her friends kill Varine and free Satchel. Viv’s mercenary company returns to town and she leaves her new friends behind.

In an epilogue twenty years later, now the proprietor of her own cafe, Viv receives a letter from Fern and they plan to meet up again.

== Reception ==
Marlene Harris in a starred "Pick of the Month" review in Library Journal, calls the novel "a fantasy story with many of the same pleasures that cozy mysteries offer their readers," and "the perfect place for readers to start Baldree's cozy fantasy series where folks band together for good, and evil is conquered through cleverness and friendship." She characterizes it as "a lovely coming-of-age story about a character trained for war who learns that there's more to life than endless battles," noting that "[w]hat makes the story special is the way that so many stock fantasy archetypes are cast against type and find new modes of prospering that don't involve big weapons and bigger wars."

Kira Muratova, reviewing the audiobook version in Booklist, notes that the "prequel ... answers several of its predecessor's burning questions, including how everyone's favorite coffee-loving orc learned to appreciate books. ... Read by the author, a talented and animated fantasy narrator who also voiced Legends, the book presents a colorful cast of new and familiar characters that is sure to ensorcell and delight listeners.

Sarah Rice, also in Booklist, claims the book "cements [Baldree's] talent for cozy fantasy, engaging characters, and anachronistic references that would be at home in a Discworld novel. ... Knowing where a character ends up often drains tension from a prequel, but Baldree avoids that pitfall because the joy of reading here isn't a simple uncertainty over who lives or dies but rather watching friendships blossom and characters grow. Folks who enjoyed the camaraderie and settings of this year's Dungeons & Dragons movie—as well as anyone who likes the idea of an orc warrior becoming a devotee of the power of reading and its ability to broaden your horizons—should check out Viv's adventures."

Publishers Weekly writes that "Bestseller Baldree’s cozy standalone sequel to Legends & Lattes shows that even a battle-hungry orc can find happiness in life’s simple pleasures. ... The innocent joy of Viv and Fern’s love is delightful and Baldree’s formula of placing low-stakes stories in high-fantasy settings remains good fun. Series fans will eat this up."

Kirkus Reviews characterizes the book as a "prequel to the popular cozy fantasy Legends & Lattes" that "can stand alone, but will certainly satisfy fans as well." It calls the setting "charming," with "compelling, richly drawn characters," and "vibes ... decidedly warm and cozy" despite the "hint of danger in the wind," summing up the story as "[w]arm and wonderful."
