= Sabino High School =

Location
- 5000 N. Bowes Road; Tanque Verde, Arizona; United States; 32°17′57″N 110°47′18″W

Information
- Type: Public
- Established: September 5, 1972 (54 years ago)
- School district: Tucson Unified School District
- CEEB code: 030503
- Teaching staff: 40.50 (FTE)
- Grades: 9–12
- Enrollment: 816 (2024–2025)
- Student to teacher ratio: 20.15
- Colors: Purple and gold
- Mascot: Sabercat
- Accreditation: Blue Ribbon 2013
- Website: sabinohs.tusd1.org

Sabino High School is a public secondary education school located in Tucson, Arizona. Located on the northeast side of the city, it is a part of the Tucson Unified School District. The principal is Kevin Amidan.

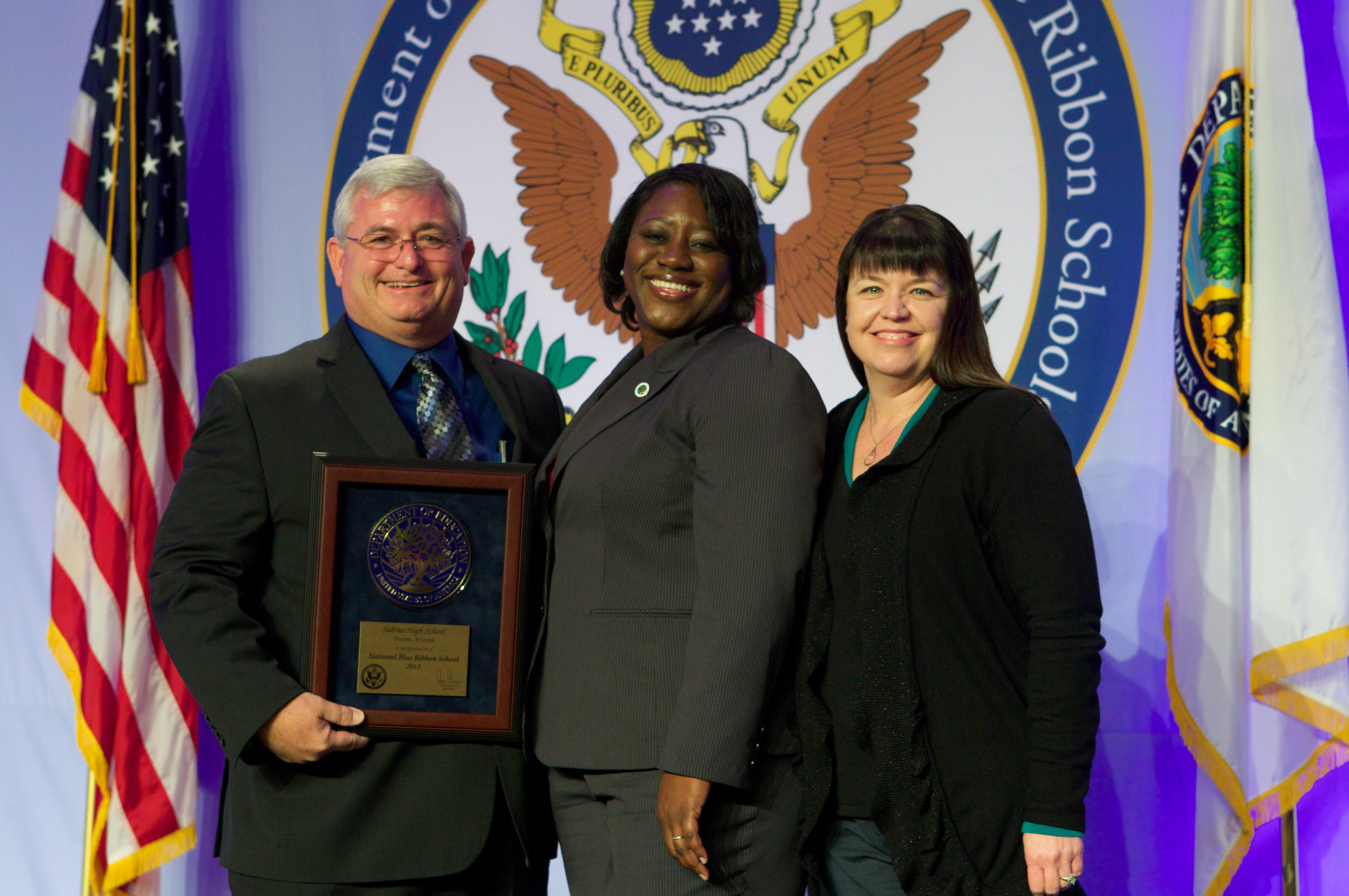
2013 National Blue Ribbon Schools Winners

== History ==
The school was established in 1972 in response to the boom of Tucson, Arizona's east side in the 1960s and 1970s. It is named after nearby Sabino Canyon. Contemporary establishments Santa Rita High School and Sahuaro High School have similar facilities. Starting with grades 9 and 10, it finally had a full graduating class in 1975. This class chose the school colors purple and gold, and chose Sabercats as the mascot. A committee of freshman at Sahuaro who were going to transfer as sophomores into Sabino came up with the choices put up to a vote of all of the incoming sophomores. The other option was maroon and silver, with the mascot of the Toros. In the early years of the school, a junior high (grades 7 and 8) was located on the same campus. The colors of the junior high were orange and brown and their team was the Sidewinders.

== Sports ==
Sabino has a rich sports tradition, mainly in the sport of football. Apart from football Sabino has also won team state championships in volleyball (1989) softball(1991) cheerleading (2004, 2010) golf (1986), baseball (1997), men's (1995, 2005) and women's soccer (1996, 2008), swimming and diving, cross country (2007), and track and field, and individual state titles in wrestling and tennis.

=== Early years ===
Sabino struggled through its first two decades. Coached by Don Holley in their first varsity seasons, the Sabercats struggled for wins, culminating with an 0–20 record in Coach Holley's last two seasons. Those struggles were soon forgotten with the arrival of Arizona high school coaching legend Ollie Mayfield, who had led perennial state championship contenders at Tucson High School. Mayfield instilled a sense of pride and commitment that spurred Sabino to its first playoff game in 1977 against cross town powerhouse Amphi. Mayfield was still quite popular at Tucson High, so end zone bleachers at Rincon High School were added to accommodate the overflow crowd. Sabino lost, but it was the beginning of a superpower football program in Arizona. In 1978, Mayfield led Sabino back to the playoffs where the Sabercats stunned No. 1 ranked Sunnyside 24–7. Sabino advanced to the state playoffs for the first time, but lost to Phoenix Washington 7–3. Mayfield continued with his successes in 1979, again moving the team into the playoffs with a first round win against Tucson's Salpointe Catholic High School, eventually losing in the quarterfinals to the Mesa Jackrabbits in a hard-fought game at Westwood High School in Mesa. Those teams generated several All-Star, All-City and All-State selections, thus creating the foundation for those who would follow. Mayfield had set Sabino well on the path of its winning ways with 3-year totals of 23 wins and 12 losses, the latter being primarily attributed to his first season.

=== 1990s ===
In 1999, the Arizona Interscholastic Association reclassified the school as 5A due to enrollment growth. That year they became the first team in state history to move up a class and make the state title game in the same year.

=== Rebuilding ===
With a new head coach and a realignment back to the 4A Conference, in 2005 they made it back to the state title game for the first time in 6 years but lost to Glendale's Cactus High School. In 2006, while compiling a 12–2 record, the Sabercats again reached the state championship game but fell to Scottsdale's Saguaro High School at then-new University of Phoenix Stadium. In 2009, Sabino made it to the State Championship game again but fell short to Canyon del Oro High School.

=== State football records ===
Sabino High School holds the division 4A record for most shutouts in a season, with 8 in 1990. They finished that season 14-0 and won the state championship. It also holds the record for most interceptions in a season by any team in the state (at any level) with 40 in 1989 and again in 1992. In 1992 they again went 14–0 and won the state championship.

| Record | Number | Player/Game |
| Touchdowns (Game) | 8 | Santos Olague vs. Tucson Desert View, 1998 |
| Touchdowns (Half) | 7 | Santos Olague vs. Tucson Desert View, 1998 |
| Touchdowns (Season) | 51 **STATE RECORD** | Shane Coopwood, 2006 |
| Points (Game) | 48 | Santos Olague vs. Tucson Desert View, 1998 |
| Points (Season) | 306 **STATE RECORD** | Nathan Wize, 1997 |
| Points (Career) | 360 | Nathan Wize, 1996–97 |
| Longest Touchdown Run (Scrimmage) | 99 Yds | Zach Joseph vs. Douglas High School, 2013 |
| Rushing Yards (Season) | 3,121, Shane Coopwood, 2006 | ranked 4th in the nation in '06 |

== Notable alumni ==
- Carrie Gerlach Cecil, American author and businessperson
- J. J. Hardy, Major League Baseball shortstop
- Dan Hicks, sportscaster
- Jacques Servin, activist artist and author, co-founder of the Yes Men
- Jonathan Paton, candidate for the U.S. House of Representatives
- Brooks Reed, NFL linebacker
- Robert Sarver, former owner of the Phoenix Suns
- Matt Dinniman, #1 New York Times bestselling author of the Dungeon Crawler Carl book series.
