= The Wandering Inn =

Fantasy web series

- Author: Pirateaba
- Language: English
- Genre: Fantasy LitRPG web serial
- Publisher: HarperCollins (first 4 volumes), Podium Audio (audiobook), Cloudscape Comics (comic book)
- Publication date: 2016–present (web); August 11, 2026 (print)
- Pages: 15,000,000+ words
- Website: wanderinginn.com

The Wandering Inn is a LitRPG fantasy web series started in 2016, written by the pseudonymous "Pirateaba". The series is known in part for its length. At over 15 million words and growing, it has been called one of the longest published works in history.

== Plot ==
The story first follows Erin Solstice, a girl from Earth who finds herself transported to a fantasy world ruled by a role-playing-game-like system with classes and levels. Fleeing monsters, Erin finds an abandoned inn and takes on the class of an Innkeeper. Instead of pursuing heroic quests, Erin dedicates herself to running a safe haven for adventurers and outcasts, placing a sign outside her inn that reads, "No Killing Goblins". Her modest business slowly transforms into a global focal point for both local fantasy races—like the Antinium and Drakes—and other transported Earthlings. As the story expands across multiple continents, the series explores diplomacy, magical warfare, the clash of Earth's technology with the people of "Innworld", and struggles to stop world-ending threats.

== Publication ==
The Wandering Inn is published on multiple mediums. The series originally began as a web serial, often with biweekly chapter updates, with chapters averaging around 20,000 words. Initially, all chapters were available for free, with Patreon supporters able to read the latest released chapter early. In 2017, Pirateaba announced that Patreon donations were high enough for them to write full time. In 2019, Pirateaba had the 7th most patreons on the website's writing category. The serial was published on Royal Road, a serial hosting company, as well as on the author's WordPress blog. The book is available also in ebook format, along with a comic book published by Cloudscape Comics. In 2026, HarperCollins announced that it had acquired the rights to the first four volumes of the series. As a result, the author has limited the previously free access to the first two volumes.

The books are also available in audiobook form, published by Podium Audio, with the first 15 books narrated by Andrea Parsneau. As of Book 19, the audiobook length is 771 hours and 13 minutes. Pirateaba said in an interview they (Note: Pirateaba has stated multiple times that they accept any pronouns due to their anonymity, however they/them is typically used.) agreed to work with Podium since it had been the first publisher of The Martian. After the announcement of a television adaptation for Dungeon Crawler Carl, Pirateaba said they would prefer an animated adaption of their series. "There are a few western animation styles I like; a lot of anime styles would also work well for the story," but "CGI or live action would surely fail given the complexities of characters like Antinium or even Drakes."

With a length of over 17 million words as of 2026, the Wandering Inn is one of the longest book series ever written.

The series is cited as an example of using "direct audience feedback and reader-driven plot developments". The author has acknowledged that they take into account reader comments and try to incorporate any noted problems, viewing it as an opportunity for "crowdsource editing".

=== Entries ===
Original volume	E-book number	E-book title	E-book release date	Audiobook release date	Print edition number	Print edition title	Print release date	Pages	ISBN
1	1	The Wandering Inn	August 2, 2018	September 10, 2019	1	The Wandering Inn	August 11, 2026	640	9780063516380
1	1	The Wandering Inn	August 2, 2018	September 10, 2019	2	No Killing Goblins	September 22, 2026	784	9780063516403
2	2	Fae and Fare	September 14, 2019	July 14, 2020	3	Fae and Fare	October 20, 2026	848	9780063516427
2	2	Fae and Fare	September 14, 2019	July 14, 2020	4	Immortal Games	November 10, 2026	816	9780063516465
3	3	Flowers of Esthelm	November 5, 2020	April 27, 2021					
3	4	Winter Solstice	July 27, 2021	July 27, 2021					
4	5	The Last Light	November 23, 2021	November 23, 2021					
4	6	The General of Izril	May 26, 2022	April 26, 2022					
5	7	Rains of Liscor	July 26, 2022	July 26, 2022					
5	8	Blood of Liscor	November 22, 2022	November 22, 2022					
5	9	Tears of Liscor	April 25, 2023	April 25, 2023					
6	10	The Wind Runner	September 18, 2023	September 19, 2023					
6	11	The Titan of Baleros	November 14, 2023	November 14, 2023					
6	12	The Witch of Webs	June 11, 2024	June 11, 2024					
6	13	The Empress of Beasts	September 10, 2024	September 10, 2024					
6	14	Hell's Wardens	November 12, 2024	November 12, 2024					
7	15	Garden of Sanctuary	April 1, 2025	April 1, 2025					
7	16	King of Duels	July 29, 2025	July 29, 2025					
7	17	Lady of Fire	November 25, 2025	November 25, 2025					
7	18	Archmage's Ire	March 31, 2026	March 31, 2026					
7	19	Couriers Outbound	May 26, 2026	May 26, 2026					
7	20	Memory's Flame	Not yet released	November 3, 2026					
8	Not yet commercially published								
9	Not yet commercially published								
10	Not yet commercially published; still being serialized								

== Reviews and awards ==
The Wandering Inn is regularly included on lists of top entries in the LitRPG genre. Jacob Kienlen of IGN included the series on his top-10 LitRPG Books list and praised the way the series "unravels the universe through various points of view". Preston Simmons from Reader's Grotto ranked the web serial at #2 in his list of "The Top 10 Best LitRPG Books in 2022", calling it "one of the best LitRPG books of all time". Additionally, he says, "This web serial is many things at once, all done exceptionally well." Similarly, NAG Magazine in South Africa included the series on its list of top 3 LitRPG Books, praising it for being "massive, emotional, funny, and surprisingly heartfelt at times". Eun Yoon from Fugue magazine included the series in her list of best web serials, calling it a "captivating entry to the genre" and a "richly rewarding experience".

Adam Weller at Fantasy Book Review, while noting the web serial is "essentially a first draft", compared it favorably to the Worm series, "where all of your other interests are put aside so you can tear into this story as quickly as possible". The series has also been noted for eschewing the power fantasy tropes common in the LitRPG genre. Nils Ödlund at Read Indie Fantasy praised the series, including the characters and the "over-the-top amazing magic", but also noted that "the overarching plot moves incredibly slow[ly]".

The audiobook for the series has also received praise.

== Spinoff series ==
A three-novel spinoff series, The Singer of Terandria, was released in 2025.

Number	Title	Kindle release date	Audiobook release date
1	Gravesong	April 1, 2025	April 30, 2024
2	Huntsong	October 1, 2025	December 10, 2024
3	Ghostsong	October 1, 2025	May 13, 2025
4	Warsong	Forthcoming	

== Sources ==
- Pâquet, Lili (2022). "Publishing Processes For a Digital Age". In Meekings, Sam; Moore, Marshall (eds.). Creative Writing Scholars on the Publishing Trade. Routledge. ISBN 9780367485412.
