= LitRPG =

Genre of speculative fiction using role-playing game mechanics

LitRPG (short for literary role-playing game; also written Lit RPG or litRPG) is a literary genre of speculative fiction in which the rules and mechanics of role-playing games (RPGs) are integral to the narrative. Such mechanics can include character attributes, classes, experience points, levels, quests, skills and inventories. Characters commonly recognize and interact with the rules of their worlds, using them to develop abilities or overcome challenges. LitRPG is most often associated with fantasy and science fantasy, but also appears in science fiction settings.

Although computer RPGs and massively multiplayer online role-playing games (MMORPGs) popularized many of the genre's conventions, including visible status screens and level-up notifications, other elements originated in tabletop role-playing games such as Dungeons & Dragons (1974). A LitRPG story does not therefore have to take place inside a video game or virtual reality simulation. Some works instead imagine the mechanics of an RPG as ordinary laws of their fictional worlds.

== Characteristics ==
The defining feature of LitRPG is the importance of game rules to the events of the story, rather than simply the presence of a fictional game or a game-inspired setting. Characters may acquire skills by earning experience points, choose among abilities when they increase in level, or manipulate a system of numerical attributes. Stories consequently often emphasize character development, optimization, resource management and discovering unexpected interactions between rules. While works containing extensive numerical information, character sheets and statistical updates are sometimes described as "crunchy" LitRPG; such detailed displays are not considered essential by every definition of the genre.

LitRPG is generally read as conventional prose fiction rather than played as a game. It therefore differs from interactive gamebooks, such as the Fighting Fantasy and Lone Wolf series, in which readers make decisions and apply game rules themselves. It is also distinct from fiction licensed from existing games: a novel set in a game world, such as Dungeons & Dragons or Halo universe, does not necessarily represent LitRPG unless the story itself makes RPG mechanics significant.

== History ==
=== Precursors in Western fiction ===
Elements associated with LitRPG appeared in fiction before the term was introduced. Andre Norton's Quag Keep (1978) depicts players becoming their characters in a world derived from Dungeons & Dragons. Larry Niven and Steven Barnes's Dream Park (1981), which began a four-volume series, imagines technologically enhanced live action role-playing games staged in an entertainment complex. Joel Rosenberg's The Sleeping Dragon (1983), the first novel in the Guardians of the Flame series, follows a group of role-players transported into the identities of their fantasy characters. These works anticipate later LitRPG premises, although they generally place less emphasis on numerical character progression.

Other antecedents involve immersive game-like environments without the sustained use of RPG statistics. Tad Williams's Otherland series (1996–2001) explores virtual worlds, while Conor Kostick's Epic (2004), the opening novel of the Avatar Chronicles trilogy, depicts a society whose economic and political structures depend upon participation in an MMORPG. Ernest Cline's Ready Player One (2011) incorporates virtual-world equipment and RPG elements but emphasizes puzzles and popular-culture references more than numerical advancement.

=== East Asian developments ===
Role-playing game conventions also influenced East Asian light novels, manga and other popular fiction. Japanese precursors include Record of Lodoss War (novels from 1988), derived from accounts of tabletop RPG sessions; Dragon Quest: The Adventure of Dai (manga, 1989–1996), which uses a setting and some statistical conventions from the Dragon Quest games; and Magical Circle Guru Guru (manga, 1992–2003), a parody of Japanese computer RPG conventions. These works are generally discussed as antecedents rather than examples of the subsequently named LitRPG genre.

The Japanese .hack franchise (from 2002) and Reki Kawahara's Sword Art Online (begun as a web novel in 2002 and published in print from 2009) developed stories about participation in immersive MMORPGs. Taiwanese writer Yu Wo's 1/2 Prince (2004–2005) follows a woman playing a male avatar in a virtual game. In South Korea, Nam Heesung's The Legendary Moonlight Sculptor (web serialization 2007–2019; 58 collected volumes published through 2020) placed particular emphasis on crafting skills, character advancement and the financial value of game achievements. The Korean series became known to Russian readers through unofficial online translations and influenced early Russian LitRPG authors.

=== Naming and development in Russia ===
The name LitRPG was introduced in Russia in 2013, when the publisher Eksmo launched a series of books using the designation. Accounts of the naming process identify editor Dmitry Malkin, literary agent Alex Bobl and author Vasily Mahanenko as participants. Russian writers had already been publishing works with similar features online, including Dem Mikhailov's The Sleepless Ones, Dmitry Rus's Play to Live and Mahanenko's The Way of the Shaman. The first instalment of Mikhailov's series circulated in 2012 and was published in print that year; its story concerns a man earning money through a virtual fantasy world.

Mahanenko's The Way of the Shaman (begun in 2012) follows a prisoner required to serve his sentence inside the virtual world of Barliona. Rus's Play to Live concerns people whose minds become permanently immersed in games. By early 2014, Eksmo and the Russian publisher Alfa-Kniga were issuing dedicated lines of game-related fantasy, while the genre's name was beginning to circulate beyond Russia.

=== English-language publishing and international expansion ===
LitRPG expanded into the English-language market during the mid-2010s through translations, self-published novels and online fiction. Among the prominent early English-language examples were Aleron Kong's The Land series (from 2015), Cosimo Yap's The Gam3 (2016–2019) and Travis Bagwell's Awaken Online (from 2016). The latter two use science-fictional settings.

The genre's publication model was closely associated with web fiction and digital self-publishing. Pre-existing Asian and Russian platforms included South Korea's Joara and Munpia, China's Qidian, Japan's Shōsetsuka ni Narō and the Samizdat section of Maxim Moshkov's Library. In English, Royal Road developed from a site associated with fan translations of The Legendary Moonlight Sculptor into a platform for original serialized fiction. Authors also used Kindle Direct Publishing, Kindle Unlimited and audiobook distribution; some released serial instalments to readers before issuing collected editions.

The series Dungeon Crawler Carl (begun in 2020) by Matt Dinniman became a prominent example of LitRPG's expansion beyond self-publishing in the English market. Originally independently published, it was subsequently acquired for print publication by Ace Books, and its success attracted increased attention to the LitRPG genre from mainstream publishers. Other English language series followed, such as Deverell's He Who Fights with Monsters, released under the pen name Shirtaloon and published by Aethon Books.

== Common settings and narrative forms ==
=== Virtual game-worlds ===
Many LitRPG stories take place within immersive virtual games, often in a near future in which advanced interfaces allow players to experience the world through their avatars. The related VRMMORPG tradition includes stories in which players cannot log out, virtual characters develop independent identities or the difference between simulated and physical existence becomes uncertain. Sword Art Online and Log Horizon are prominent Japanese examples. The categories overlap, but a story about an MMORPG is not necessarily LitRPG if the narrative does not place much emphasis on RPG mechanics.

Some stories combine game-like systems with isekai, a Japanese form of fiction in which characters are transported or reincarnated into another world. Overlord, In the Land of Leadale and The New Gate involve protagonists who find themselves in worlds resembling previously played games. Other series, including Death March to the Parallel World Rhapsody, feature apparently independent fantasy worlds governed by RPG-like mechanics. In such narratives, the destination world need not be an actual computer simulation.

=== RPG systems as features of reality ===
Other LitRPG narratives depict levels, classes and abilities as established features of a fictional society rather than features of software. In Pirateaba's The Wandering Inn (begun in 2016), the protagonist develops abilities associated with running an inn, while professions and classes have broader social significance. RinoZ's Book of the Dead portrays the legal consequences of receiving a forbidden necromancer class. C Mantis's The Path of Ascension applies a system of powers and advancement to an interstellar science-fantasy setting.

A related form brings game mechanics into a recognizably contemporary Earth. The Korean series Solo Leveling (web serialization begun in 2016) depicts supernatural gateways and monsters, with its protagonist acquiring a distinctive ability to advance through a game-like system. A more comprehensive version is often called system-apocalypse fiction, after Tao Wong's The System Apocalypse series (2017–2022). Wong registered the series title as a trademark in 2020, prompting controversy over its use as a general label for the subgenre. In these stories, an alien, supernatural or otherwise unexplained intervention imposes RPG rules on human civilization. Mahanenko's World of the Changed trilogy (2019) depicts Earth transformed into a lethal game environment, while Dungeon Crawler Carl turns humanity's survival after an alien invasion into an extraterrestrial entertainment spectacle.

== Related genres and forms ==
=== Progression fantasy and cultivation fiction ===
LitRPG overlaps with progression fantasy, which emphasizes the sustained growth of characters' powers or abilities. The term progression fantasy was popularized in 2019 following discussions involving writers Andrew Rowe and Will Wight. Progression fiction does not require game-like interfaces, statistics or classes. Examples include Wight's Cradle series (2016–2023), based in part on Chinese cultivation fiction, and Domagoj Kurmaic's Mother of Learning, in which a time loop permits the accumulation of magical knowledge. Conversely, a LitRPG narrative may focus on social institutions or an already powerful character rather than continuous increases in strength.

Both LitRPG and progression fantasy have points of contact with Chinese wuxia, xianxia and cultivation fiction, in which protagonists advance through training, spiritual refinement and stages of power rather than necessarily accumulating experience points. Some series combine cultivation with explicit RPG mechanics, including J. F. Brink's Defiance of the Fall, which depicts a game-like system imposed on Earth amid an interstellar setting.

=== GameLit and other game-based fiction ===
GameLit is a broader designation for fiction in which games or their rules are important to the plot, without necessarily using RPG-specific character advancement. It emerged in English-language genre discussions around 2017. In this usage, LitRPG is one kind of GameLit, although publishers and readers do not always apply the terms consistently.

Works which illustrate game-centred fiction without typical LitRPG progression include William Sleator's Interstellar Pig (1984), in which a board game reflects an extraterrestrial conflict; Iain M. Banks's The Player of Games (1988), in which an elaborate game structures an alien empire's political hierarchy; and Terry Pratchett's Only You Can Save Mankind (1992), in which characters in a computer game begin behaving independently. Later examples include Cory Doctorow's For the Win (2010), about labour and markets in online games; the Chinese series The King's Avatar (2011–2014), about professional MMORPG competition; and Japanese light novel No Game No Life (from 2012), which depicts a world where political conflicts are resolved through games.

Another variation draws on otome games and their branching romantic plots. In My Next Life as a Villainess: All Routes Lead to Doom!, a reincarnated protagonist seeks to avoid the unhappy endings assigned to a game's antagonist; I'm in Love with the Villainess likewise reworks expected romantic routes, while Trapped in a Dating Sim: The World of Otome Games Is Tough for Mobs combines a romance-game setting with mecha science fiction. These works place greater emphasis on scripted events and relationships than on the numerical development of RPG characters.

== Publishing and reception ==
Commentators have connected LitRPG's popularity with the experience of playing games and watching online gameplay. In Publishers Weekly, writer Conor Kostick compared the attraction of reading LitRPG to watching someone play a game on Twitch or YouTube, particularly because the reader can follow the effects of game mechanics. Reports on the genre's commercial growth have also highlighted its online fan communities, serial publication, audiobooks and the involvement of readers in discussions with authors.

The genre's emphasis on levelling and collecting resources can produce lengthy sequences of repetitive activity, sometimes described using the gaming terms grinding or farming. Its game systems can also support narratives concerning economic inequalities, institutional power and competition. The Encyclopedia of Science Fiction notes at the same time that "more ambitious works use the same conventions to explore social inequality, economic exploitation and the consequences of living within systems whose rules are transparent but not necessarily fair".

== See also ==
- Game studies
- Longplay
