= The Very Secret Society of Irregular Witches =

2022 romantic fantasy novel

- Author: Sangu Mandanna
- Language: English
- Genre: cozy fantasy romantic fantasy
- Publisher: Hodder (UK); Berkley (US)
- Publication date: 23 August 2022
- Publication place: United Kingdom
- Media type: Print
- Pages: 352 (US paperback)
- ISBN: 9780593439357

The Very Secret Society of Irregular Witches is a 2022 cozy fantasy and romance novel, and the adult debut from author Sangu Mandanna.

== Plot ==
Mika Moon is a witch, living in a world where magic practitioners operate in secrecy and isolation; their family are cursed to a premature death. Born and orphaned in India, Mika was brought to the UK by a friend of her grandmother, Primrose, who acted as her guardian but was rarely present. Mika is deeply lonely, living a nearly-transient life with her Golden Retriever, Circe. Wanting to share her love of magic, she uploads videos where she roleplays as the proprietress of a magic tea shop.

One of these videos is seen by Ian, a guardian of three young witches being raised by a group of non-magical adults living together in the home they call Nowhere House. The owner of the house, Lilian, is a witch who had found the orphaned girls in her travels. Now the family is facing a visit from the ever-absent Lilian's lawyer, Edward, in just six weeks. The girls cannot control their magic and risk exposing themselves during the visit. Ian is the son of a witch and recognizes Mika's magic; he invites her to become the children's tutor. Mika is reluctant, but ultimately is drawn by the warmth of Nowhere House and its inhabitants, which provides a stark contrast to her own lonely upbringing.

Mika quickly bonds with most of the household, except for Jamie, Lilian's standoffish librarian and the children's' primary caregiver, who resents the disorder Mika brings to their home, and the second oldest child, Terracotta, who takes her cues from Jamie. Nonetheless, Jamie and Mika gradually begin to trust one another. One day, a magical explosion is set off when Terracotta refuses to listen to Mika, sending the older witch into a coma. Jamie realizes he cares for Mika and Terracotta accepts that she needs Mika's instruction. When Mika wakes, it's to a sense - for the first time in her life - of being truly cared for.

As the day of the visit approaches, Mika learns that the adults have lied to her: Lilian is dead and buried in the backyard; they risk losing custody of the children. Mika is devastated.

Edward's visit is a disaster; the children animate Lilian's skeleton, revealing their true nature. Mika is forced to call on Primrose, who is the only witch she knows strong enough to wipe Edward's memory. Primrose recognizes the magic of Nowhere House's wards; Lilian was her estranged twin sister, making Primrose the girls' new legal guardian. Primrose insists the girls be separated, telling Mika the origin of the curse that leaves witches orphaned: long ago, witches banded together to cast a spell; it backfired, creating the curse.

Mika must convince Primrose that the love and community the children have at Nowhere House is more important than the risk of their concentrated magic. She is honest about the pain her childhood had caused her. Primrose acquiesces, leaving the children in the care of their family, which now includes Mika.

== Development ==
Mandanna first conceived of the novel in 2020, hoping to write a "soft, comforting book that would get me through the COVID hellscape", citing the Diana Wynne Jones novel Howl's Moving Castle and the film Practical Magic as sources of inspiration. She began the bulk of the writing in January 2021; the novel was published in August 2023.

Already an established children's author, the novel was her adult fantasy debut. Mandanna said of writing for the different age groups: "When I write for children, I'm also writing for my younger self. When I'm writing for adults, on the other hand, I'm writing for myself as I am now and that gives me room to be a little more myself."

In 2022, Mandanna had no plan for a sequel, but said returning to the world is a possibility.

== Reception ==
In a starred review, Publishers Weekly praised the cast "of winningly quirky characters", calling the novel "charming" and "a gem".

Kirkus Reviews complimented the book as "exceedingly cozy and heartfelt". Reactor called the book "as charming as it is romantic".

Olivia Waite of The New York Times named it one of the best romance novels of 2022, calling it overall "an effervescent stunner" and the conclusion in particular a "joyous shock".

== Adaptations ==
Samara MacLaren narrated the audiobook for Penguin Audio, which was released in August 2022. AudioFile complimented the audiobook, saying: "While she delivers three distinctive personalities for the three girls, MacLaren's performances are utterly believable and age appropriate. Her portrayals of the adults who watch over them--flamboyant Ian, unflappable Ken, comfortable Lucie, and prickly Jamie--are just as memorable."
