= Sangu Mandanna =

British author (born c. 1987)

- Born: 1987/1988 (age 38–39); Bengaluru, India
- Education: Lancaster University
- Years active: 2012–present
- Notable work: The Very Secret Society of Irregular Witches; A Witch's Guide to Magical Innkeeping
- Website: sangumandanna.com

Sangu Mandanna (born 1987 or 1988) is an Indian author of adult, young adult, and middle grade fiction. She is best known for her fantasy romance novels The Very Secret Society of Irregular Witches (2022) and A Witch's Guide to Magical Innkeeping (2025).

== Early life and education ==
Mandanna was born in 1987 or 1988 and raised in Bengaluru, India. At 18 she moved to England to attend Lancaster University, where she studied English literature and creative writing before graduating in 2010.

== Career ==
In 2012, Mandanna's debut novel The Lost Girl, a young adult dystopia, was published through Balzer & Bray. Mandanna's subsequent novels for young adults include The Celestial Trilogy, a sci-fi retelling of the Mahabharata, which began with the publication of A Spark Of White Fire through Sky Pony press in 2018. The subsequent novels, A House of Rage and Sorrow and A War of Swallowed Stars, were published in 2019 and 2021. In 2019, Mandanna edited Color Outside the Lines, a young-adult anthology about teenagers in interracial relationships. In 2025, Mandanna published the young adult novel Vanya and the Wild Hunt, which describes a neurodiverse pre-teen who finds comfort with creatures from Southeast Asian mythology. Publishers Weekly commended the book's "nuanced depictions of neurodivergent characters and how they move within a magical society", but described the plot as "somewhat rushed and predictable".

In 2021, Mandanna published her first novel in the Kiki Kallira middle grade fantasy series, Kiki Kallira Breaks a Kingdom. She followed it with Kiki Kallira Conquers a Curse the subsequent year. Like some of Mandanna's other work, the series incorporates Southeast Asian mythology and discusses neurodiversity; the main character, Kiki, is coping with obsessive–compulsive disorder and anxiety, and explores a world inspired by Indian mythology. In 2025, Mandanna published her first graphic novel, illustrated by Pablo Ballesteros. Jupiter Nettle and the Seven Schools of Magic is a middle grade graphic novel, and was positively reviewed by School Library Journal.

Mandanna's first novel for adults, The Very Secret Society of Irregular Witches, was published by Berkley Books in 2022. Kirkus Reviews described the book as a "magical tale about finding yourself" in a 2022 starred review. It was nominated for the 2022 Goodreads Choice Award for Reader's Favourite Fantasy, and described as a "hit" by the New York Times Book Review. The New York Times included the book on its "Best Romance Novels of 2022" list.

In 2025, Mandanna released her second novel for adults, A Witch's Guide to Magical Innkeeping. The book reached number six on the New York Times best-seller list for paperback trade fiction, and number five on Publishers Weekly's trade paperback bestsellers list. The book was nominated for the 2025 Goodreads Choice Award for Reader's Favourite Romantasy and was included by the New York Times on their list of 100 notable books of 2025. Both The Very Secret Society of Irregular Witches and A Witch's Guide to Magical Innkeeping have been described as cosy fantasy novels.

== Personal life ==
Mandanna lives with her husband and three children in Norwich, England. She has obsessive–compulsive disorder, depression, and anxiety.

== Bibliography ==
=== Adult ===
- The Very Secret Society of Irregular Witches (Berkley Books, 2022)
- A Witch's Guide to Magical Innkeeping (Berkley Books, 2025)

=== Young adult ===
- The Lost Girl (Balzer + Bray, 2012)
- Color Outside the Lines (editor; Soho Teen, 2019)
- Vanya and the Wild Hunt (Roaring Brook Press, 2025)

==== The Celestial Trilogy ====
- A Spark of White Fire (Sky Pony, 2018)
- A House of Rage and Sorrow (Sky Pony, 2019)
- A War of Swallowed Stars (Sky Pony, 2021)

=== Middle grade ===
- Kiki Kallira Breaks a Kingdom (Viking Children's, 2021)
- Kiki Kallira Conquers a Curse (Viking Children's, 2022)
- Jupiter Nettle and the Seven Schools of Magic (graphic novel illustrated by Pablo Ballesteros; Viking Children's, 2024)
