= Will Wight =

American writer (born 1989)

- Born: William Lawrence Wight III; August 11, 1989 (age 37); Memphis, Tennessee, U.S.
- Education: University of Central Florida (BA, MFA)
- Occupation: Fiction writer
- Writing career
- Period: 2013–present
- Genres: Progression fantasy, science fiction
- Notable work: Cradle; Elder Empire; The Last Horizon; Traveler's Gate
- Website: willwight.com

William Lawrence Wight III (born August 11, 1989) is an American author of fantasy literature. He independently published the Cradle series, which has topped the Amazon Kindle Store's bestseller list on multiple occasions and made the New York Times Best Seller list. He also wrote the Traveler's Gate trilogy and Elder Empire series.

== Early life ==
Will Wight was born in Memphis, Tennessee, and received his B.A in 2011 and M.F.A in 2013 in Creative Writing from the University of Central Florida. He is the first of three siblings.

== Career ==
Will Wight began self-publishing novels in 2013 with the Traveler's Gate series, starting with the book House of Blades, which he wrote while earning his master's degree. He has stated his coursework during his degree was integral to helping him form the structure that he uses to write his books. House of Blades was so successful that Wight was able to become a full-time independent writer shortly after it was published. He later founded Hidden Gnome Publishing as an independent business to handle publishing, merchandising, and other related activities. In 2022, he funded the publication of physical books through Kickstarter.

He won the Stabby Award for Best Self-Published/Independent Novel of 2013 on Reddit's r/Fantasy for his first book House of Blades. Wight subsequently won the same award two more times in 2018 for Ghostwater, and in 2019 for Underlord. Due to his number of wins, Wight was retired from eligibility for the awards in 2020. The audiobooks for Bloodline, Reaper, Dreadgod, and Waybound narrated by Travis Baldree, appeared on the New York Times Best Seller list for the month that they were released. The audiobook of the final volume of Cradle, Waybound was the best seller on Audible the week it was released. An animatic for Cradle, covering the first two books of the series, premiered on November 1, 2025.

Wight takes inspiration from xianxia and wuxia literature, as part of the emerging Western equivalent, the progression fantasy and cultivation genres.

Wight has attended Dragon Con, and frequently livestreams on Twitch before and after book releases.

== Bibliography ==
=== Novels ===
The novels take place in the same multiverse, within universes called Iterations which have different magic systems but which follow similar underlying principles. An organization named the Abidan maintains and manages these Iterations, though maintaining a policy of non-interference regarding day-to-day affairs.

==== Traveler's Gate series ====
On an Iteration called Amalgam, Travelers gain power from otherworldly Territories. The series centers on Simon, a boy who earns his power to save his friends and family. Soon, he finds himself caught in greater battles.

1. House of Blades, (2013, ISBN 978-0989671705)
2. The Crimson Vault, (2013, ISBN 978-0989671798)
3. City of Light, (2014, ISBN 978-0989671712)

==== Elder Empire series ====
On the Iteration of Asylum, Elders are powerful inhuman entities, restrained by the Emperor of the Aurelian Empire. After his death, the balances of power begin to shift.

These books consist of two parallel series, with a different protagonist.

===== The Elder Empire: Shadow =====
The assassin Shera pursues anti-authoritarian agenda.

1. Of Shadow and Sea (2015, ISBN 978-0989671736)
2. Of Darkness and Dawn (2015, ISBN 978-0999851173)
3. Of Killers and Kings (2020, ISBN 978-1734958102)

===== The Elder Empire: Sea =====
Calder Marten, captain of The Testament, works to restore the Empire.

1. Of Sea and Shadow (2015, ISBN 978-0999851159)
2. Of Dawn and Darkness (2016, ISBN 978-0999851180)
3. Of Kings and Killers (2020, ISBN 978-0999851197)

==== Cradle ====
On the Iteration known as Cradle, Wei Shi Lindon is born a weak Unsouled, forbidden to seek power in the sacred arts, a dictate which he breaks.

1. Unsouled (June 2016, ISBN 978-0989671767)
2. Soulsmith (September 2016, ISBN 978-0989671774)
3. Blackflame (August 2017, ISBN 978-0989671781)
4. Skysworn (September 2017, ISBN 978-0999851104)
5. Ghostwater (May 2018, ISBN 978-0999851111)
6. Underlord (March 2019, ISBN 978-0999851128)
7. Uncrowned (September 2019, ISBN 978-0999851142)
8. Wintersteel (October 2020, ISBN 978-1734958119)
9. Bloodline (April 2021, ISBN 978-1734958133)
10. Reaper (November 2021, ISBN 978-1734958164)
11. Dreadgod (July 2022, ISBN 978-1734958188)
12. Waybound (June 2023, ISBN 978-1959001102)
13. Threshold (January 2025, ISBN 978-1959001683)

==== The Last Horizon ====
In the Iteration called Fathom, Varic Vallenar captains The Last Horizon while trying to save his Iteration from various apocalypses.

1. The Captain (April 2023, ISBN 978-1959001096)
2. The Engineer (December 2023, ISBN 978-1959001324)
3. The Knight (June 2024, ISBN 978-1959001522)
4. The Pilot (July 2025, ISBN 978-1959001737)

=== Short stories ===
- "The Savior of Garden's Gate" (2019) (in the Heroes Wanted: A Fantasy Anthology, ISBN 978-1713321835)
