= Brigands & Breadknives =

Fantasy novel by Travis Baldree

- First edition cover
- Author: Travis Baldree
- Cover artist: Carson Lowmiller
- Language: English
- Series: Legends & Lattes
- Genre: Fantasy
- Publisher: Tor Books
- Publication date: November 11, 2025
- Publication place: United States
- Media type: Print (hardcover, paperback)
- Pages: 336
- ISBN: 978-1-250-33488-6
- OCLC: 1478324293
- Preceded by: Bookshops & Bonedust

Brigands & Breadknives is a fantasy novel written by American author Travis Baldree. It was first published in hardcover by Tor Books and digital audio by Macmillan Audio in November 2025, with the first British edition issued in hardcover and trade paperback by Tor UK in the same month.

The novel was a finalist for the 2025 Goodreads Choice Award for Best Fantasy,.

== Plot ==
Rattkin bookseller Fern Teverlin, formerly of the seaside town of Murk, has become dissatisfied with her life, and decides to relocate to the inland town of Thune, where her old friend Viv the Orc had established the thriving coffee shop Legends & Lattes. The plan is for Fern to open a new book shop in the building next door. On her journey, her coach comes under attack, and she and her fellow passengers are saved by the legendary Elf Oathmaiden, Astryx One-Ear, wielder of the talking Elder Blade, Nigel. Reaching Thune and reuniting with Viv, Fern soon realizes she is still depressed. A night of drink in the wake of the new shop's grand opening ends with her falling asleep in a cart, which the next morning she discovers is that of her former rescuer, Astryx. Moreover, as they are well on their way to the elf's next destination, she had no easy way to get back to Thune.

Astryx has captured the elusive goblin thief Zyll, on whom there is a bounty she intends to collect. Keeping Zyll captive is a hit or miss proposition, as the goblin tends to vanish and reappear at random intervals, seeming to remain with Astryx mostly as a matter of preference, and perhaps safety, since others are also after the bounty, and the Oathmaiden proves an able defender. Fern earns her place in the party by undertaking to translate for Zyll, who appears ignorant of the common speech of the Territory. The translation is hit-or-miss, since Fern's fluency in Goblin is limited to swear words, and ultimately unnecessary, since Zyll is later revealed to know the common speech after all. As the journey continues, however, Fern takes on the role of aide and squire to Astryx.

The party has a series of encounters with seekers after the bounty; notably Chak the Pathless, a mage who is easily defeated by Astryx, and Orc warrior Tullah, leader of a band of adventurers who actually wants to kill Zyll (and Astryx). Tullah beats Astryx and leaves her grievously wounded, but the party is saved by Zyll, who has her own Elder Blade (albeit breadknife sized), which she uses to destroy the bridge over the chasm on which the fight took place, stranding Tullah's band on the other side. She passes the blade on to Fern, who nicknames it Breadlee. The party recuperates in a monastery of Tarimite Rattkin devoted to saving the world by placating their death god, where they meet the bard Staysha, a Dwarf who becomes their companion for a time but ultimately betrays the group. The party also helps save the town of Bycross from mercenaries who have conned their way into becoming its protectors, defends a village against hybrid plant zombies, and is finally ambushed by Tullah's band again. During their journey with Astryx both Fern and Zyll prove their worth time and time again, and the three companions become close.

In the city of Amberlin the matter of the bounty is resolved in an unexpected way, and the party separates. Fern is offered the position of Astryx's squire on a permanent basis, but declines, electing instead to return to Thune and make amends with Viv, write her memoirs, and travel on her own in the company of Quillin, another Rattkin she has encountered and become enamored with during her adventures.

== Relation to other works ==
Brigands & Breadknives is a follow-up novel to the previously written stories in the series, originally published out of order; the novel Bookshops & Bonedust (2023), which introduced Fern and established her friendship with Viv, the short story "Pages to Fill" (2022), which explored Viv's inspiration to retire from adventure and open a coffee shop, the novel Legends & Lattes (2022), which introduced Viv and in which she realized her ambition, and the novella Goblins & Greatcoats (2024), which introduced Zyll.

== Reception ==
Sarah Rice in Booklist calls the novel "[a] truly entertaining romp with th assurance of warmth, welcome, and delicious treats at the end of the road," "more focused on risk and derring-do" and "[p]erhaps not as cozy as earlier entries" in the series, while retaining "the same theme of people finding trust and friendship. Anyone ever stuck in a rut will enjoy the heroes' escapes from theirs. ... for some, that will make the relationships and victories won all the sweeter"

Publishers Weekly notes that ""Fern's escapades on the road allow her to reassess her life's trajectory and discover a passion for telling stories in addition to selling them. ... While this road trip romp is more action-packed than previous installments, Baldree still conjures up the sense of cozy intimacy the series is known for. It's a delight.

Marlene Harris in Library Journal feels the book "ties the series together with a cozy bow as it catches up the story of Bookshops & Bonedust to Viv's present and takes readers on a slightly less cozy but very compelling journey with the cynical, self-deprecating, constantly cursing Fern to forge a tale of wacky schemes, found sisterhood, and growth." She concludes "[r]eaders will be delighted to encounter more of Viv and her friends, as will anyone who loves cozy fantasies such as Rebecca Thorne's 'Tomes and Tea' series."

Jennifer Dowell, assessing the audiobook version (narrated by the author) in Kirkus Reviews writes that "Baldree depicts Fern's anxiety and uncertainty with equal parts charm and compassion, and Astryx "initially as haughty and standoffish, but over time her demeanor thaws. Baldree rounds out the quintet by voicing two magical weapons, Nigel and Breadlee, as comedic opposites. Nigel is stuffy, while Breadlee is brash." Over all, "[l]isteners will love returning to the cozy fantasy world of Legends & Lattes."

Anushree Nande in Strange Horizons calls Brigands & Breadknives "a brave book ... a cozy fantasy novel that acknowledges the hard, the messy, the jagged, and the wrenching bittersweet, while simultaneously advocating for hope and belief in an essential goodness. It's a book that's all the stronger, more beautiful, and more emotionally resonant for its messiness and vulnerability, and nobody embodies this complexity better than Fern."
