= Legends & Lattes =

Fantasy novel by Travis Baldree

- First edition cover
- Author: Travis Baldree
- Cover artist: Carson Lowmiller
- Language: English
- Series: Legends & Lattes
- Genre: Fantasy
- Publisher: Cryptid Press
- Publication date: February 22, 2022
- Publication place: United States
- Media type: Print (paperback), ebook
- Pages: 316
- ISBN: 9798985663211
- Followed by: Bookshops & Bonedust

Legends & Lattes is a fantasy novel written by American author Travis Baldree. It was first published by Cryptid Press on February 22, 2022; a second edition was issued in trade paperback by Tor Books in November of the same year, with the first British edition issued in hardcover and ebook by Tor UK in the same month. The second edition includes an added prequel story, "Pages to Fill: A Legends & Lattes Story".

The novel was a finalist for the 2022 Goodreads Choice Award for Best Fantasy, the 2023 Nebula Award for Best Novel, and the 2023 Hugo Award for Best Novel.

The prequel Bookshops and Bonedust was published in November 2023.

== Plot ==
Orc swordswoman and mercenary Viv has long made a rough living as one of a band of adventurers—dandyish elf Fennus, dwarf Roon, stone-fey Taivus, and gnome Gallina. Viv dreams of retiring from adventure and opening a coffee shop, in preference to the more customary Orc retirement plan of dying in battle. The band's latest foray, against a Scalvert Queen, a spider-like monster and hoarder of treasure, offers her the opportunity. Claiming as her sole share of the treasure the Scalvert's Stone the monster has grown in its skull, Viv quits the group.

A Scalvert's Stone is reputed to bring fortune to its owner. Purchasing an abandoned stable in the town of Thune, Viv buries the stone inside and sets about realizing her dream. She recruits hob carpenter Calamity "Cal" to help her get the property in shape, and artistic succubus Tandri as a work-mate with whom to open and run the business. Subsequent recruits include ratkin Thimble, a genius baker, hesitant would-be bard Pendry, who blossoms into an entertainer, and volunteer watch beast Amity the dire-cat.

After a slow start, the Legends & Lattes coffee shop becomes highly popular in Thune, with regulars among the clientele such as witch Laney, student Hemmington, and magician gnome Durias, who appears to have a peculiar relationship with time. Viv and Tandri's success garners unwanted attention from the Madrigal, whose thugs run the local protection racket, and Viv's ex-colleague Fennus, who suspects the true nature of the seemingly modest share she claimed of the Scalvert's treasure. With the aid of the rest of Viv's old band, notably Taivus, matters with the Madrigal are resolved, but Fennus is implacable, making two attempts to steal the Scalvert's Stone, the second of which results in the cafe's destruction in a magical blaze.

With support from the friends Viv has made, Legends & Lattes is eventually rebuilt and soon thriving more than ever, despite the loss of the stone. Fennus, however, fares less well with his prize. It seems the powers of the Scalvert's Stone have been misrepresented. It doesn't bring good fortune, but rather attracts to its bearer others of like mind. To Viv, striving to build a good thing in her community, it brought helpers. To malignant, selfish Fennus it draws individuals of a different sort.

== Second edition bonus story ==
The Tor edition includes an added prequel short story, "Pages to Fill: A Legends & Lattes Story". It relates one of the final adventures of Viv's band prior to hunting the Scalvert Queen. In the gnomish city of Azimuth, they are tasked with capturing the dapplegrim (shapeshifter) Bodkin, a legendary thief, and recovering property she stole. Bodkin escapes but leaves behind a satchel containing bottles of paint.

The crew splits up to learn what they can from this material, Viv and Gallina visiting the local Athenaeum to pinpoint where one bottle might have been bought. Viv, already contemplating her retirement, takes the opportunity to research scalverts while there, filling her notebook with new information.

The two follow the trail of the paint to the dwelling of Leyton, a clockmaker, with whom Bodkin lives in the guise of his elfin lover Valeya. Viv secures the booty the band had been hired to recover before Bodkin returns. In a final struggle with the thief, Viv learns the dapplegrim had actually given up thievery for Leyton's sake, and considering her own dreams decides to let her go.

Afterwards, Viv and Gallina pass a café, a relatively new business in town, and go in. When served a cup of coffee, Viv's dream for her the next phase of her life comes into focus.

== Reception ==
Publishers Weekly characterized the novel as "a gentle little cozy set against an epic fantasy backdrop", noting that "[t]his charming outing will please anyone who’s ever wished to spend time in a fantasy world without all the quests and battles".

Sarah Rice in Booklist called the book "a novel, and shop, that will delight anyone who enjoys coffee shop alternate universes, slow-burn romances, and the vindication of friendship". She felt that "[t]his setup combined with the positive messages of defying societal stereotypes, letting go of violence to build peace, and trusting in your friends feels like a premise from Terry Pratchett's Discworld".

== Graphic Novel ==
A graphic novel adaption of Legends & Lattes, adapted by Samuel Sattin and illustrated by Shanti Rittgers and Sarah Webb, will be published by Ten Speed Graphic on October 6, 2026.
