= Matt Dinniman =

American science fantasy writer

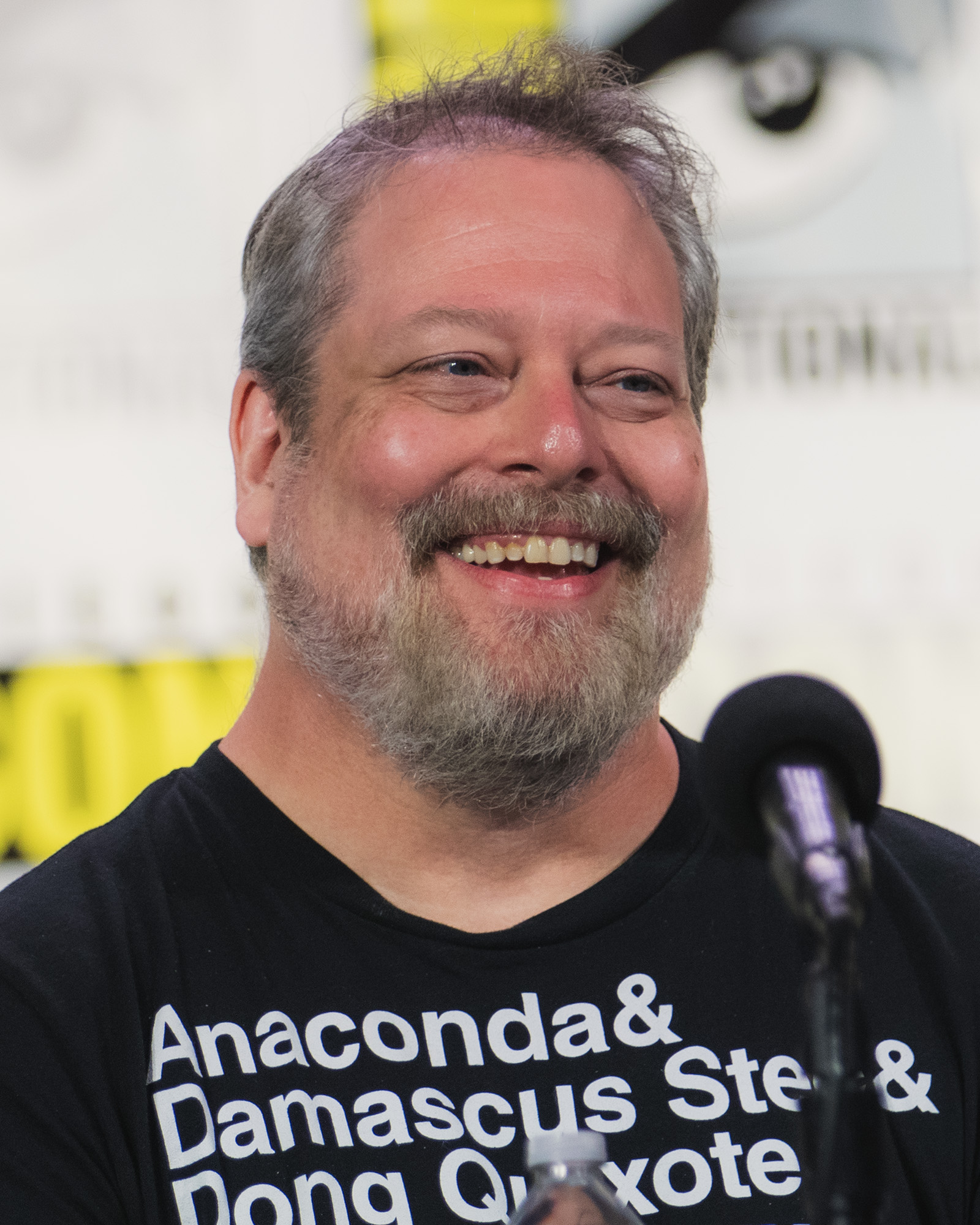
- Dinniman in 2026 at San Diego Comic-Con
- Born: c. 1974
- Education: University of Arizona (BA)
- Occupation: Writer
- Writing career
- Language: English
- Genres: Fantasy, science fiction, litRPG
- Notable work: Dungeon Crawler Carl series
- Website: mattdinniman.com

Matt Dinniman (born c. 1974) is an American author known for the science fantasy LitRPG book series Dungeon Crawler Carl and the science-fiction novel Operation Bounce House.

== Early life ==
Dinniman was born around 1974. His father was in the U.S. Army and the family frequently moved. Dinniman considered himself a "military brat". He read numerous books and began writing as a child. After Dinniman’s father retired from the Army, the family settled in Tucson, Arizona, where Dinniman attended and graduated from Sabino High School. He started his first novel while he was a senior in high school, which formed the basis of his The Shivered Sky trilogy, released in 2003. He graduated from the University of Arizona with a Bachelor of Arts in public administration and later took courses in creative writing at Pima Community College, which furthered his interest in being a writer.

After college he had a job at a newspaper in Yakima, Washington, writing obituaries. To advance his career at the paper, he lied about being skilled in Adobe Photoshop which in turn led him to realize he had an artistic side. He used this to travel to pet shows and draw art of pets for their owners.

== Career ==
While running his art booths at pet shows, Dinniman published several works during the 2010s, such as The Grinding and two entries in the as-of-yet unfinished A Dominion of Blades series. During the downtime from the pet shows, Dinniman began writing Dungeon Crawler Carl, part of which was inspired by a tortoise-shell persian cat he had seen at one show, establishing the character of Princess Donut. Starting in 2019, he published chapters of his work on Royal Road, an online platform for publishing web novels and fan fiction, which quickly gained popularity on the site's charts. When the COVID-19 pandemic happened, pet shows were cancelled, and Dinniman began to self-publish Dungeon Crawler Carl on Amazon in 2020 as to make income from his writings. The following year, an audiobook adaptation narrated by Jeff Hays was released through Soundbooth Theater. The series was picked up for publication through Penguin Random House, which released the series through their Ace Books imprint. The publisher only holds the print rights to the series; the e-book and audiobook rights were retained by Dinniman. As of 2026, eight books in the series have been published, and Dinniman plans two more to complete the series.

In 2026 Dinniman published Operation Bounce House through Ace Books in digital and print format. The audiobook was released through Penguin Audio and is narrated by Travis Baldree and Jeff Hays. The novel is a standalone work and not part of the Dungeon Crawler Carl series. It won the 2026 Dragon Award for Best Science Fiction Novel.

Dungeon Crawler Carl was nominated, but did not win, for the 2026 Arthur C. Clarke Award.

== Personal life ==
During the 2010s, Dinniman and his wife settled in the Pacific Northwest, first a year at Bainbridge Island, Washington before moving to Gig Harbor, Washington. Around 2026, he began a move back to Tucson to live closer to his mother and his wife's family, opting for a gated community due to the number of fans that have sought him out at his Gig Harbor home. They have four children.

== Published works ==
=== Dungeon Crawler Carl ===
1. Dungeon Crawler Carl (2020)
2. Carl's Doomsday Scenario (2021)
3. The Dungeon Anarchist's Cookbook (2021)
4. The Gate of the Feral Gods (2021)
5. The Butcher's Masquerade (2022)
6. The Eye of the Bedlam Bride (2023)
7. This Inevitable Ruin (2024)
8. A Parade of Horribles (2026)

=== The Shivered Sky ===
1. Every Grain of Sand (2003, republished 2020)
2. In The City of Demons (2003, republished 2020)
3. The Great Devouring Darkness (2003, republished 2020)

=== Dominion of Blades ===
1. Dominion of Blades (2017)
2. The Hobgoblin Riot (2018)
3. The Thieves of Grandeur (TBA)

=== Other works ===
- Trailer Park Fairy Tales (2005)
- The Grinding (2013)
- Kaiju: Battlefield Surgeon (2019)
- Operation Bounce House (2026)
