= Travis Baldree =

American author and video game designer (born 1977)

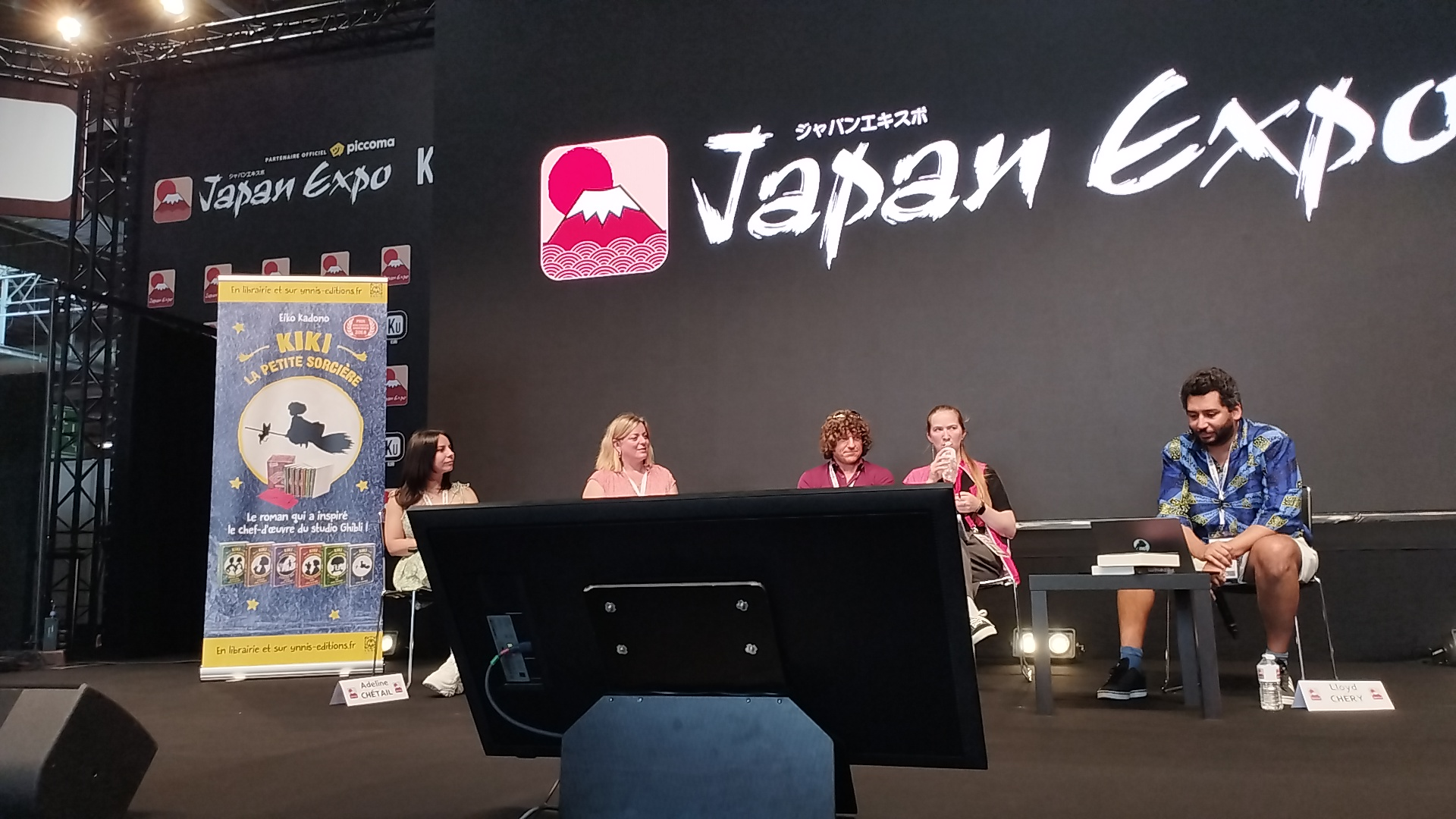
- Baldree at Japan Expo 2024
- Born: Travis Baldree; 1977 (age 48–49); Nacogdoches, Texas, U.S.
- Occupations: Author, audiobook narrator, videogame developer
- Website: www.travisbaldree.com

Travis Baldree (born 1977) is an American author, audiobook narrator, and video game designer. He is best known for the video game Torchlight (2009), for narrating the audiobooks of the Cradle series by Will Wight, and for his novel Legends & Lattes (2022), which won the Astounding Award for Best New Writer.

== Early life ==
Baldree was born in Nacogdoches, Texas in 1977. He lived in Eden, Texas, before moving to Colfax, Washington. Baldree later recalled that he wanted to grow up to be a writer.

== Career ==
=== Game development ===
Baldree went to college at Washington State University before leaving to work as a software engineer and game developer. Beginning in 1998, Baldree designed and made video games, such as Torchlight, Rebel Galaxy and Fate.

Baldree co-founded Runic Games and Double Damage Games. He later described his work in game development as focusing on engineering and company management, not storytelling.

=== Narration ===
Baldree later began narrating audiobooks as a hobby. In his 40s he switched into audiobook narration as a full-time career. He said he was frequently cast for fantasy action-adventure novels but enjoyed narrating fantasy romance books on the rare occasions he got them. He narrated all twelve entries of the Cradle series by Will Wight, including The New York Times audio monthly best sellers Bloodline, Reaper, Dreadgod and Waybound. Paul Constant of The Seattle Times described him as "an in-demand narrator of audiobooks."

=== Writing ===
In 2021, Baldree participated in NaNoWriMo with a fellow narrator and writer, Aven Shore-Kind. Baldree recounts that over 26 days, he wrote most of what would become his debut novel. Because it was during the COVID-19 pandemic, the themes of the book reflected his desire for escapism in media in the vein of The Great British Bake Off or the fantasy romances he enjoyed narrating. The book became Legends & Lattes, which he self-published on Amazon in 2022. It was later published by Tor. The book's protagonist, Viv, is an orc swordswoman retiring from adventuring in order to open a coffee shop. Romance and business conflicts follow as the shop grows.

Legends & Lattes was a finalist for the 2023 Hugo Award for Best Novel and earned Baldree the 2023 Astounding Award for Best New Writer. He also narrated its audiobook (for which he was nominated for an Audie Award for Fantasy). Booklist gave the novel a starred review, and reviewer Sarah Rice compared the book's positive messages to Discworld stories. Publishers Weekly described it as a "charming" and "gentle" tale.

Baldree released a prequel titled Bookshops & Bonedust in November 2023. In the book, Viv is healing from battle with a necromancer in the town of Murk when she meets Fern, a cross between a human and a rat whose bookstore is falling into disrepair. As Viv helps Fern fix her shop, their relationship grows, but the necromancer threatens to upset their peace. Adrienne Martini, for Locus, described the book as "the story equivalent of a warm blanket on a bleak day" with "direct and engaging" prose and simple stakes. Bookshops & Bonedust became a finalist for the 2024 Washington State Book Awards in Fiction.

Baldree describes his series as "cozy fantasy", which focuses on everyday moments in the style of speculative fiction and fantasy. He believes that casting seemingly-mundane problems in the lens of cozy fantasy tales helps to remind readers that these issues do matter and facing them is meaningful.

In 2024, Baldree released a short story, "Goblins & Greatcoats" via Subterranean Press. In it, a goblin named Zyll shelters at an inn and tries to solve a mystery between the guests. Charles Payseur, reviewing for Locus, praised the story for its pacing, characterization and plot twists.

Baldree is voicing Lindon and Eithan in the upcoming Cradle animatic.

== Awards ==
Work	Year	Award	Category	Result	Ref.
Legends & Lattes	2022	Nebula Award	Best Novel	Nominated	
Legends & Lattes	2022	Goodreads Choice Award	Fantasy	Nominated	
Legends & Lattes	2023	Hugo Award	Best Novel	Nominated	
Legends & Lattes	2023	Locus Award	First Novel	Nominated	
Legends & Lattes	2023	Audie Award	Fantasy	Nominated	
Legends & Lattes	2023	Washington State Book Award	Fiction	Nominated	
Legends & Lattes	2023	RUSA CODES Reading List	Fantasy	Nominated	
Bookshops & Bonedust	2023	Goodreads Choice Award	Fantasy	Nominated	
Bookshops & Bonedust	2024	Mythopoeic Fantasy Award	Adult Literature	Nominated	
Bookshops & Bonedust	2024	Washington State Book Award	Fiction	Nominated	
Bookshops & Bonedust	2025	Audie Award	Fantasy	Won	
Bookshops & Bonedust	2025	Audie Award	Narration by the Author	Nominated	
Brigands & Breadknives	2025	Goodreads Choice Award	Fantasy	Nominated	
	2023	Astounding Award for Best New Writer		Won	

== Personal life ==
Baldree lived in Seattle, Washington while working in game development but later moved to Spokane, Washington.

== Bibliography ==
- Legends & Lattes (2022)
- "Pages to Fill" (2022)
- Bookshops & Bonedust (2023)
- Goblins & Greatcoats (2024)
- Brigands & Breadknives (2025)
