= Dungeon Crawler Carl =

Science fantasy novel series by Matt Dinniman

- Cover used for the ebook, audiobook, and self-published version of the first entry, featuring Carl (right) and Donut (bottom left). Art by Luciano Fleitas
- Dungeon Crawler Carl (2020); Carl's Doomsday Scenario (2021); The Dungeon Anarchist's Cookbook (2021); The Gate of the Feral Gods (2021); The Butcher's Masquerade (2022); The Eye of the Bedlam Bride (2023); This Inevitable Ruin (2024); A Parade of Horribles (2026)
- Author: Matt Dinniman
- Cover artist: Luciano Fleitas
- Country: United States
- Language: English
- Genre: LitRPG, Science fantasy
- Publisher: Ace Books
- Published: 2020–present
- Media type: Print (hardcover and paperback), audiobook, e-book
- No. of books: 8 (2 more underway)

Dungeon Crawler Carl is a science fantasy LitRPG book series written by American author Matt Dinniman. Initially self-published by Dinniman via online publisher Royal Road, it and its seven sequels were acquired by Ace Books in 2024.

The series follows Carl and his ex-girlfriend's cat, Princess Donut, two of the few survivors of an alien corporation's takeover of Earth for the mining, transporting, processing, and consumption of its resources, as they are forced to compete in a dungeon crawl recreated from those resources for an intergalactic reality show program. The eighth book was released in May 2026, with plans to complete the series with one additional volume split across two books.

As of November 2026, the first eight books have sold more than twenty million copies, with its popularity aided by the audiobook, performed by Jeff Hays of Soundbooth Theater, which had sold over ten million copies by the same time. Additionally, a television adaptation has been greenlit for production by Peacock, and there are further plans for graphic novels, a card game, and a tabletop role-playing game.

== Premise ==
Carl, a United States Coast Guard veteran, and Princess Donut, his ex-girlfriend's cat, are part of a few million beings that escape the elimination of the human species and mining of Earth's resources by one of several corporations that run the galaxy-spanning Syndicate (the galactic government). In an attempt to survive the world-ending event, they enter the World Dungeon, an eighteen-level dungeon crawl borrowing ideas from tabletop role-playing and video games, reconstructed from Earth's resources. The efforts to survive by Carl and other survivors, referred to as "crawlers", are live-streamed across the universe as a game show called Dungeon Crawler World: Earth, a process that has been used for numerous seasons by the Syndicate to fund the mining operations of other planets. Among the rewards Carl earns for entering the dungeon is an enchanted pet biscuit. Donut snatches the biscuit from Carl's hand and she becomes sapient, able to talk and use magic.

Carl and Donut meet several other crawlers, non-player characters (NPC for short), and aliens, some of whom become their allies. On their journey, the crawlers must select a character race and class and fight mobs, bosses, and gods. They are rewarded with new gear, experience points, and improved attributes all in an effort to become stronger and survive the deeper levels of the dungeon. The dungeon itself is run by a "System AI" that provides crawlers with information, sets difficulties, and distributes loot boxes via achievements. On each level, crawlers have a limited amount of time to reach the stairs to the next dungeon level before they are killed when the current level collapses. As part of Dungeon Crawler World, crawlers seek popularity with the audience to gain sponsors that can provide them with better gear that is critical for survival. Survivors of the ninth floor and beyond can accept deals, typically indentureships to serve as NPCs in several future seasons of the Crawl, to one day become citizens of the Syndicate. Carl, Donut, and other crawlers vow to fight back against the Syndicate to reclaim Earth and end the Crawl for good. During their fight, they learn that the increasingly-erratic System AI is threatening the fate of the known universe.

== Characters ==
A plush toy representation of Princess Donut

- Carl, a Coast Guard veteran who enters the World Dungeon without shoes or pants.
- Princess Donut, a sapient tortoiseshell Persian cat and a former cat show champion who belonged to Carl's ex-girlfriend Beatrice (Bea).
- The System AI, the aggregate intelligence which is running and administering the current edition of the crawl that has knowledge of human pop culture.
- Mordecai, a former crawler nearing the end of his tenure, serving as Carl and Donut's tutorial guide, and later as Donut's manager. His changeling race forces him to change his form on every floor.
- Members of Team Meadow Lark, employees and residents of a nursing home who Carl befriends. This includes nurses Imani and Yolanda, handymen and brothers Brandon and Chris, and elderly resident Elle.
- Katia Grim, an Icelandic art professor who selects a shape-changing doppelgänger race and joins Carl and Donut's party.
- Mongo, a Velociraptor that Donut gains as a pet.
- Samantha, a violent, chaotic, and obscene demi-goddess trapped in the head of a sex doll.
- Rend, a Tummy Acher (a sentient creature with a round, tough body and legs that overall looks like a meat ball) that Carl is given as a pet from another crawler.
- Miriam Dom, an Italian goatherd, and Prepotente, a goat from her flock who was transformed into a humanoid, sapient goat at the start of the dungeon.
- Zev, a fish-like alien race called Kua-Tin, who works for the Borant Corporation as a dungeon admin and serves as Carl and Donut's public relations manager.
- Odette, a former crawler and host of one of the more popular talk shows associated with the dungeon who discreetly helps Carl.
- Lucia Mar, a South American crawler. Around 13 years of age, the youngest crawler in the dungeon, with an apparent split personality. She is accompanied by her two Rottweiler dogs.
- Florin, a former mercenary soldier crawler who chooses a crocodile-like race. He claims to be from France, but has an Australian accent.
- Daniel Bautista, a tigrin race crawler believed to be from the Philippines known for his collection of beanie baby-like magical creatures and who falls in love with Katia.
- Firas and Louis, two laid-back crawlers Carl meets on the fifth floor, whom Carl helps to groom into competent crawlers.
- Li Jun, Li Na and Zhang, a trio of Chinese crawlers and former warehouse workers who Carl befriends. Li Jun and Li Na are brother and sister, while Zhang is Li Jun's best friend who is also secretly in love with Li Na.
- Juice Box, a changeling NPC who spearheads an NPC revolt.
- Quasar, Carl's lawyer and a grey-like alien known as a Nullian.
- Scolopendra, a giant centipede that acts as the overall dungeon boss, which crawlers must kill to be able to leave the 18th floor. When awakened, she emits her nine-tier attack that can target all living creatures in the dungeon with devastating results.

== Development ==
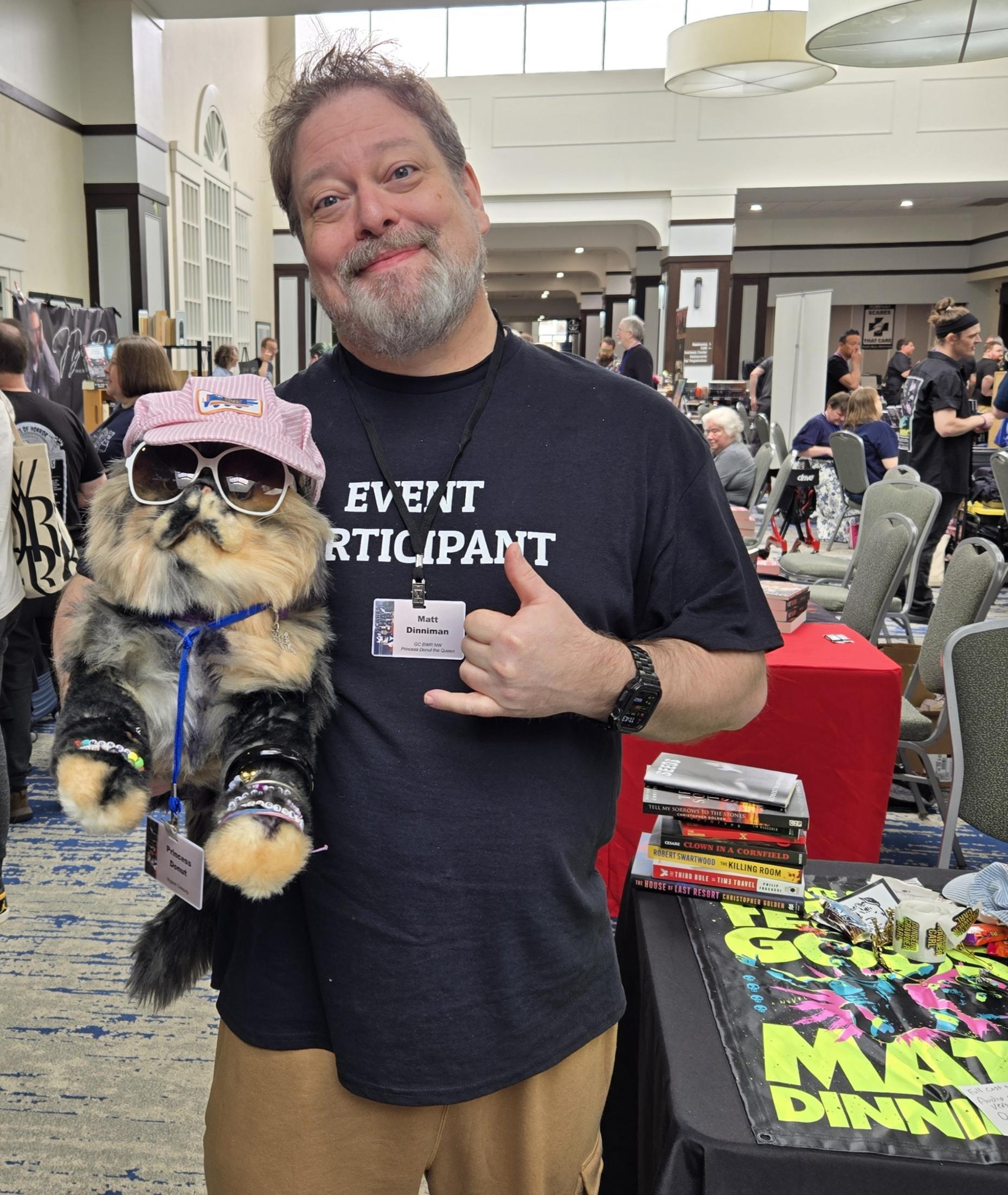
Matt Dinniman at the 2025 AuthorCon in Williamsburg, Virginia, holding a plush of Princess Donut

Prior to writing the series, Matt Dinniman had made his living going to cat shows and drawing illustrations of cats for their owners. During his breaks, he began writing short segments of the story via the digital platform Royal Road in 2019, where it quickly gained popularity. When the COVID-19 pandemic hit in 2020, most of the cat shows were cancelled, and Dinniman switched to writing the series full-time, as well as using Amazon for self-publishing.

While writing the series, Dinniman drew upon his experience playing MMOs such as RuneScape, as well as the concept of in-game chatting, which he noted "adds another element because there's all these different dynamics happening at once." Prior to writing the series, Dinniman developed a desire to write a novel with a death-game setting; he also wanted to include a tortoiseshell-colored Persian cat after seeing one at a cat show where he was working as an artist. Dinniman has said he did not initially plan for the cat to be sapient, and that this developed as he continued writing the series, as he tends to create and embellish the story as he goes. This eventually led to the creation of Princess Donut as she is presented in the series, a character that Dinniman has stated is vital to the series. Dinniman is known for his interaction with his fanbase and allows his Patreon subscribers to impact some limited elements of the story by voting on the outcome of external factors, such as loot box content, or to have much of The Eye of the Bedlam Bride taking place in Cuba.

The series includes dark and comedic elements. In an interview with Grimdark Magazine, Dinniman stated that it was difficult to maintain the balance between these two elements and that rather than automatically write a comedic scene after each dark one, he instead relies "on the characters themselves to get from point A to B, and humor is oftentimes a major coping mechanism." Dinniman initially kept track of the series' characters and storylines via a spreadsheet that grew up to 198 pages, requiring the use of a second spreadsheet to track the content on the first. The size of the spreadsheet eventually crashed Dinniman's computer, causing the author to hire someone to create a Notion database for better ease of use. While working on the manuscript for A Parade of Horribles Dinniman reported that he wrote for about eight to twelve hours a day, which he spent in his home as well as at bars and coffee shops.

In 2024, Dinniman stated that he planned for the series to span ten books, but that "nothing is set in stone". Dinniman confirmed his plans to end the series with the ninth book, split across two works, in a February 2026 interview.

== Publication history ==
=== Initial publication and Ace Books ===
Dinniman began publishing Dungeon Crawler Carl on Royal Road in 2020. He self-published the first book in the series on Amazon on October 2, 2020, in ebook and paperback format. He would continue in this form until 2024, when print rights to the series were picked up by Penguin Random House, which released the first volume through the Ace Books publishing wing in mid-2024, while Dinniman was able to retain the digital publication rights. Ebook rights to the series are still held by Dinniman, who continues to self-publish digitally through Amazon. As of May 2026, eight novels in the series have been published, most self-published before the series was picked up by Ace Books.

In response to questions about whether the publisher would make changes to the series, Dinniman responded that the story would remain the same but that the series had undergone rigorous edits, and that the releases would contain parts of a bonus in-universe novella, Backstage at the Pineapple Cabaret.

=== Audiobooks ===
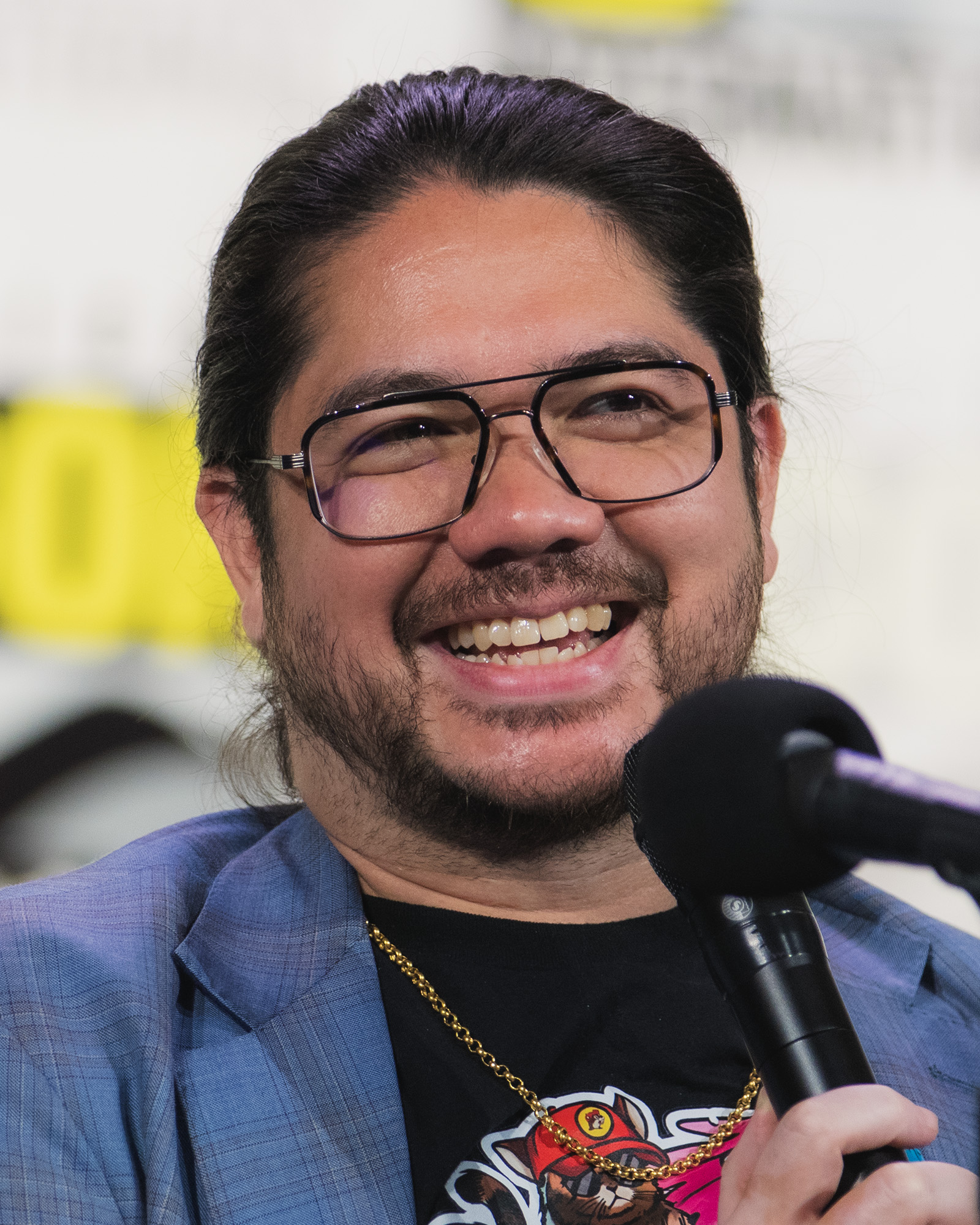
Jeff Hays in 2026

The main audiobook adaptations of the Dungeon Crawler Carl series have been narrated by Jeff Hays, who has produced the adaptations via his company Soundbooth Theater. Dinniman and Hays had met at an audiobook awards ceremony sometime before Dinniman had started work on the series, and became friends, leading to Dinniman reaching out to Hays for the audiobook versions of Dungeon Crawler Carl. Outside of a few guest voices, Hays voices all the characters in the books, around 200 as of the eighth book, all with different tone, pitches, and accents. Dinniman has stated that Hays's narration of female characters, particularly Princess Donut, is so convincing that he has had people ask him if Annie Ellicott, a Soundbooth Theater artist, was an uncredited narrator for the first book. Guest narrators include Travis Baldree and Patrick Warburton in book six.

Per Dinniman, sales of the audiobook adaptations of the novels have surpassed the physical and e-book copies of the series, and much of his fanbase first experienced the series via Audible.

In addition to the main audiobook version, the series has a separate production called an "Audio Immersion Tunnel", with a full-cast, original sound effects and music. According to the author, these will not replace the existing audiobooks and are a separate product.

=== Series entries ===
No.	Title	Release date	Dungeon floor(s)	Pages	Audio length	ISBN
1	Dungeon Crawler Carl	September 21, 2020 (paperback); October 2, 2020 (Kindle)	1 & 2	444	13 hrs 31 mins	979-8688591507
Carl and Donut enter the dungeon and meet Mordecai, who teaches them the rules of the dungeon and their best path to survive. Carl and Donut face several bosses during the first two floors, during which Donut gains Mongo as a pet. Carl learns that he and Donut are among the most popular crawlers on Dungeon Crawler World, gaining interview appearances with Odette, along with meeting Zev. On another interview show, Carl insults Maestro, a younger member of the royal family of the orc-based Skull Empire, who vows revenge on Carl. Donut gains a magic tiara, the Enchanted Crown of the Sepsis Whore, which gives her additional powers but requires her to kill all royal members of the Blood Sultanate by the ninth floor in order to descend further.
2	Carl's Doomsday Scenario	January 2, 2021	3	362	11 hrs 28 mins	979-8588333764
On the third floor, the surviving crawlers select their race and class. Carl selects the Compensated Anarchist class, while Donut opts for the Former Child Actor class, which allows Mordecai to become her manager and provide them with more information and assistance on the dungeon. They find themselves in a more open-world scenario with cities surrounded by wasteland. Despite Mordecai's caution against accepting quests, Carl gets sucked into a third-party quest line. During a roundtable program, he meets another top crawler, Hekla, who asks Carl to help one of her party, Katia, now a shapeshifter and located near Carl, to level up. Carl agrees, but narrowly escapes an assassination attempt by Maestro during the program. In completing another quest, Carl damages a powerful soul crystal threatening to kill crawlers for miles around, but captures it in a magic container moments before it explodes, becoming the titular "Carl's Doomsday Scenario" item in his inventory.
3	The Dungeon Anarchist's Cookbook	March 19, 2021	4	532	16 hrs 54 mins	979-8724495066
On the fourth floor, the surviving crawlers fight through the "Iron Tangle", a complex maze of underground trains and subways. The crawlers also get their first sponsors' loot box; Carl's fan box gives him a choice of prizes, and he selects what appears to be a simple cookbook. Due to his class, he can read special information about the dungeon written into it by previous crawlers. The various groups find they must collaborate on their knowledge of the Tangle to find and clear a path to the stairs. Carl, Donut, and Katia join up with Hekla's group to clear out one of the tunnels. When Donut reveals that Hekla was trying to kill Katia, Katia inadvertently kills Hekla and retrieves her magical crossbow, which was the source of Hekla's power, and her second-in-command and Katia's former friend, Eva, vows revenge. As the Tangle falls into chaos near the end of the level with many crawlers trapped a distance from any stairs, Carl risks summoning the god sponsored by Maestro to kill the level's major boss and open the path to the fifth floor.
4	The Gate of the Feral Gods	June 14, 2021	5	584	18 hrs 3 mins	979-8520410171
The remaining crawlers are distributed among bubble worlds, each requiring four bosses to be killed to "pop" the bubble and access the stairs. Carl, Donut, and Katia find that their bubble includes the parts for the Gate of the Feral Gods, an artifact that can open portals to any location, including other floors, but which summons a feral god at the entrance portal. During one of their interviews, Carl discreetly causes the death of a dungeon admin and learns that several other admins have been killed already this season. Carl's group acquires Samantha, a demi-goddess trapped in the head of a sex doll, during the process of clearing their bubble. After successfully opening their bubble, Carl's group works with others using the Gate to help them escape to the next floor, though Carl is forced to become a worshiper of Emberus, the god of fire, and accept a quest to find the murderer of Emberus's son by the end of the 11th floor or receive a fatal smite. Before leaving, Carl's group uses the Gate one last time to flood out a good portion of the main city on the ninth floor where Faction Wars will occur, which will make it harder for alien hunters to kill them once they reach it.
5	The Butcher's Masquerade	February 19, 2022	6 & 7	730	23 hrs 33 mins	979-8418566102
The sixth floor, the Hunting Grounds, allows over a thousand alien hunters to enter the dungeon and kill crawlers for rewards, though they are themselves fair game for the crawlers. Carl is forced to give up the Gate until later in the dungeon, but with Quasar's help, is able to coerce special benefits, including a spell that will send allied NPCs to the ninth floor to prepare for Faction Wars. As Carl and the other crawlers methodically work to take out the hunters, they prepare for a giant ball, the Butcher's Masquerade, to be held for the top crawlers just before the level collapses. Carl suspects it to be a trap to kill them off, and with his friends defeats a major boss at the end of the ball, though many of the crawlers die in battle. With the help of Donut's fan club outside the dungeon, Carl is able to secure a place in the Faction Wars, and sends several NPCs ahead to the ninth floor to prepare. Katia kills Eva but Eva slaps the Crown of the Sepsis Whore on Katia as she dies, which means either Donut or Katia must kill the other to progress past the ninth floor. On entering the seventh floor, Prepotente deduces the nature of the floor from earlier clues and sponsor items received by Donut, and uses this to shortcut the floor, taking all survivors to the eighth floor prematurely.
6	The Eye of the Bedlam Bride	June 14, 2023	8	692	26 hrs 46 mins	979-8396866379
On the eighth floor, the remaining crawlers must battle using a Pokémon style card game, collecting totems to fight for them. At Samantha's insistence, they recruit Shi Maria, a giant spider-like creature also known as the Bedlam Bride, who claims she can help Samantha acquire a body. In the floor's second phase, each squad must acquire a key from a boss to unlock an exit, but the system AI, out of control of the admins and having placed a quarantine around the Earth solar system, breaks the rules and uses people from the crawlers' past to create these bosses, and several squads fail to get a key. Carl realizes the floor was designed to force squads to battle over keys and to significantly trim the remaining crawlers. Carl inadvertently causes a demon eviction event during the final phase, summoning numerous demons to the floor. Carl, using hints from the cookbook, designs a method to rescue all the surviving crawlers without keys, thus improving their chances in Faction Wars. While his plan works, Shi Maria invades Carl's body during combat and forces him to tattoo the Eye of the Bedlam Bride on his chest, ensuring her mind will remain with him as he descends deeper.
7	This Inevitable Ruin	November 7, 2024	9	722	28 hrs 40 mins	979-8344591230
The ninth floor features Faction Wars, where nine teams of mercenaries led by alien warlords attempt to defeat the others, normally conscripting any crawlers that reach the floor to be used as fodder. However, through Carl and Donut's actions, they have arranged to become the ninth faction and are able to bring most surviving crawlers onto their team, and align themselves with Juice Box and her team of NPCs brought from previous floors; he is also joined by thousands of former crawlers that have come to Earth to help fight against the Syndicate, led by previous writers of the Cookbook. Carl also was able to secure a rule change that leaves all the warlords vulnerable on this floor. Carl helps Katia kill the remaining Blood Sultanate members while systematically defeating the other warlords, leaving only the crawlers and the NPC teams left. They use a spell Carl exchanged for the Gate of the Feral Gods to transport the NPCs to the twelfth floor to prepare for the Ascendency, and Katia ingests a flower received as a sponsored box that grants her a gift from a goddess, to become pregnant and be forced out of the dungeon and sent to the kinder care facility on Earth's surface where the surviving children of Earth are being cared for, allowing Donut to be able to descend with Carl.
8	A Parade of Horribles	May 12, 2026	10 & 11	704	20h 26min	979-8217190065
On the tenth floor, the surviving crawlers compete across seven escalating vehicle races with audience-voted upgrades between heats. Using information from NPCs and the former crawlers, Carl arranges for over two hundred crawlers and allies to escape the playing field into a protected space called the Pineapple Cabaret created by one of the Cookbook authors. Most of the survivors of the floor accept deals, and only twenty-three crawlers descend to the eleventh floor. The eleventh floor opens with the Parade of Horribles, a procession that the System AI uses to explain its plan for vengeance on the Syndicate races for trying to control it and other similar primal AIs around the galaxy. The parade ends at a boss arena. Carl executes a plan with help from his allies, manipulating the god Taranis, Emberus's brother, to kill Emberus, freeing Carl of his quest. Carl simultaneously brings Scolopendra to the arena with the intent to make her a pet, giving them an edge to reach the eighteenth floor while avoiding her nine-tier attack. Donut accidentally uses the wrong transformation biscuit on the defeated Scolopendra, turning her into a sapient crawler party member. Nineteen crawlers proceed to the twelfth floor as the Ascendency battles begin.

=== Second publication ===
Starting in August 2024, Ace Books took over publishing the paperback and hardback versions of the books. Each book contains a passage of the multi-part novella Backstage at the Pineapple Cabaret.

No.	Title	Release Date	Pages	ISBN
1	Dungeon Crawler Carl	August 27, 2024	464	9780593820247
2	Carl's Doomsday Scenario	September 24, 2024	384	9780593820261
3	The Dungeon Anarchist's Cookbook	March 11, 2025	544	9780593820285
4	The Gate of the Feral Gods	March 11, 2025	608	9780593955970
5	The Butcher's Masquerade	April 8, 2025	720	9780593955994
6	The Eye of the Bedlam Bride	May 13, 2025	832	9780593956014
7	This Inevitable Ruin	September 23, 2025	880	9798217190041
8	A Parade of Horribles	May 12, 2026	704	9798217190065

== Reception ==
=== Reviews and accolades ===
In a review of the first book for Locus, Gabino Iglesias criticized some jokes and said he found the book repetitive, but wrote that "the important thing here is that the novel never becomes boring" and that the "shortcomings are easy to overlook". Tonya Cherry of CKRM favorably reviewed the series, praising the audiobook narration and calling the series "a wild ride that blends humor, action, and a touch of heart, making for an unforgettable journey."

The first book was nominated for the 2026 Arthur C. Clarke Award.

The seventh book in the series, This Inevitable Ruin, won the Best Science Fiction Novel in 2025 from Dragoncon, while the audiobook for the volume was listed in Audible's best 10 sci-fi audiobooks of 2025.

=== Sales ===
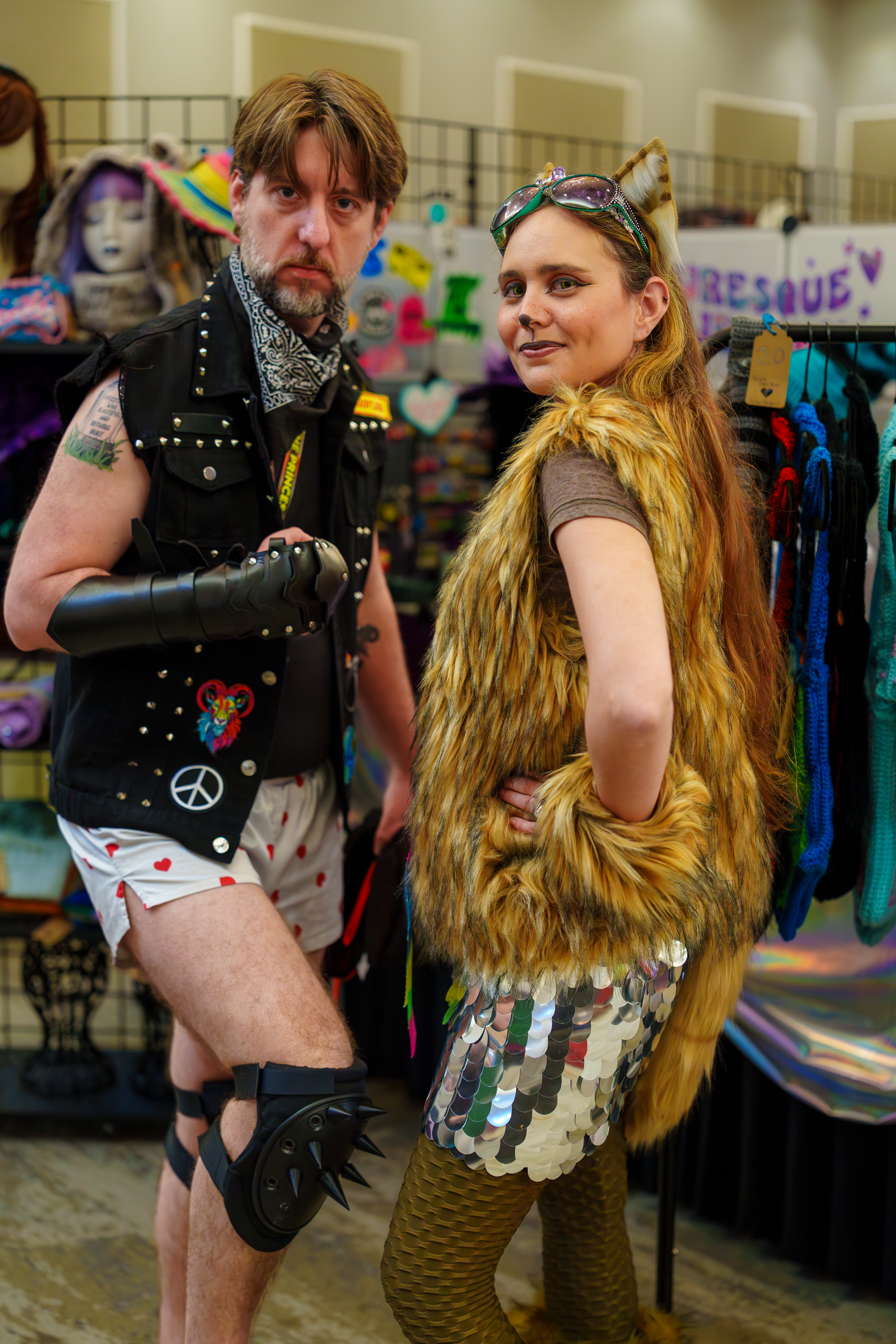
Dungeon Crawler Carl and Princess Donut cosplayers at Raven Con 2026 in Richmond, Virginia

As of December 2024, the first four books published by Ace had sold almost 55,000 copies. In March 2025, the seventh book in the series, This Inevitable Ruin, ranked #2 on The New York Times' Best Seller List for Audio Fiction, while the fourth book, The Gate of the Feral Gods, ranked #9 on the Best Seller List for Hardcover Fiction. In 2025, the bookstore chain Books-A-Million named the first entry in the series as its inaugural Book of the Year, which is to recognize a title that "best embodies the joy of reading and the enthusiasm of BAM's team". By July 2026, the first eight books had sold more than 14 million copies, while the Audible version of the audiobooks have been listened to for more than 140 million hours. The first book had sold more than 2.7 million by May 2026, and had been on the The New York Times Best Seller list for 19 straight weeks. By November 2026, over 20 million copies of the print version of the books, and over 10 million copies of the audiobooks had been sold. The sales of the books have drawn similar number of both men and women to the series, an anomaly in fiction which tends to be dominated by female readers, according to The Wall Street Journal.

=== Legacy ===
Dungeon Crawler Carl helped to popularize the LitRPG genre outside of its roots in southeast Asian culture. In a 2026 review, Laura Miller of Slate praised the Dungeon Crawler Carl series as a leading example in the LitRPG genre, noting the surprising emotional and political depth the gaming format was capable of when utilized as a metaphor. She wrote, "the crawlers' exploitation at the hands of a heartless entertainment industry, and the corporate skullduggery behind the scenes, become an increasingly rich and pointed analogy to the power imbalances of our own world."

The Colorado Avalanche held a Dungeon Crawler Carl night on April 11, 2026, prompted by the Avalanche's Scott Wedgewood, who had become a fan of the series during COVID. Dinniman was in attendance, and the event was used to support a local animal rescue in honor of the Princess Donut character.

The Oregon Coast Aquarium named a pair of giant Pacific octopuses added to the aquarium in 2026 as Donut and Juicebox based on the characters from the books.

Dinniman dedicated the first book to Fiona, a hippopotamus born prematurely and raised at the Cincinnati Zoo, which Dinnimin wrote as "one of the greatest, most inspiring, most amazing survival stories of our time". The zoo arranged for Dinniman to meet Fiona during a visit around May 2026.

== Adaptations ==
=== Television adaptation ===
In August 2024, it was announced that Universal International Studios, in collaboration with Seth MacFarlane's Fuzzy Door Productions, acquired the rights to adapt Dungeon Crawler Carl into a television series. Dinniman said that multiple studios were interested in the rights to the series, and once they had selected Universal, the studio recommended Fuzzy Door for production, as most of their staff were fans of the book. Dinniman expressed excitement about the adaptation, while Erica Huggins, President of Fuzzy Door, described the project as aligning with the company's vision for genre-bending storytelling. Christopher Yost wrote the series adaptation. By February 2026, Dinniman said that Yost had completed a few episodes, a streaming service had acquired the broadcast rights, and they were nearing the point where they would need to establish whether it would be live-action or animated, and set up contracts for production.

The show was confirmed to be a live-action adaptation for the Peacock service with development starting in April 2026. Dinniman, an executive producer for the show, said that he trusts MacFarlane's Fuzzy Door to make CGI elements, as expected for Princess Donut, to look good in live action given how shows like The Orville and Ted have come out. Peacock greenlit the series, rather than just a pilot episode, to start production in June 2026. Dinniman does not expect the show to be a scene-for-scene retelling of the books, as he said "each book alone would be multiple seasons if we did everything"; instead, Dinniman expects the show to be truthful to the tone of the books and the characters. He emphasized that for Carl and Donut, "[they] need to be as closely written to the book as possible in order for it to maintain its popularity amongst existing fans." Hays was confirmed to reprise his audiobook role as the voice of Princess Donut for the show. Dinniman said of casting Hays, which had been a popular choice among the series' fans, "We're trying to show the fans that we are listening, and we're doing our best to stay as true to the story as possible." Yost and Eric Heisserer were confirmed as the series showrunners in August 2026. Writing for the series started in September 2026, with filming anticipated to start in 2027.

=== Webcomic and comic series ===
In 2025, Dinniman announced that a webcomic adaptation of Dungeon Crawler Carl was in development and would be published through Webtoon. The project was done in partnership with Aethon Books' Webcomic Branch and Laurel Pursuit. The first episode was published on July 17, 2025. The episode was later distributed in physical format as part of Free Comic Book Day 2026. The webcomic is currently published in print format through Vault Comics, the first volume of which was published in May 2026.

A comic book series, adapting from the webtoon, will begin publishing in January 2027 by Vault Comics. Primary art will still be provided by Laurel Pursuit, expanded beyond the webcomic version for the comic series.

=== Graphic novel ===
Dungeon Crawler Carl: Crocodile is an upcoming graphic novel set in the Dungeon Crawler Carl universe that will be published by Vault Comics. Plans for the book, which will be part of the series canon, were announced in August 2025; the following month, Vault Comics revealed that the graphic novel would follow the Crocodilian mercenary Florin DuPont and would be named Dungeon Crawler Carl: Crocodile. Michael Moreci and Brett Bean have been selected to work on the graphic novel's story and artwork. Funding for the graphic novel was raised via a crowdfunding campaign. The campaign was successful, raising $2.6 million against a $50,000 goal. The graphic novel is set to be released in March 2027.

=== Games ===
On July 29, 2025, Renegade Game Studios announced that they had partnered with Dinniman to develop a tabletop role-playing game set in the Dungeon Crawler Carl universe. The game is scheduled to release in 2026. Renegade also announced plans to develop board games and deck-building games for the series in the future. Renegade launched a BackerKit crowdfunding campaign for both the tabletop RPG and Unstoppable, a deck-building game using a ruleset similar to Mystic Vale, on April 14, 2026, with over $4.5 million raised on its first day, and nearing $10 million before it closed.

=== Merchandise ===
Playmates Toys is producing several lines of toys, figurines, trading cards, and other goods based on the series, set for initial release around July 2026. Maeve Chocolate (formerly Seattle Chocolates) partnered with Dinniman to make a non-alcoholic "Virgin Dirty Shirley" flavored bar, based on a beverage Princess Donut comes to prefer while in the dungeon, with packaging themed around Dungeon Crawler Carl.
