= An Encyclopedia of Claims, Frauds, and Hoaxes of the Occult and Supernatural =

1995 book by James Randi

- Author: James Randi with foreword by Arthur C. Clarke
- Language: English
- Subject: Scientific skepticism
- Publisher: St. Martin's Press
- Publication date: 1995
- Publication place: United States of America
- Media type: Hardcover/Paperback
- Pages: 284
- ISBN: 0-312-10974-1
- OCLC: 29953440
- Dewey Decimal: 001.903

An Encyclopedia of Claims, Frauds, and Hoaxes of the Occult and Supernatural (Note: Full title An Encyclopedia of Claims, Frauds, and Hoaxes of the Occult and Supernatural: James Randi’s Decidedly Skeptical Definitions of Alternate Realities) is a 1995 book by the conjuror and paranormal investigator James Randi, with a foreword by Arthur C. Clarke. It serves as a reference for a variety of topics within pseudoscience, the paranormal, and hoaxes. The Encyclopedia received generally positive reviews. In 2006, Randi made the work available free online.

== Background ==
James Randi was a Canadian-American magician, escape artist, author, and scientific skeptic. Randi had a varied career, performing stage magic, mentalism, escape acts, and other illusions. After seriously injuring himself in an escape act, Randi quit escapism and stage magic. He subsequently devoted more of his time towards investigation of the paranormal, publishing several books on the topic including Flim-Flam! (1982), The Truth About Uri Geller (1982), The Faith Healers (1987), and The Mask of Nostradamus (1990). Randi's Encyclopedia, which is his final book, is presented as "a guide to the many subjects that are usually included in the 'supernatural' category". It was written in the wake of a legal dispute, the financial burden of which had been "very ruinous" and took time away from his investigations.

== Contents ==
In his introduction, Randi notes that "[t]hough it is not widely accepted or even well known to the public, it is a fact that no occult, paranormal, psychic, or supernatural claim has ever been substantiated by proper testing". According to Randi, other encyclopedias on the paranormal have been compiled by "undiscriminating and rather naive authors" and are characterised by "[u]nquestioning belief in every sort of unproven claim of magical, occult, and mystical notions". He further remarks that these volumes "can give students only the affirmative view of subjects that have often actually been long ago disproved". Randi thus wrote his Encyclopedia as an alternative to these volumes. The Encyclopedia contains more than 600 entries, many of which are cross-referenced and/or illustrated. A range of topics are covered, including

- spiritualism
- mentalism
- cryptozoology
- pseudoscience
- alternative medicine
- parapsychology
- quackery
- occultism
- hoaxes

The book also includes a foreword by science fiction writer Arthur C. Clarke, who describes himself as an "awestruck fan" of Randi. Randi had previously appeared on Clarke's 1985 television series Arthur C. Clarke's World of Strange Powers, where he demonstrated "how psychic surgeons, spoon-benders, and mind-readers achieve their effects".

== Reception ==
In a review for the scientific journal Nature, Walter Gratzer described Randi's Encyclopedia as an "excellent compendium", praising it for being "copiously cross-referenced" and for "unearth[ing] many strange historical episodes". However, Gratzer also wrote that Randi "missed a few opportunities" by making only brief mention of scientology and not including entries for Alister Hardy, the Urantia cult, or Rupert Sheldrake. A review published in several newspapers praised Randi's "ability to deflate the practitioners of the occult in understated prose". In The Manhattan Mercury, R. M. Seaton noted that Randi "exposes the frauds that have been believed by gullible people from ancient times right up to the present".

In The Indianapolis Star, Rich Gotshall gave the book 2 1/2 stars out of 4, describing it as "interesting and fun", also depicting Randi's style as "straightforward, at times almost clinical". The book received a "B" grade in Entertainment Weekly, with David Hochman writing that it is "less a scholarly text than a diatribe against the dubious, from the abominable snowman to zombies", while also noting that "Randi never lets you forget that if something seems too weird to believe, it probably is". In the Enterprise-Record, Dan Barnett described the book as a "mishmash", stating that it "disappoints the reader who is looking for the kinds of exposes Randi is famous for". Barnett noted that the more interesting entries in the encyclopedia are "those that suggest ways in which psychics and others might be able to trick even to the soberest among us".

Of the UK edition, entitled The Supernatural A-Z: The Truth and the Lies, James Stannage wrote in the Manchester Evening News that the encyclopedia was "highly informative, thought-provoking and, best of all, entertaining". Chris Mellor also wrote in the Huddersfield Daily Examiner that Randi's entries are "occasionally dismissive but always thought-provoking and entertaining". The UK edition was also chosen as one of the 1995 "science books of the year" by the science staff at The Daily Telegraph.

== Editions and translations ==
- First edition (St. Martin's Press, 1995)
- Paperback edition (St. Martin's Press, 1997)
- UK edition: The Supernatural A-Z: The Truth and the Lies (Headline, 1995)
- German edition: Lexikon der übersinnlichen Phänomene: die Wahrheit über die paranormale Welt (Heyne, 2011)
- Online edition (James Randi Educational Foundation, 2006)
- Ebook (James Randi Educational Foundation, 2011)

In the online edition, Randi made several corrections, both factual and typographical. He also "dropped in a few jokes" that were not in the original publication. This edition does not include the original introduction or the foreword by Arthur C. Clarke.

== See also ==
- James Randi Educational Foundation
- Skeptic's Dictionary
