= Conjure =

Conjure may be:

- a verb with a range of common meanings; see its Wiktionary entry and Conjuration (disambiguation)
- a noun used regionally in the United States for Hoodoo
- the name of a 2000 poetry collection by Michael Donaghy

== See also ==
- Conjurer (disambiguation)
