= Banachek =

English mentalist and magician (born 1960)

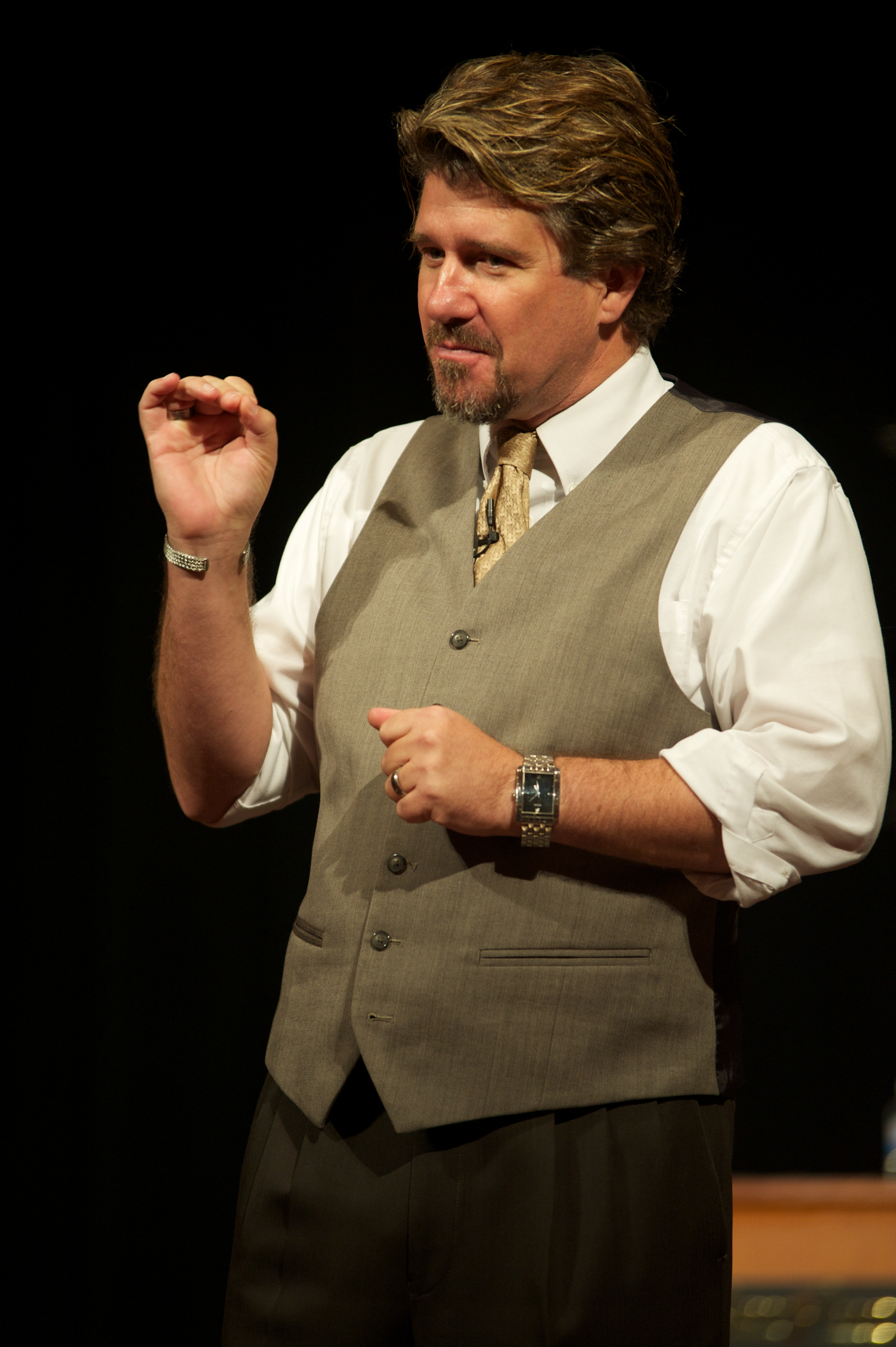
- Born: Steven Shaw; 30 November 1960 (age 65); Middlesex, England
- Occupations: Mentalist, magician, writer, debunker
- Website: banachek.com

Banachek (born Steven Shaw; 30 November 1960) (Note: Banachek legally changed his name from "Steven Shaw" to the mononym "Banachek".) is an English mentalist and magician.

He first came to public attention as a teenager for his role in James Randi's Project Alpha experiment, which exposed the lack of objectivity in parapsychology research. As director of the One Million Dollar Paranormal Challenge conducted by the James Randi Educational Foundation (JREF), he has since tested the authenticity of many self-described psychics, none of whom has managed to pass scientifically controlled tests of their claimed paranormal abilities.

Banachek is currently a fellow of the Committee for Skeptical Inquiry, a program of the Center for Inquiry, and the president of JREF.

== Early life ==
Banachek was born in England and raised in South Africa and Australia. He was abandoned at the age of nine in South Africa with his two brothers, aged one and three, and raised them by himself until he was 16.

Deciding that his given name did not sound memorable enough for a stage performer, Shaw adopted the stage name Banachek from the American detective television series Banacek. He was inspired to take up magic after reading The Truth About Uri Geller, a book by magician James Randi that debunked the paranormal claims of Uri Geller, famous for his feats of mentalism, particularly spoon bending. Having developed multiple methods for replicating Geller's tricks, Banachek wrote a letter to Randi in which he volunteered to demonstrate the gullibility of scientists studying parapsychology by deceiving them into believing that his mentalist tricks were genuine displays of psychic power.

== Project Alpha ==
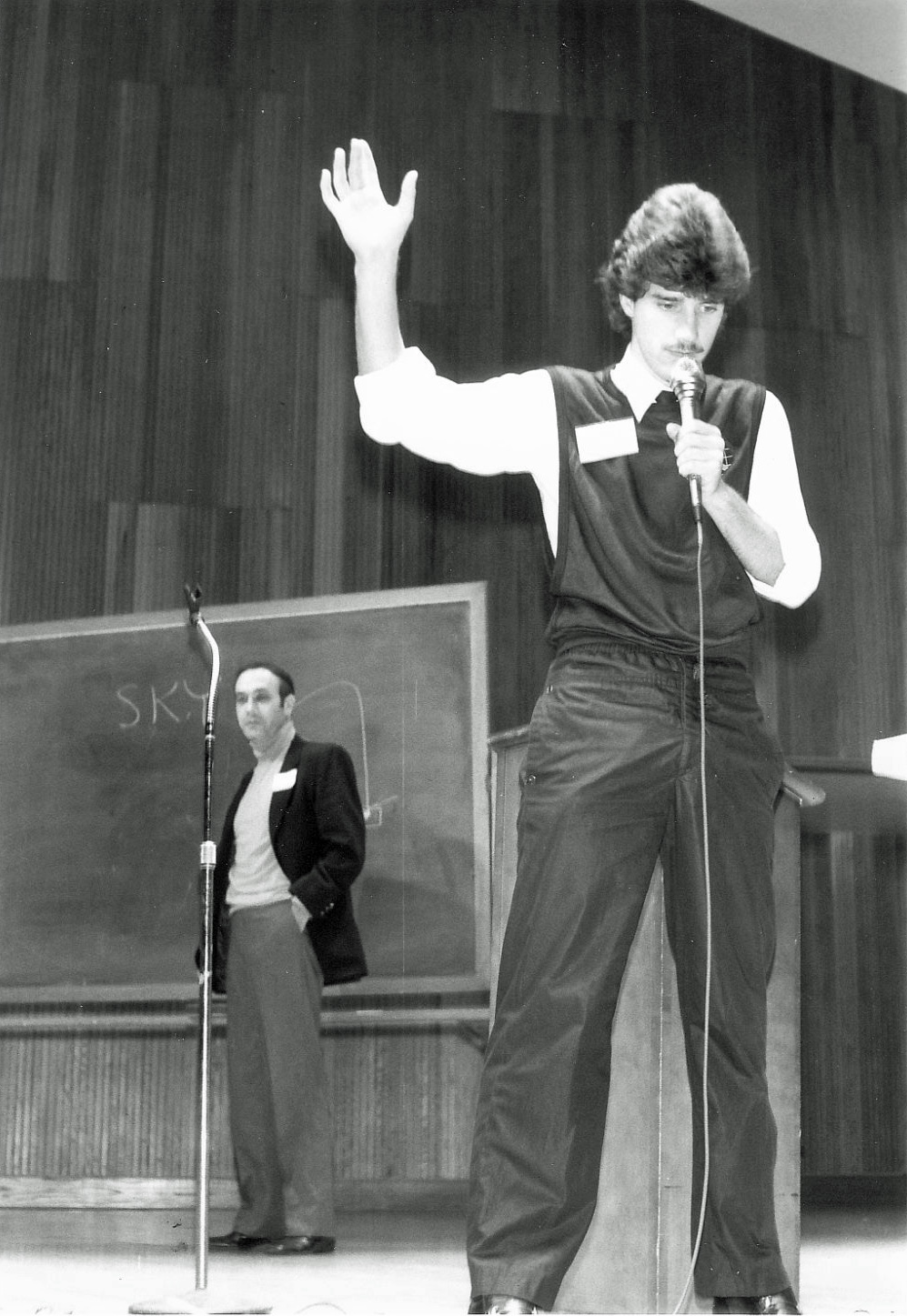
Banachek at the 1983 CSICOP Conference in Buffalo, New York

Banachek collaborated with fellow teenager Michael Edwards on James Randi's Project Alpha experiment at the newly founded McDonnell Laboratory for Psychical Research of Washington University in St. Louis. From 1979 to 1982, Banachek and Edwards replicated numerous mentalist effects, so thoroughly convincing researchers of the authenticity of their alleged paranormal abilities that some could not later be persuaded that they had in fact been deceived. The revelation that a pair of untrained teenagers had succeeded in hoodwinking a well-funded team of scientists exposed the lax methodology and lack of scientific control rife in the field of parapsychological research and led to permanent closure of the laboratory.

Banachek later assisted with Randi's investigation into the deceptive practices and false claims of self-proclaimed faith healer Peter Popoff.

== Professional accomplishments ==
On the television special The Search for Houdini (1987), hosted by William Shatner, Banachek performed an escape stunt in which he successfully dug his way out after being chained, handcuffed, locked in a coffin, and buried six feet underground.

In addition to touring internationally, Banachek serves as a consultant for numerous other entertainers and shows. Among the many tricks he has developed is a version of the bullet catch, a stage magic illusion in which a magician appears to catch a bullet fired directly at him. Although the bullet catch has earned a reputation for being the most dangerous magic trick, Banachek claims that his version is completely safe. Since purchasing the trick from him in 1995, Penn & Teller have developed several variations they use in their show at times. Since 2021, he has presented mentalism and magic in his show Mind Games, a multi-sensory, interactive experience at The Strat in Las Vegas, Nevada.

== Media appearances ==
Banachek has appeared as himself and produced several television programs and shows, including An Honest Liar, Criss Angel BeLIEve, and Criss Angel Mindfreak. He demonstrated his ability to bend forks on Unscrewed with Martin Sargent. He toured with the stage show Hoodwinked in 2008. During his appearance on The Alpha Project show (2012), he successfully predicted newspaper headlines ten days in advance of publication. He launched the Banachek: Telepathy tour in 2017.

== Debunking efforts ==
Banachek served as director of the JREF Million Dollar Challenge, overseeing numerous tests of supposed psychics, until it was suspended in 2015.

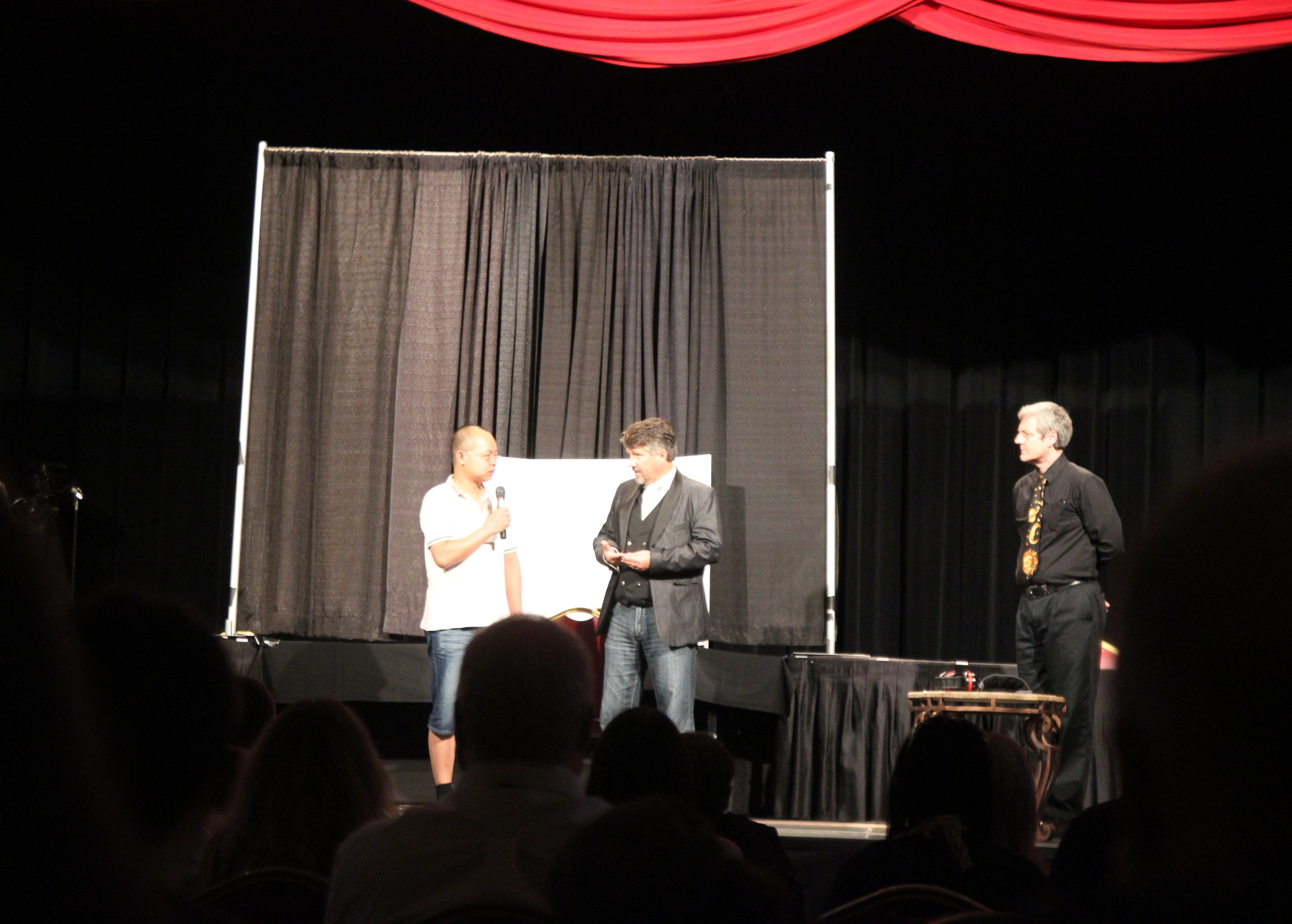
Million Dollar Challenge Test of Fei Wang, with Banachek and Richard Saunders running the challenge on 13 July 2014

When engaging in mentalism, Banachek provides the disclaimer that his show is "simply entertainment" and that he is not in fact a psychic, a practice that has aroused the ire of other mentalists. He reserves special disdain for mediums and faith healers who profit from people suffering from physical disability, disease, or the loss of loved ones. However, he urges caution when debunking psychics, encouraging skeptics not to "belittle the very people they are trying to convince" and to remain cognizant of the limitations of their own knowledge and expertise.

== Awards ==
- Awarded Mentalist of the Year by the International Magician Society in 2021
- Elected as a fellow of the Committee for Skeptical Inquiry, a program of the Center for Inquiry in 2017.
- Psychic Entertainers Association Dave Lederman Memorial Award (for Creativity in Mentalism), 1997.
- Psychic Entertainers Association Dan Blackwood Memorial Award (for Outstanding Contribution to the Art of Mentalism), 2006.
- Psychic Entertainers Association Dunninger Memorial Award (for Distinguished Professionalism in the Performance of Mentalism), 2007.
- Awarded Honorary Lifetime Membership at PSYCRETS (British Society of Mystery Entertainers) Tabula Mentis VII in April 2010.

== Books and videos ==
- Atmore, Joseph; Dunninger, Joseph; Banachek; Palmer, Bill (2001). Dunninger's Brain Busters. Humble, TX: H&R Magic Books. p. 111. OCLC 65215584.
- Banachek; Burlingame, Hardin J.; Wells, Scott R.; Gillett, S. Christopher (2002). Psychophysiological Thought Reading, or, Muscle Reading and the Ideomotor Response Revealed. Houston, Texas: Magic Inspirations. p. 73. ISBN 978-0-9706438-1-0. OCLC 60349209.
- Banachek; Dyment, Doug; Wells, Scott R. (2007). Psychological Subtleties 2. Houston, Texas: Magic Inspirations. p. 206. ISBN 978-0-9706438-2-7. OCLC 310366497.
- Banachek (Featured Performer) (2004). Banachek's Psi Series (Motion picture). United States: L&L Publishing.
- Banachek (Featured Performer) (2016). Houdini & Doyle's World of Wonders (Motion picture). Canada: GlobalTV.com.
