= An Honest Liar =

- Theatrical release poster
- Directed by: Justin Weinstein; Tyler Measom
- Written by: Justin Weinstein; Tyler Measom; Greg O'Toole
- Produced by: Tyler Measom; Justin Weinstein
- Cinematography: Tyler Measom; Justin Weinstein
- Edited by: Greg O'Toole
- Music by: Joel Goodman
- Production companies: Left Turn Films; Pure Mutt Productions; Part2 Filmworks
- Distributed by: Abramorama
- Release dates: April 18, 2014 (Tribeca Film Festival); March 6, 2015
- Running time: 93 minutes
- Country: United States
- Language: English
- Budget: Undisclosed

An Honest Liar is a 2014 biographical feature film documentary, directed and produced by Justin Weinstein and Tyler Measom, written by Weinstein, Greg O'Toole and Measom, produced through Left Turn Films, Pure Mutt Productions and Part2 Filmworks, and distributed by Abramorama. The film documents the life of former magician, escape artist, and skeptical educator James Randi, in particular the investigations through which he publicly exposed psychics, faith healers, and con-artists. The film also focuses on Randi's relationship with his partner of 25 years, José Alvarez, who at the time of filming, had been discovered to be living under a false identity, calling into question "whether Randi was the deceiver or the deceived."

The film was screened at a number of 2014 film festivals, including the Tribeca Film Festival, Hot Docs, and AFI Docs Festival, where it won the Audience Award for Best Feature. It was released in February 2015.

== Cast ==
- James Randi – A retired stage magician and escape artist, turned scientific skeptic investigator known for his public exposés of faith healers, psychics, and other promoters of pseudoscientific and paranormal claims. The film focuses on his life as an investigator, and his relationship with his long-time boyfriend and later husband, José Alvarez.
- Alice Cooper – A rock singer/songwriter who hired magician James Randi to design and coordinate the effects for his 1973 Billion Dollar Babies tour. Randi also appeared in the stage show as The Executioner, and would end each show by decapitating Cooper.
- Bill Nye – Science educator and host of the Disney/PBS children's science show Bill Nye the Science Guy
- Adam Savage – Industrial design and special effects designer/fabricator, and one of the co-hosts of the Discovery Channel television series MythBusters and Unchained Reaction
- Penn & Teller – American illusionists and entertainers
- Michael Shermer – Science writer, historian of science, founder of The Skeptics Society, and Editor in Chief of its magazine Skeptic
- Deyvi Peña (a.k.a. José Alvarez) – Performance artist who posed as a channeller known as "Carlos" on Australian television, in a hoax arranged by Randi. He was also Randi's live-in boyfriend of 25 years, and the two were married in 2013. Following legal action involving allegations of identity theft, "José Alvarez's" real name was revealed to be Deyvi Peña.
- Richard Wiseman – Professor of the Public Understanding of Psychology at the University of Hertfordshire
- Jamy Ian Swiss – Close-up magician who works primarily with cards
- Ray Hyman – Professor Emeritus of Psychology at the University of Oregon in Eugene, Oregon, and a noted critic of parapsychology
- Steve Shaw – Mentalist known by the stage name Banachek, who posed as a psychic in a paranormal research project at Washington University in St. Louis
- Michael Edwards – Actor who posed as a psychic in a paranormal research project at Washington University in St. Louis
- Uri Geller – Israeli illusionist, television personality, and self-proclaimed psychic, known for his trademark television performances of spoon bending and other supposed psychic effects. Geller famously failed to perform his feats under controlled conditions during a 1973 appearance on The Tonight Show with Johnny Carson, after Randi supervised the staff of that program on the proper handling of the materials used in the performance to prevent cheating.

== Synopsis ==
An Honest Liar documents James Randi's early life as a carnival-bound refugee from Toronto who, early on, dedicated himself to learning every trick performed by Harry Houdini, and even improving on some of them. In one of his feats as an escape artist, Randi frees himself from a straitjacket while being hung upside down by his ankles over Niagara Falls.

Age and concerns over the danger of his profession and his health leads him to retire from that occupation and seek out not only a new career, but a crusading obsession that makes him a pop cultural fixture by the 1970s: As a scientific skeptic investigator and challenger to pseudoscientific and paranormal claims, which leads him to expose the deceit behind religious faith healers, psychics, and other con artists who exploit the public. Randi becomes a recurring guest on The Tonight Show with Johnny Carson, and makes appearances on TV shows such as Happy Days and in rock music artist Alice Cooper's 1973 Billion Dollar Babies tour, where Randi, portraying the Executioner, decapitates Cooper at the end of each performance.

The film spotlights some of the more notable targets investigated and debunked by Randi. One is mentalist Uri Geller, who performed psychic feats on the talk show circuit, such as bending a spoon with minimal contact, and guessing the contents of sealed envelopes and other objects. Randi worked closely with the staff of The Tonight Show with Johnny Carson prior to a 1973 appearance on that program by Geller, who publicly claimed at the time that his acts were performed with genuine psychic ability, and not magic tricks. Randi had The Tonight Show staff observe strict controls over the materials that Geller would work with during his appearance to prevent any trickery or cheating. As a result, Geller was unable to perform any of the feats that he regularly performed on other TV shows. Another target is faith healer Peter Popoff, who during his church revival meetings, demonstrated personal knowledge of people in the audience, such as their names, addresses and illnesses, which he stated was due to the work of God. Randi discovered that the true source of this information was a radio in Popoff's ear with which he was fed information by his wife. Another venture on which Randi embarked had him perpetrating a hoax on the Australian public in which a young man claimed on Australian television to channel the spirit of an ancient seer. The man was in reality Randi's partner, performance artist José Alvarez. In another, Randi had two confederates, mentalist Steve Shaw and actor Michael Edwards, pose as mentalists in a Washington University in St. Louis study that mistakenly confirmed Geller as an actual psychic.

The film also details Randi's longtime relationship with Alvarez, his decision to publicly come out at age 81, and how Alvarez, at the time of filming, had recently been discovered to be living under a false identity, which leads to legal ramifications for the couple.

== Production ==
In 2012 producers Tyler Measom and Justin Weinstein visited James Randi at his home in Plantation, Florida to express interest in filming a documentary about his life. To illustrate their bona fides to him, they gave him copies of their previous documentaries. Randi comments, "When I saw the product that they had turned out, I thought to myself, 'These are the guys. These are the guys that I think I can trust with my life story.'"

The film was funded in part via a campaign Kickstarter, which successfully concluded on February 15, 2013, obtaining $246,989 USD from 3,096 backers, $98,989 more than its goal of $148,000. The film is produced through Left Turn Films, Pure Mutt Productions, and Part2 Filmworks by Tyler Measom and Justin Weinstein, who also directed, and written by Weinstein, Measom and Greg O'Toole. Toole also edited the film. The film's music is produced by Joel Goodman. It is distributed by Abramorama.

== Reception and release ==
=== Release ===
An Honest Liar was screened at the April 2014 Tribeca Film Festival. It was then screened May 1 and 3, 2014 at Toronto's Hot Docs film festival. It was also screened at the June 2014 AFI Docs Festival in Silver Spring, Maryland and Washington, D.C., where it won the Audience Award for Best Feature. Its wide releases was March 6, 2015.

On November 2, 2014 BBC Four aired the film as an episode of the documentary series Storyville, under the name: Exposed: Magicians, Psychics and Frauds.

=== Critical reception ===
The film holds a 98% score on the review aggregator website Rotten Tomatoes, based on 34 reviews with Critics Consensus "A thoughtful and surprisingly layered documentary enlivened by its subject, An Honest Liar serves as a well-deserved tribute to a fascinating life." Geoff Pevere, reviewing the film for The Globe and Mail, gave the film three out of four stars, calling it "aptly seductive", though he called into question whether the methods Randi used in the case of the Australian hoax were a form of dubious deceit themselves, stating, "The ultimate question in An Honest Liar is whether it's possible to know so much about the method behind the magic without being fooled into believing your own act."

David Rooney, reviewing the film for The Hollywood Reporter, thought the film "intriguing", but felt the transition from Randi's investigations to the revelations about Alvarez were too abrupt, and the conclusions lacking full coherence, and summarized the film as "a compelling magic act that loses focus in the big finish when the cloak gets whisked away."

The film was a Critics' Pick of The New York Times, for which reviewer Jeannette Catsoulis called the film a "jaunty, jovial portrait with a surprising sting in its tail". Catsoulis also called the development of Randi and Alvarez's legal problems to be "moving".

Richard Roeper of the Chicago Sun-Times gave the film a grade of "B", praising Weinstein and Measom's directorial style. Though Roeper thought that the film lost some momentum when exploring the minutiae of the Washington University hoax, and found the shift in focus of the last third of the film to the matter of José Alvarez's identity jarring, Roeper stated that Randi deserves a standing ovation for his work, and called the film "an honest portrait" of him.

== Awards ==
- Audience Award for Best Feature, 2014 AFI Docs Festival
