= Conjuration =

Conjuration or Conjuring may refer to:

== Concepts ==
- Conjuration (summoning), the evocation of spirits or other supernatural entities
  - Conjuration, a school of magic in Dungeons & Dragons
- Conjuration (illusion), the performance of stage magic
- Incantation, or a magic spell
- The swearing of an oath, or a conspiracy (archaic use)

== Films ==
- Conjuring (1896 film), an 1896 French short silent film
- The Conjuring Universe, an American supernatural horror film franchise
  - The Conjuring, the 2013 first film in the series

== Other uses ==
- Conjuration (EP), a 2003 EP by Behemoth
- Conjuration: Fat Tuesday's Session, a 1983 album by Pepper Adams
- Conjuring (book), a 1992 book by James Randi
- "The Conjuring" (song), a 1986 song by Megadeth

== See also ==
- Conjurer (disambiguation)
- Conjugation (disambiguation)
