= Flim-Flam! =

1980 book by James Randi

Flim-Flam! Psychics, ESP, Unicorns, and Other Delusions
- First (1980) edition
- Author: James Randi
- Subject: Parapsychology and Occultism
- Published: 1980 by Thomas Y. Crowell then Lippincott Crowell (Hardback, limited printing); 1982 by Prometheus Books (Revised with introduction by Isaac Asimov in paperback)
- Publication place: United States
- Pages: 340 pages (hardback); 357 (paperback)
- ISBN: 9780690018776 (hardback); ISBN 9780879751982 (paperback)
- Dewey Decimal: 133.8 19
- LC Class: BF1042 .R24 1982

Flim-Flam! Psychics, ESP, Unicorns, and Other Delusions is a 1980 book by magician and skeptic James Randi about paranormal, occult, and pseudoscience claims. The foreword is by science fiction author Isaac Asimov. Randi explores topics which he says that scientists and the media are too willing to promote without skepticism and proper expertise.

== Content ==
Timothy Ferris wrote that Flim Flam! "will enlighten any reader who does not clearly understand that not one shard of evidence exists to prove that the Bermuda Triangle poses any special menace to ships and planes, that earth is being visited by alien spacecraft, that the unassisted power of the mind can read closed books, predict our future or induce levitation, or that the 'psychic surgeons' of the Philippines have relieved their patients of any burden more troublesome than their money." Randi levels criticism at the sloppy study designs and faulty controls of the investigations into remote viewing by Russell Targ and Harold Puthoff.

George Kauffman wrote, "Randi explores and exposes the outrageous deceptions widely promoted in the sensation-seeking media." The book calls on "researchers" to be accountable for their failures and impostures. Randi writes the public is badly served by scientists investigating the paranormal who don't adhere to the standards of their profession and shows how sloppy research was followed with rationalization of their failures. The book repeatedly explores the sloppy nature of research into the paranormal, pointing out how commonly carelessness and selective interpretation that would not be tolerated in other fields of research is accepted in investigations of the supernatural. Randi documents how the scientific method is often twisted and bent to accommodate the subject of investigation.

One anecdote in the book is Randi's experience as a newspaper astrologer in Montreal under the name Zo-ran where he cut horoscopes from old astrology magazines and randomly assigned them to the twelve signs of the zodiac, publishing the results. Randi also debunks the book Chariots of the Gods? noting, among other things, the author's eurocentrism. The Transcendental Meditation movement and Edgar Cayce's mystic medical practice are subjected to Randi's skeptical scrutiny. The author also deconstructs the Cottingley Fairies, particularly addressing how Arthur Conan Doyle fell for the hoax. The complete absence of any physical evidence of UFOs is also discussed.

Later sections of the book cover specific cases of paranormal feats where Randi was consulted as an expert or judge. These include tests of dowsing and pyramid power. In these anecdotes the reader learns some of the methods used by charlatans including how to guess cards, tilt tables, read while blindfolded and produce photographs. Randi announces an annual award for "the psychic who fools the greatest number of people with the least effort" and the scientists, journalists and foundations they fool. The "Uri trophy" is a bent spoon on a "flimsy and quite transparent base". He writes that winners will be notified telepathically.

== Reception ==
Timothy Ferris wrote in The New York Times Book Review it is "a healthy and often hilarious book." He described the "Uri trophy" as typical of the "cheerful devices" of Randi's book. Ferris cited Randi's "penchant for sarcasm and overemphasis" as a drawback and considered this "heavy-handedness" appropriate for charlatans who profit from fraud but less so for sincere if gullible true-believers. He noted Randi apologized for this, describing it as, "killing the gnat with a sledgehammer."

Kirkus Reviews states Flim Flam! has a brisk pace and clear message. They were also critical of Randi's "abrasive style" but state that after, "Randi has set forth the shameless frauds and money-making schemes, the outrageous misstatements and falsifications of data in respected scientific journals, the righteous harangue seems warranted." The magazine describes the anecdotes about cases Randi was involved in as a judge or expert as absorbing and states they go far to make the point, "if you design the experiment adequately, no extraordinary powers are demonstrated." concluding, "By the end of the book, Randi's personal offer of $10,000 to be paid to anyone who successfully demonstrates paranormal abilities under proper test conditions seems safe beyond a doubt."

Dave Langford reviewed Flim-Flam! for White Dwarf #43, and stated that "Always he thrusts before your nose the parts of the story which believers' books omit: even if inclined towards the loony, I mean the uncritical viewpoint, you should consult these books for the devil's advocate arguments. They are important. In a world where an ounce of sensationalism sells better than a ton of rationality any day, they are very important."

Jack Kirwan writing in the National Review embraced the tone of the book describing the writing as "a juicy knock-'em-down style" and stating, "Randi takes on the heavies of the paranormal scene - von Däniken, UFOs, Uri Geller, TM - and feeds them into the meat grinder of critical investigation." The San Francisco Chronicle stated, "Flim-Flam! is an excellent overview of paranormal claims that analyzes medical humbugs, psychic photography, Transcendental Meditation, ancient astronauts, UFOs, etc. Plentiful photographs catch hoaxers in the act."

In a review of the audiotape edition in the Journal of College Science Teaching George Kauffman wrote of Randi's analysis of the failures of paranormal "researchers", "In clearly pointing out their errors and misrepresentations, he provides a compelling and convincing case that will startle and enlighten the listener, especially one unable to distinguish between genuine scientific research and the pseudoscientific nonsense that results in fantastic theories and fallacies. The Lodi News-Sentinel stated Flim Flam! succeeds in discrediting the supernatural.

In 2001 Skeptic magazine listed Flim Flam! at number three in its "Top Ten Recommended Skeptics' Books". Novelist Christopher Brookmyre listed Flim Flam! among four of the best, "works evincing a vivid, clear and entertaining rationalism." In a 2010 interview the magician Teller listed it as one of four books "In My Library." As of 2014 Flim-Flam! Psychics, ESP, Unicorns, and Other Delusions has been cited in newspapers, magazines and scientific journals, since its initial publication in 1980 to 2014 Google Scholar lists 82 citations and 3 citations in 2023

During an interview at TAM! 2012, Penn Jillette stated that he read Flim-Flam! in high school and "Randi had already started changing [his] life."

== Publication history ==
Flim Flam! was originally published in hardcover by Thomas Y. Crowell Co. then by Lippincott Crowell (an imprint of Harper & Row). The publication run by Harper & Row was planned to be 17,500 but was reduced to about 6,000 and the book was declared out of print by the publisher despite outstanding paid orders. Randi charged this was due to the publisher's conflict of interest, as Randi described the market for books promoting belief in the supernatural as, "possibly the single greatest moneymaker in publishing today." Harper & Row denied this. A revised edition with an introduction by Isaac Asimov was published in 1982 by Prometheus Books. As of 2001 the book is available in English, Norwegian, Polish, Spanish, Italian, and Chinese.

== Editions ==
- iPad / iPhone edition, 2011
- Norwegian edition 1994 (Juks og Bedrag!)
- Spanish edition by Tikal, Madrid, 1994 (Fraudes paranormales)
- Polish edition 1994
- Cassette tape (extracts) edition 1995 by Prometheus
- Italian edition 1999 (Fandonie)
- Chinese edition, 2001
- Punjabi edition, 2003

== See also ==
- Committee for Skeptical Inquiry
- Confidence trick (Flim flam)
- James Randi Educational Foundation
