= Conjurer =

Conjurer may refer to:

- A performer of evocation, the act of summoning a spirit or other supernatural agent
- A performer of stage magic
- Conjurer (band), a British metal band
- Conjurer (composition), a 2007 composition by John Corigliano
- Conjurer (film), a 2008 American supernatural horror film
- The Conjurer (painting), a 1502 painting by Hieronymus Bosch
- The Conjuror (Hone), a 1775 painting by Nathaniel Hone the Elder

== See also ==
- Conjure (disambiguation)
- Conjuration (disambiguation)
