= Secrets of the Psychics =

- NOVA episode
- Episode no.: Season 21; Episode 3
- Written by: Carl Charlson
- Presented by: James Randi
- Original air date: October 19, 1993
- Running time: 60 minutes

Episode chronology
← Previous "Wanted: Butch and Sundance"	Next → "Dying to Breathe"

"Secrets of the Psychics" is a 1993 episode of the PBS series NOVA, presented by retired illusionist and paranormal investigator James Randi. Also appearing in stock footage are Peter Popoff, Uri Geller, and many others. It contains historical footage of Randi's 25 years of testing claims of supernatural powers, as well as more current footage of his trip to Russia to investigate the people making paranormal claims there. Belief in the paranormal has thrived in Russia since the dissolution of the USSR.

PBS' "NOVA Teachers" program produced a "Teachers Guide" to support the show. In the program, "Randi argues that successful psychics depend on the willingness of their audiences to believe that what they see is the result of psychic powers."

== Synopsis ==
At the beginning of the episode, Randi states that "Magical thinking...is a slippery slope. Sometimes it’s harmless enough, but at other times it’s quite dangerous. Personally I’m opposed to that kind of fakery, so I have no reservations at all about exposing these people and their illusions for what they really are." The documentary then covers several of Randi’s previous investigations into claims of the paranormal, using stock footage of Uri Geller, Peter Popoff, and others, and also includes new footage covering a variety of other topics. The documentary is divided into segments covering the following topics:

- The conjuring tricks of Uri Geller
- Peter Popoff and faith healing
- Psychic surgery
- Astrology and Barnum statements
- Palm reading
- Confirmation bias
- The popularity of psychics and alternative medicine in Russia after the dissolution of the Soviet Union

== Reception ==
Writing for the New York Times, Walter Goodman noted that Randi makes "people who claim to be able to bend spoons, cure cancer and perform other marvels by the power of mind alone look silly", noting in particular that the segments exposing Uri Geller were amusing. However, he also described the episode as "patchy", and wrote that Randi was "tormenting purported scientists and healers" in the segment on Russia.

The Los Angeles Times described it as "a worldwide investigation into psychic phenomena", and conducted an interview with Randi which focused particularly on the Russian segments. The Brain Institute in Moscow was singled out, still working on ideas that had been "bombed out of existence" 25 years before because the researchers would not acknowledge that they are subject to the same cognitive distortions as anybody else. So they did not use, and did not see the need for, basic techniques like blinding, placebos, and control tests.

The South Florida Sun-Sentinel described Randi as "a superb magician, writer, lecturer ... who has devoted the past 25 years to investigating and debunking psychics, quacks and various supernatural frauds". They made the point that it's not just uneducated people who get fooled; people with sophisticated laboratories get fooled. "Scientists", Randi observed, "have an uncanny ability to find what they're looking for - whether it's there or not."

The video has been covered in university courses on critical thinking. Southern Methodist University's Department of Physics analyzed it as part of their course KNW 2333 "The Scientific Method - Critical and Creative Thinking (Debunking Pseudoscience)", examining how Randi's methods compared to their own. Rensselaer Polytechnic Institute showed and analyzed the video as part of their Critical Thinking course, although they put more emphasis on the mental factors that make people susceptible to such tricks. They take exception to what they perceive as the "believer vs skeptic" viewpoint in the video, and suggest that it would be best if we all acknowledge that we move along that scale all the time.

Bill Dembski's forthcoming (as of March 2022) book The Faces of Miracles (co-authored with Alex Thomas) has a chapter about James Randi, which starts by describing his approach that strives to start with an open mind about the claims being tested: tests are designed to determine whether the claim is true or false. It then gives a summary of Randi's career as an illusionist, concluding that some people want to be fooled so badly that even when he explains that it was an illusion, they don't believe him. This is followed by an overview of Randi's debunking activities, culminating with the Russian tour for Secrets of the Psychics which showcased all of the elements he had built up over the years. Dembski concluded that when researchers look for a specific result, they tend to find it; this is known technically as "confirmation bias".

== VHS release ==
- "Secrets of the Psychics". 1996. ISBN 1-57807-040-6
