= Conjuring (book) =

Illustrated book by James Randi

- Author: James Randi
- Publisher: St. Martin's Press
- Publication date: 1992
- Publication place: United States of America
- Media type: Hardcover
- Pages: 314
- ISBN: 0-312-08634-2
- OCLC: 26162991
- Dewey Decimal: 793.8

Conjuring (Note: Full title Conjuring, being a definitive account of the venerable arts of sorcery, prestidigitation, wizardry, deception, & chicanery, and of the mountebanks and scoundrels who have perpetrated these subterfuges on a bewildered public) is an illustrated book about conjuring, or magic, by James "The Amazing" Randi, who himself was a magician and escape artist. Drawing on his extensive knowledge and experience in the field, Randi offers a series of brief biographies of a variety of noteworthy magicians and their unique styles, including Harry Houdini, Chung Ling Soo, Harry Blackstone Sr., Harry Blackstone Jr., Howard Thurston, and many others. He also provides an overview of several genres of magic such as stage magic, escapology, and mentalism, and of specific tricks such as the bullet catch. Reviews of the book were mainly positive.

== Background ==
James Randi was a Canadian-American magician, escape artist, author, and scientific skeptic. Randi had a varied career, performing stage magic, mentalism, escape acts, spending almost an hour encased in a slab of ice; and "decapitating" Alice Cooper with a trick guillotine every night on tour. After seriously injuring himself in an escape act, Randi quit escapism and stage magic. He later published several books, including a biography of the magician Harry Houdini, followed by several books in which he challenged claims of the paranormal. In writing Conjuring, Randi returned to the world of magic and illusion.

Conjuring is an account of the art of magic, including its origins, history, and major performers. The book consists primarily of brief biographies of noteworthy magicians, with some chapters centred on specific techniques such as mentalism or escapology, or specific tricks such as the bullet catch. In selecting performers to write about, Randi chose "major figures who [he] felt best represented various aspects of the trade", also noting that he "tried to create a history of the subject rather than a catalog of performers". Randi also made the choice to avoid the "tiresome custom" of revealing secrets behind the illusions described throughout the book, believing that "the personalities, the events, and the growth of this art should provide entertainment enough to the reader". Throughout the book, there are also many illustrations, photographs, and documents, many in colour.

== Contents ==
In chapters 1-5, Randi provides brief overviews of the Egyptian origins of magic; cups and balls; rabbits out of hats; and the apocryphal nature of the Indian rope trick. He then offers an outline of conjuring in early Europe and presents biographies of early magicians including Joseph Pinetti, Philadelphia, Philippe (Jacques André Noé Talon), and John Henry Anderson. Randi also presents a history of automata, which were used by early conjurors. Chapter 6 focuses on Jean-Eugène Robert-Houdin and aerial suspension. Chapter 7 covers the Davenport brothers and spiritualism, which was used as an explanation for the brothers’ tricks. Chapters 8-10 are about Georges Méliès, John Nevil Maskelyne, and Compars and Alexander Herrmann.

In chapter 11, Randi describes the bullet catch trick and its deadly history, while in chapter 12 he focuses on Chung Ling Soo, who famously died after attempting a bullet catch. Chapters 13-15 focus on The Great Lafayette; several performers who used the name "Bosco", such as Bartolomeo Bosco; Johann Nepomuk Hofzinser; Josef Levin (who also performed as "Hofzinser"); Robert Heller; Horace Goldin and the sawing a woman in half trick; and the trio Le Roy, Talma, and Bosco.

Chapters 16-20 feature Harry Kellar, Kellar's successor Howard Thurston, Dante the Great, Harry Jansen, the Bamberg family, Harry Blackstone Sr., Harry Blackstone Jr., P. C. Sorcar, P. C. Sorcar Jr., and Gogia Pasha. Randi also provides a personal account of his awe of Blackstone Sr. In Chapter 21, Randi offers an account of the life and work of the escape artist Harry Houdini, which is written in more detail than the mini-biographies in the rest of the book. Chapters 22 and 23 cover four generations of "Richiardi"s, the comic strip hero "Mandrake the Magician", and Leon Mandrake.

The mini biographies in chapters 24-28 are grouped according to genre of magic. Chapter 24 focuses on escape artists including Dean Gunnarson, Bernardi Eskilsen, Hilden Neureiter, and Laurice. Randi also provides an account of the time he nearly died while trying to escape from a safe. Chapter 25 is about the "manipulators" Cardini and Channing Pollock. In Chapter 26, Randi discusses a variety of mentalists, some of whom include Washington Irving Bishop, Max Maven, Joseph Dunninger, Uri Geller, and Steve Shaw. Chapter 27 is about the pickpockets Dominique Risbourg, Dr. Giovanni, and Borra. Chapter 28 is about the children’s entertainers Johnny Giordemaine and Alo Bongo, and street workers.

In chapter 29, Randi offers a historical perspective on magic in China, Japan, and India. Chapter 30 covers approximately two dozen "modern wizards", some of whom include Robert Harbin, Penn & Teller, Jeff McBride, Lance Burton, and David Copperfield.

== Reception ==
Conjuring received mostly positive reviews. Kirkus Reviews wrote that the book was "lively, opinionated, and impeccably well informed", praising it for "shedding new light on even the most famous", and also calling it "[a] must for magic-lovers". The review did note, however, that the book could have been improved by including "explanation[s] of how the hundreds of stunts and tricks described were performed". In the Detroit Free Press, Judy Rose wrote that Randi's "bizarre history of magic makes very good reading". In the South Florida Sun Sentinel, Bill Kelley praised Randi's "meticulous, encyclopedic assessment of his forebears and colleagues", also praising the "superbly reproduced illustrations" that complement the text. Kelley also praised the book for "finally" providing a magician's view of other magicians. John Meacham wrote in the Times Colonist that the book was "extremely well researched" and was "invaluable to the devoted magician and very good reading for the person who just wants to get the background of the who, when, but not how of magic". However, Meacham made the "slight criticism" that Randi "does take it for granted that a lay person understands all the lingo or the modus operandi of the profession". In The Kingston Whig-Standard, Justin Busch described the book as an "amiable, chatty historical survey", also praising the book for being "lavishly illustrated". The Anniston Star recommended the book, calling it a "fascinating history" with "nostalgia, amazement, revelation and mystery".

In a negative review, Publishers Weekly described the book as "broad but ultimately unsatisfying", also writing that it "becomes tedious as it degenerates into a collection of brief profiles of relatively obscure performers". The review also criticised Randi for not revealing the secrets behind the illusions described in the book.
