= Arthur Lintgen =

American physician (born 1942)

Arthur Benner Lintgen (born 1942) is an American physician from Philadelphia who can recognize classical phonograph records with the naked eye. This ability was verified by James Randi in 1982, although Lintgen claims no extrasensory powers, merely knowledge of the way that the groove forms patterns on particular recordings.

Lintgen attended the University of Pennsylvania and Jefferson Medical College. He first attempted to identify a record with its label covered after a colleague challenged him to try it at a party. When Lintgen sees a vinyl record, he can recognize the music in a couple of seconds. Based on the physical construction and the grooves and contours on the record, he can recognize sections where music is loud or quiet, the length of each movement and so on. Then he uses his extensive knowledge of European classical music to recognize the music. He can also draw extra information about the structure of the vinyl; for example, because records from different companies are slightly different, he can sometimes guess the conductor.

However, his ability is strictly limited to classical orchestral music by and after Beethoven. He says instrumental and chamber music creates unrecognizable patterns, and that pre-Beethoven orchestral pieces are usually too alike in structure to identify. When given an Alice Cooper recording as a control, he said it looked "disorganized" and "[like] gibberish". Beethoven's Fifth Symphony is the most common record he is asked to identify; on one occasion he correctly guessed the record without even glancing at it.
