= Prometheus Books =

American publishing company

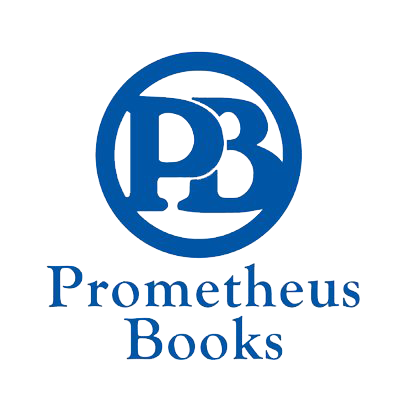
- Parent company: The Globe Pequot Publishing Group
- Status: Active
- Founded: 1969; 57 years ago
- Founder: Paul Kurtz
- Country of origin: United States
- Headquarters location: Amherst, New York
- Key people: Jonathan Kurtz, President
- Nonfiction topics: Skeptical literature, atheism
- Imprints: Humanity Books (for academic works in the humanities)
- Official website: www.globepequot.com/imprint/prometheus-books/

Prometheus Books is a publishing company founded in August 1969 by the philosopher Paul Kurtz (who was also the founder of the Council for Secular Humanism, Center for Inquiry, and co-founder of the Committee for Skeptical Inquiry). The publisher's name was derived from Prometheus, the Titan from Greek mythology who stole fire from Zeus and gave it to man. This act is often used as a metaphor for bringing knowledge or enlightenment.

Prometheus Books publishes a range of books, focusing on topics such as science, freethought, secularism, humanism, and skepticism. It has published in the "atheism" category since its founding in 1969, and is considered the "grandfather" of atheist publishing in America.

Their headquarters is located in Amherst, New York, and they publish worldwide. Jonathan Kurtz was an executive editor of Prometheus. Rowman & Littlefield acquired Prometheus Books in 2019. Rowman & Littlefield changed its name to The Globe Pequot Publishing Group after the sale of its academic publishing business to Bloomsbury Publishing in 2024, keeping Prometheus Books as one of its imprints.

The publisher has roughly 1,700 books currently in print, and publishes approximately 95–100 books per year. Since its founding, Prometheus Books has published more than 2,500 books.

== Imprints ==
Prometheus Books obtained the bulk of the books and manuscripts of Humanities Press International in 1998. It has been building and expanding this into a scholarly imprint named Humanity Books. This imprint publishes academic works across a wide spectrum of the humanities and is now distributed by the academic division of Rowman & Littlefield.

In March 2005, Prometheus Books launched the science fiction and fantasy imprint Pyr. In October 2012 it launched the crime fiction imprint Seventh Street Books. In 2018, it sold both imprints.

== Lawsuits ==
Prometheus has been involved in two "major libel lawsuits." In 1992 Uri Geller sued Victor J. Stenger and Prometheus Books for libel over his book Physics and Psychics. The suit was dismissed and Geller was required to pay more than $20,000 in costs to the defendant. Geller also sued Prometheus for publishing The Truth About Uri Geller by James Randi, a book that he said was defamatory.

== Book series ==
- Contemporary Issues in Philosophy Series
- Great Books in Philosophy
- Great Minds Series

== Partnerships and sale ==
In 2013 Prometheus Books partnered with Random House in an effort to increase sales and distribution.

In 2019, it was acquired by Rowman & Littlefield, and Random House ceased sales and distribution of its titles as of June 30, 2019. Its building was sold in early 2019 for over $1 million.
