= James Randi =

Canadian-American magician and skeptic (1928–2020)

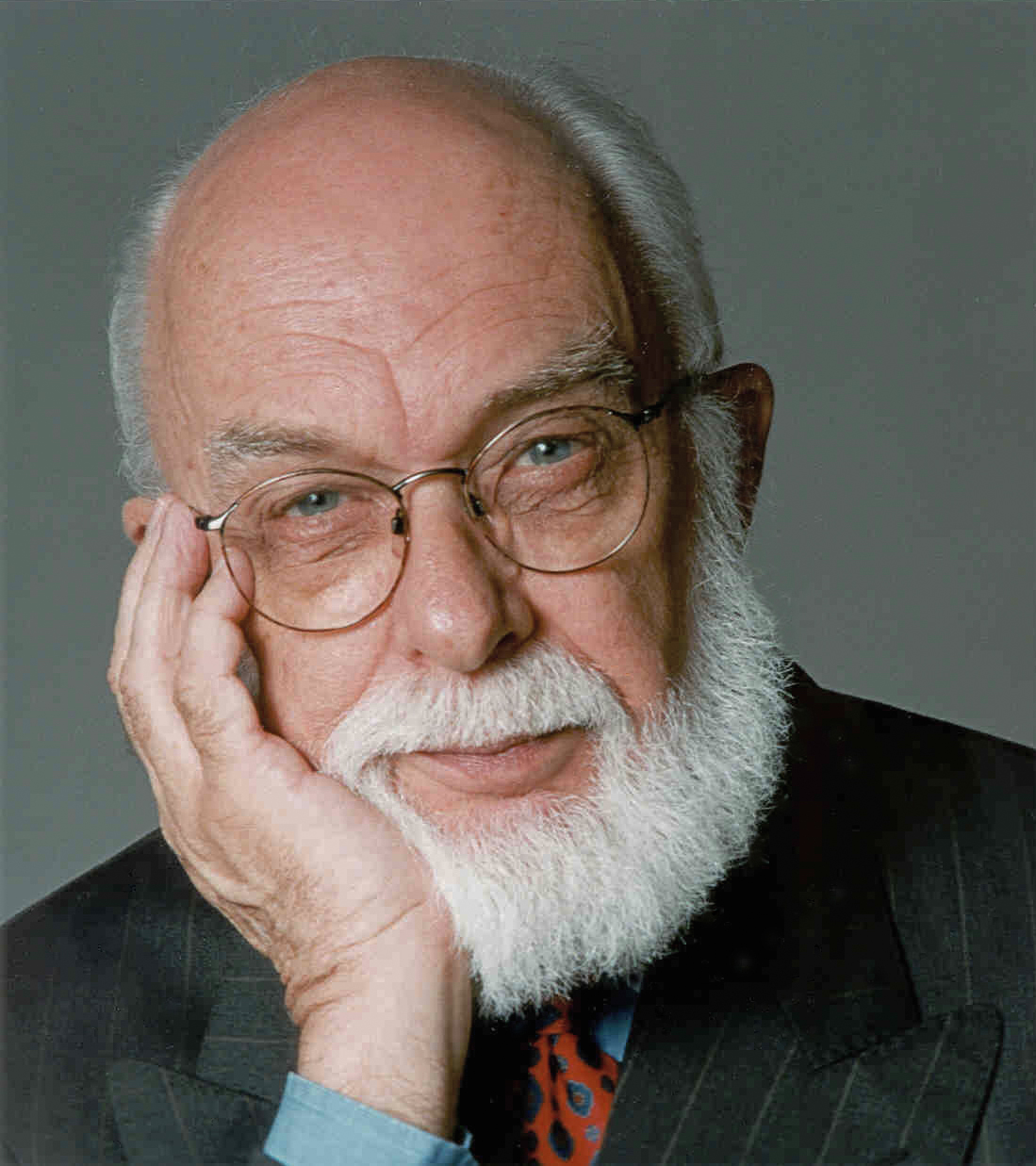
- Randi c. 1990s
- Born: Randall James Hamilton Zwinge; August 7, 1928; Toronto, Ontario, Canada
- Died: October 20, 2020 (aged 92); Plantation, Florida, U.S.
- Other name: The Amazing Randi
- Citizenship: Canada; United States
- Occupations: Stage magician; scientific skeptic; author
- Years active: 1946−2016
- Spouse: José Alvarez (m. 2013)
- James Randi's voice Recorded October 2016 at CSICon
- Website: web.randi.org

Signature
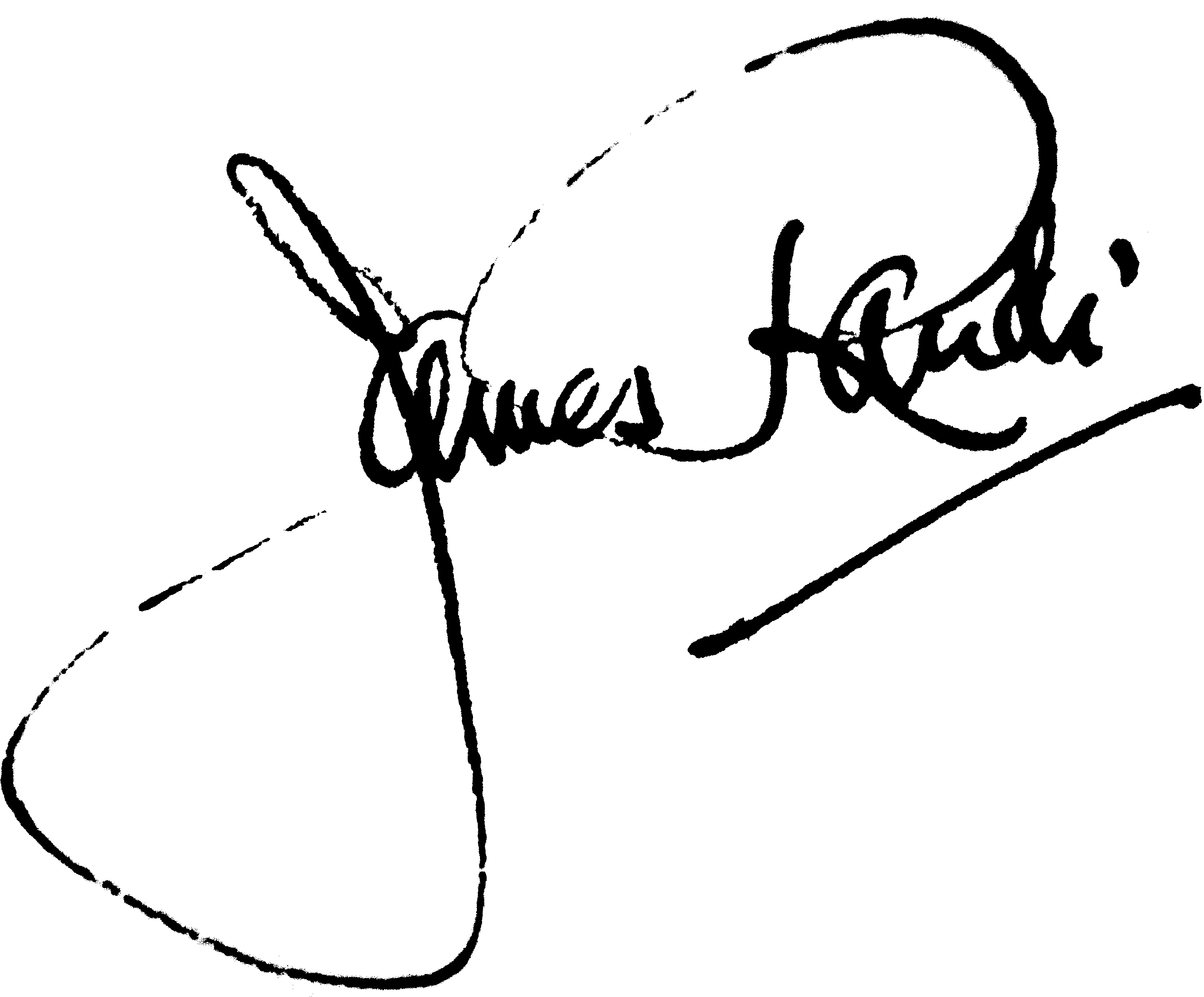

James Randi (born Randall James Hamilton Zwinge; August 7, 1928 – October 20, 2020) was a Canadian-American stage magician, author, and scientific skeptic who extensively challenged paranormal and pseudoscientific claims. He was the co-founder of the Committee for Skeptical Inquiry (CSI), and founder of the James Randi Educational Foundation (JREF). Randi began his career as a magician under the stage name The Amazing Randi and later chose to devote most of his time to investigating paranormal, occult, and supernatural claims. Randi retired from practicing magic at age 60, and from his foundation at 87.

Although often referred to as a "debunker", Randi said he disliked the term's connotations and preferred to describe himself as an "investigator". He wrote about paranormal phenomena, skepticism, and the history of magic. He was a frequent guest on The Tonight Show Starring Johnny Carson, famously exposing fraudulent faith healer Peter Popoff, and was occasionally featured on the television program Penn & Teller: Bullshit!.

Before Randi's retirement, JREF sponsored the One Million Dollar Paranormal Challenge, which offered a prize of $1 million to applicants who could demonstrate evidence of any paranormal, supernatural, or occult power or event under test conditions agreed to by both parties.

== Early life ==
Randi was born on August 7, 1928, in Toronto, Canada. He was the son of Marie Alice (née Paradis; 1906–1987) and George Randall Zwinge (1903–1967), an executive at Bell Telephone Company. He was of French, Danish and Austrian descent. He had a younger brother and sister. He took up magic after seeing Harry Blackstone Sr. and reading conjuring books while spending 13 months in a body cast following a bicycle accident. He confounded doctors, who expected he would never walk again. He often skipped classes, and at 17, dropped out of high school to perform as a conjurer in a carnival roadshow. He practiced as a mentalist in local nightclubs and at Toronto's Canadian National Exhibition and wrote for Montreal's tabloid press. As a teenager, he stumbled upon a spiritualist church where the pastor claimed to read minds. The pastor was actually using a version of the "one-ahead" technique to convince churchgoers of his divine powers. When Randi interrupted the performance and showed the parishioners how the trick worked, the pastor's wife called the police and Randi spent four hours in a jail cell. This inspired his career as a scientific skeptic. Randi later said of this experience, "That was the worst four hours the world's 'psychics' ever spent, although they didn't know it at the time."

In his 20s, Randi posed as an astrologer, and to establish that they merely were doing simple tricks, he briefly wrote an astrological column in the Canadian tabloid Midnight under the name "Zo-ran" by simply shuffling up items from newspaper astrology columns and pasting them randomly into a column. In his 30s, Randi worked in the UK, Europe, Philippine nightclubs, and Japan. He witnessed many tricks that were presented as being supernatural.

== Career ==
=== Magician ===
Randi being submerged, 1956

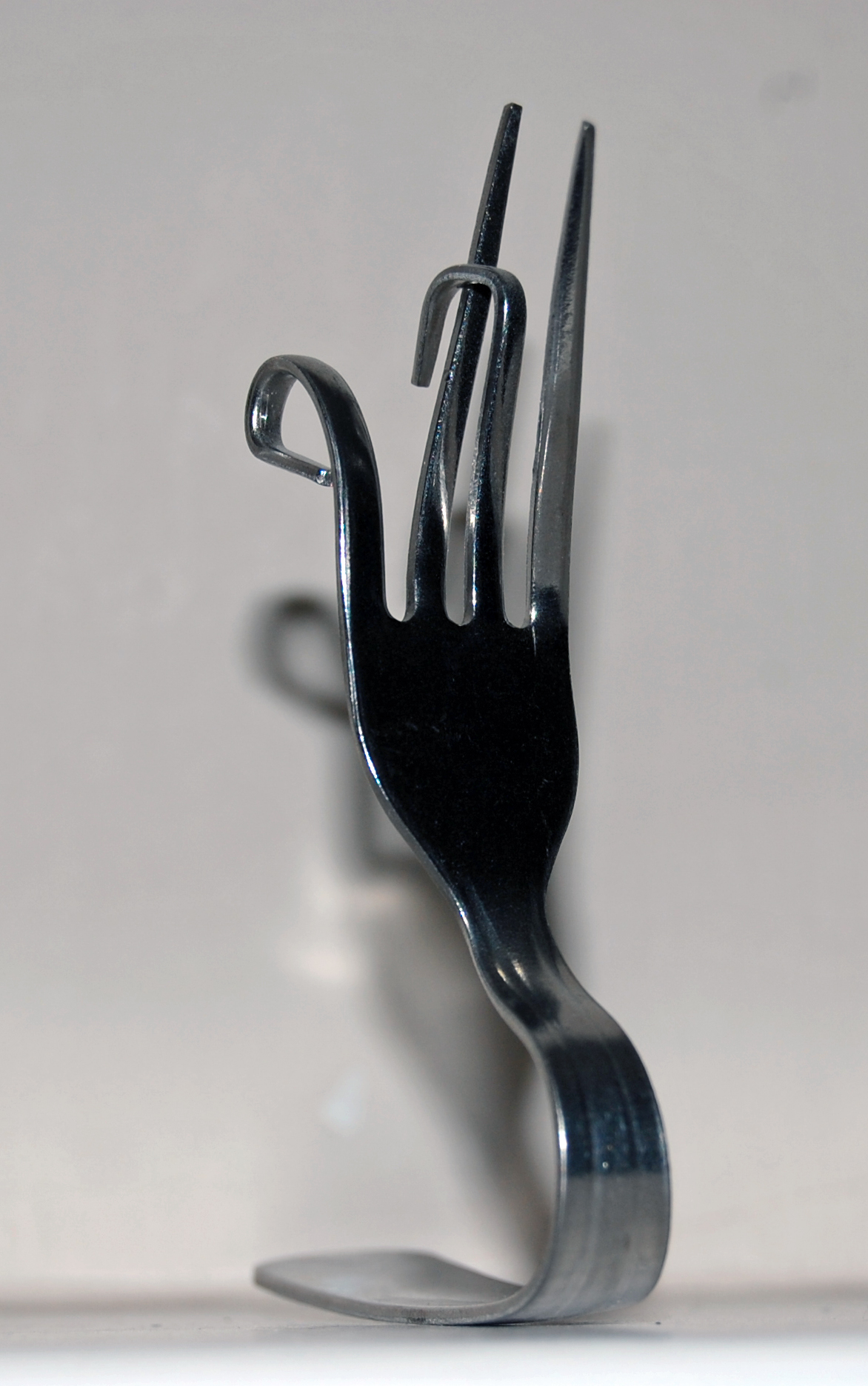
A fork bent by Randi

Although defining himself as a conjuror, Randi began a career as a professional stage magician and escapologist in 1946. He initially presented himself under his real name, Randall Zwinge, which he later dropped in favor of "The Amazing Randi". Early in his career, he performed numerous escape acts from jail cells and safes around the world. On February 7, 1956, he appeared live on NBC's Today show, where he remained for 104 minutes in a sealed metal coffin that had been submerged in a hotel swimming pool, breaking what was said to be Harry Houdini's record of 93 minutes, though Randi called attention to the fact that he was much younger than Houdini had been when he established the original record in 1926.

Randi was a frequent guest on the Long John Nebel program on New York City radio station WOR, and did character voices for commercials. After Nebel moved to WNBC in 1964, Randi was given Nebel's time slot on WOR, where he hosted The Amazing Randi Show until January 1966, and often had guests who defended paranormal claims, among them Randi's then-friend James W. Moseley. Randi stated that he was fired from WOR over complaints from the archbishop of New York that Randi had said on-air that "Jesus Christ was a religious nut," a claim that Randi disputed.

Randi also hosted numerous television specials and went on several world tours. As "The Amazing Randi" he appeared regularly on the New York-based children's television series Wonderama from 1959 to 1967. In 1970, he auditioned for a revival of the 1950s children's show The Magic Clown, which showed briefly in Detroit and in Kenya, but was never picked up. In the February 2, 1974, issue of the British conjuring magazine Abracadabra, Randi, in defining the community of magicians, stated: "I know of no calling which depends so much upon mutual trust and faith as does ours." In the December 2003 issue of The Linking Ring, the monthly publication of the International Brotherhood of Magicians, it is stated: "Perhaps Randi's ethics are what make him Amazing" and "The Amazing Randi not only talks the talk, he walks the walk."

During Alice Cooper's 1973–1974 Billion Dollar Babies tour, Randi performed on stage both as a mad dentist and as Cooper's executioner. He also built several of the stage props, including the guillotine. In a 1976 performance for the Canadian TV special World of Wizards, Randi escaped from a straitjacket while suspended upside-down over Niagara Falls.

Randi has been accused of actually using "psychic powers" to perform acts such as spoon bending. According to James Alcock, at a meeting where Randi was duplicating the performances of Uri Geller, a professor from the University at Buffalo shouted out that Randi was a fraud. Randi said: "Yes, indeed, I'm a trickster, I'm a cheat, I'm a charlatan, that's what I do for a living. Everything I've done here was by trickery." The professor shouted back: "That's not what I mean. You're a fraud because you're pretending to do these things through trickery, but you're actually using psychic powers and misleading us by not admitting it." A similar event involved Senator Claiborne Pell, a confirmed believer in psychic phenomena. When Randi personally demonstrated to Pell that he could reveal—by simple trickery—a concealed drawing that had been secretly made by the senator, Pell refused to believe that it was a trick, saying: "I think Randi may be a psychic and doesn't realize it." Randi consistently denied having any paranormal powers or abilities.

Randi was a member of the Society of American Magicians (SAM), the International Brotherhood of Magicians (IBM), and The Magic Circle in the UK, holding the rank of "Member of the Inner Magic Circle with Gold Star."

=== Author ===
Randi wrote ten books, among them Conjuring (1992), a biographical history of prominent magicians. The book is subtitled Being a Definitive History of the Venerable Arts of Sorcery, Prestidigitation, Wizardry, Deception, & Chicanery and of the Mountebanks & Scoundrels Who have Perpetrated these Subterfuges on a Bewildered Public, in short, MAGIC! The book's cover indicates it is by "James Randi, Esq., A Contrite Rascal Once Dedicated to these Wicked Practices but Now Almost Totally Reformed". The book features the most influential magicians and tells some of their history, often in the context of strange deaths and careers on the road. This work expanded on Randi's second book, Houdini, His Life and Art. This illustrated work was published in 1976 and was co-authored with Bert Sugar. It focuses on the professional and private life of Houdini.

Randi's book The Magic World of the Amazing Randi (1989) was intended as a children's introduction to magic tricks. In addition to his magic books, he wrote several educational works about paranormal and pseudoscientific claims. These include biographies of Uri Geller and Nostradamus, as well as reference material on other major paranormal figures. In 2011, he was working on A Magician in the Laboratory, which recounted his application of skepticism to science. He was a member of the all-male literary banqueting club the Trap Door Spiders, which served as the basis of his friend Isaac Asimov's fictional group of mystery solvers, the Black Widowers.

Other books by Randi include Flim-Flam! (1982), The Faith Healers (1987), James Randi, Psychic Investigator (1991), Test Your ESP Potential (1982), and An Encyclopedia of Claims, Frauds, and Hoaxes of the Occult and Supernatural (1995).

Randi was a regular contributor to Skeptic magazine, penning the "'Twas Brillig ..." column, and also served on its editorial board. He was a frequent contributor to Skeptical Inquirer magazine, published by the Committee for Skeptical Inquiry, of which he was also a fellow.

=== Skeptic ===
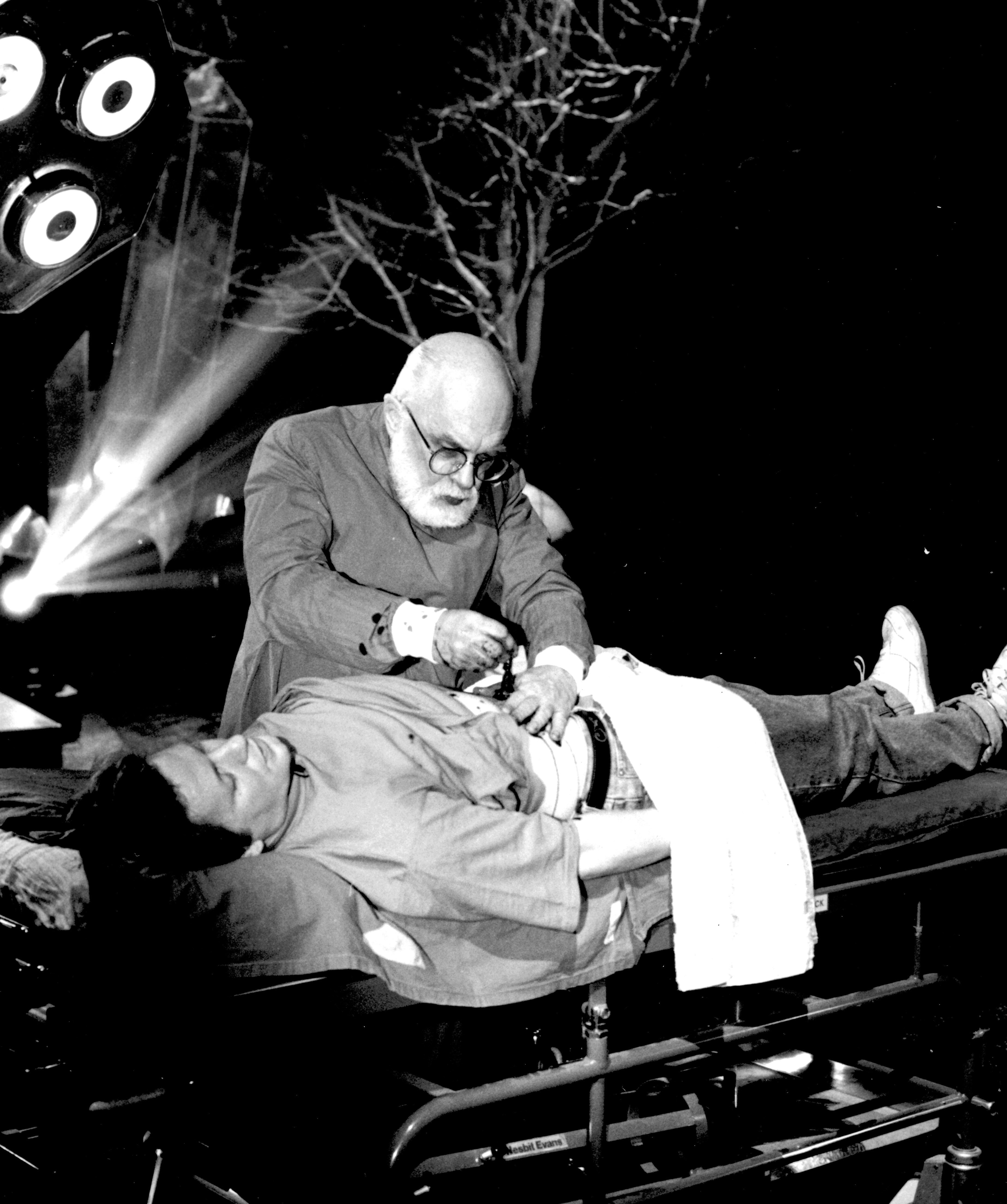
Randi using sleight of hand to duplicate "psychic surgery" on his Open Media series for ITV in 1991

Randi gained the international spotlight in 1972 when he publicly challenged the claims of Uri Geller. He accused Geller of being nothing more than a charlatan and a fraud who used standard magic tricks to accomplish his allegedly paranormal feats, and he presented his claims in the book The Truth About Uri Geller (1982).

Believing that it was important to get columnists and TV personalities to challenge Geller and others like him, Randi and CSICOP reached out in an attempt to educate them. Randi said that CSICOP had a "very substantial influence on the printed media ... in those days." During this effort, Randi made contact with Johnny Carson and discovered that he was "very much on our side. He wasn't only a comedian ... he was a great thinker." According to Randi, when he was on The Tonight Show, Carson broke his usual protocol of not talking with guests before their entrance on stage, but instead would ask what Randi wanted to be emphasized in the interview. "He wanted to be aware of how he could help me."

In 1973, Geller appeared on The Tonight Show, and this appearance is recounted in the Nova documentary "Secrets of the Psychics". (Note: A two-minute clip of this documentary with the Geller segment has been widely circulated on the Internet since Randi acquired permission to use it from NBC, and Carson paid for the expensive and complex transfer from the original, physically degraded, two-inch videotape recording.) (Note: James Randi discussed obtaining the clip of Uri Geller on The Tonight Show.)

In the documentary, Randi says that Carson "had been a magician himself and was skeptical" of Geller's claimed paranormal powers, so before the date of taping, Randi was asked "to help prevent any trickery". Per Randi's advice, the show prepared its own props without informing Geller, and did not let Geller or his staff "anywhere near them". When Geller joined Carson on stage, he appeared surprised that he was not going to be interviewed, but instead was expected to display his abilities using the provided articles. Geller said "This scares me" and "I'm surprised because before this program your producer came and he read me at least 40 questions you were going to ask me." Geller was unable to display any paranormal abilities, saying "I don't feel strong" and expressing his displeasure at feeling like he was being "pressed" to perform by Carson. According to Adam Higginbotham's November 7, 2014, article in The New York Times:

The result was a legendary immolation, in which Geller offered up flustered excuses to his host as his abilities failed him again and again. "I sat there for 22 minutes, humiliated," Geller told me, when I spoke to him in September. "I went back to my hotel, devastated. I was about to pack up the next day and go back to Tel Aviv. I thought, That's it—I'm destroyed."

However, this appearance on The Tonight Show, which Carson and Randi had orchestrated to debunk Geller's claimed abilities, backfired. According to Higginbotham:

To Geller's astonishment, he was immediately booked on The Merv Griffin Show. He was on his way to becoming a paranormal superstar. "That Johnny Carson show made Uri Geller," Geller said. To an enthusiastically trusting public, his failure only made his gifts seem more real: if he were performing magic tricks, they would surely work every time.

According to Higginbotham, this result caused Randi to realize that much more must be done to stop Geller and those like him. So in 1976, Randi approached Ray Hyman, a psychologist who had observed the tests of Geller's ability at Stanford and thought them slipshod, and suggested they create an organization dedicated to combating pseudoscience. Later that same year, together with Martin Gardner, a Scientific American columnist whose writing had helped hone Hyman's and Randi's skepticism, they formed the Committee for Scientific Investigation of Claims of the Paranormal (CSICOP).

Using donations and sales of their magazine, Skeptical Inquirer, they and secular humanist philosopher Paul Kurtz took seats on the executive board, with Isaac Asimov and Carl Sagan joining as founding members. Randi travelled the world on behalf of CSICOP, becoming its public face, and according to Hyman, the face of the skeptical movement.

András G. Pintér, producer and co-host of the European Skeptics Podcast, called Randi the grandfather of European skepticism by virtue of Randi "playing a role in kickstarting several European organizations."

Geller sued Randi and CSICOP for $15 million in 1991 and lost. Geller's suit against CSICOP was thrown out in 1995, and he was ordered to pay $120,000 for filing a frivolous lawsuit. The legal costs Randi incurred used almost all of a $272,000 MacArthur Foundation grant awarded to Randi in 1986 for his work. Randi also dismissed Geller's claims that he was capable of the kind of psychic photography associated with the case of Ted Serios. It is a matter, Randi argued, of trick photography using a simple hand-held optical device. During the period of Geller's legal dispute, CSICOP's leadership, wanting to avoid becoming a target of Geller's litigation, demanded that Randi refrain from commenting on Geller. Randi refused and resigned, though he maintained a respectful relationship with the group, which in 2006 changed its name to the Committee for Skeptical Inquiry (CSI). In 2010, Randi was one of 16 new CSI fellows elected by its board.

Randi went on to write many articles criticizing beliefs and claims regarding the paranormal. He also demonstrated flaws in studies suggesting the existence of paranormal phenomena; in his Project Alpha hoax, Randi successfully planted two fake psychics in a privately funded psychic research experiment.

Randi appeared on numerous TV shows, sometimes to directly debunk the claimed abilities of fellow guests. In a 1981 appearance on That's My Line, Randi appeared opposite claimed psychic James Hydrick, who said that he could move objects with his mind and appeared to demonstrate this claim on live television by turning a page in a telephone book without touching it. Randi, having determined that Hydrick was surreptitiously blowing on the book, arranged foam packaging peanuts on the table in front of the telephone book for the demonstration. This prevented Hydrick from demonstrating his abilities, which would have been exposed when the blowing moved the packaging. Randi writes that, eventually, Hydrick "confessed everything".

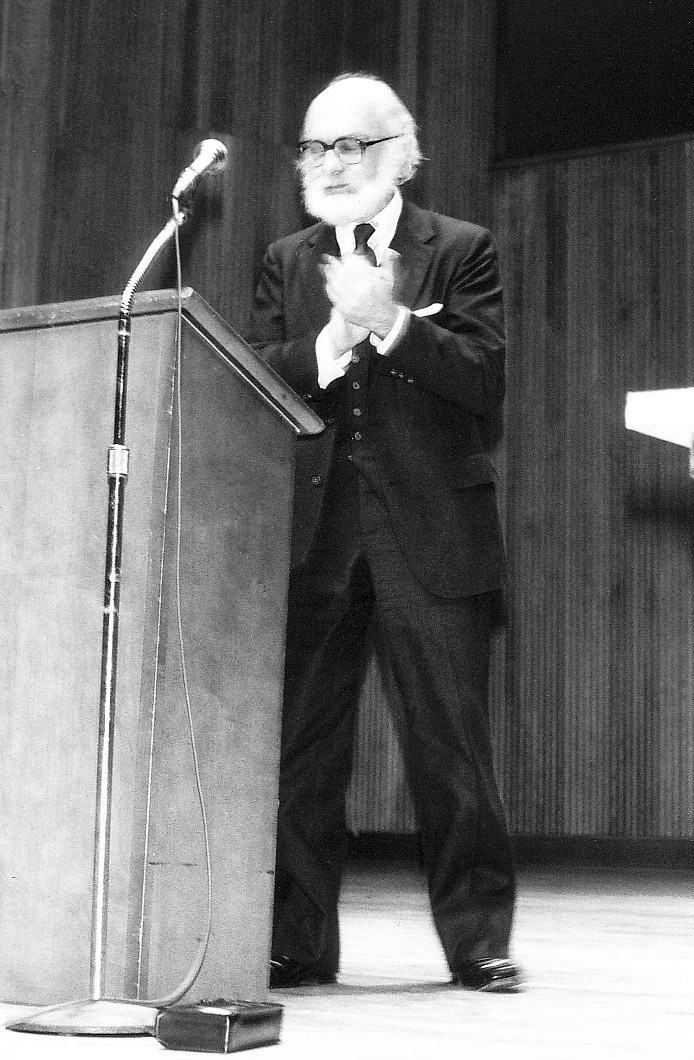
Randi speaking at the first CSICOP Conference, in Buffalo, New York, 1983

Randi was awarded a MacArthur Foundation Fellowship in 1986. The fellowship's five-year $272,000 grant helped support Randi's investigations of faith healers, including W. V. Grant, Ernest Angley, and Peter Popoff, whom Randi first exposed on The Tonight Show Starring Johnny Carson in April 1986. Hearing about his investigation of Popoff, Carson invited Randi onto his show without seeing the evidence he was going to reveal. Carson appeared stunned after Randi showed a brief video segment from one of Popoff's broadcasts showing him calling out a woman in the audience, revealed personal information about her that he claimed came from God, and then performed a laying-on-of-hands healing to drive the devil from her body. Randi then replayed the video, but with some of the sound dubbed in that he and his investigating team captured during the event using a radio scanner and recorder. Their scanner had detected the radio frequency Popoff's wife Elizabeth was using backstage to broadcast directions and information to a miniature radio receiver hidden in Popoff's left ear. That information had been gathered by Popoff's assistants, who had handed out "prayer cards" to the audience before the show, instructing them to write down all the information Popoff would need to pray for them.

The news coverage generated by Randi's exposé on The Tonight Show led to many TV stations dropping Popoff's show, eventually forcing him into bankruptcy in September 1987. However, the televangelist returned soon after with faith-healing infomercials that reportedly attracted more than $23 million in 2005 from viewers sending in money for promised healing and prosperity. The Canadian Centre for Inquiry's Think Again! TV documented one of Popoff's more recent performances before a large audience who gathered in Toronto on May 26, 2011, hoping to be saved from illness and poverty.

In February 1988, Randi tested the gullibility of the media by perpetrating a hoax of his own. By teaming up with Australia's 60 Minutes program and by releasing a fake press package, he built up publicity for a "spirit channeler" named Carlos, who was actually artist José Alvarez, Randi's partner. While performing as Carlos, Alvarez was prompted by Randi using sophisticated radio equipment. According to the 60 Minutes program on the Carlos hoax, "it was claimed that Alvarez would not have had the audience he did at the Opera House (and the resulting potential sales therefrom) had the media coverage been more aggressive (and factual)", though an analysis by The Skeptic's Tim Mendham concluded that, while the media coverage of Alvarez's appearances was not credulous, the hoax "at least showed that they could benefit by being a touch more sceptical". The hoax was exposed on 60 Minutes Australia; "Carlos" and Randi explained how they had pulled it off.

In his book The Faith Healers, Randi wrote that his anger and relentlessness arose from compassion for the victims of fraud. Randi was also critical of João de Deus, a.k.a. "John of God", a self-proclaimed psychic surgeon who had received international attention. Randi observed, referring to psychic surgery, "To any experienced conjurer, the methods by which these seeming miracles are produced are very obvious."

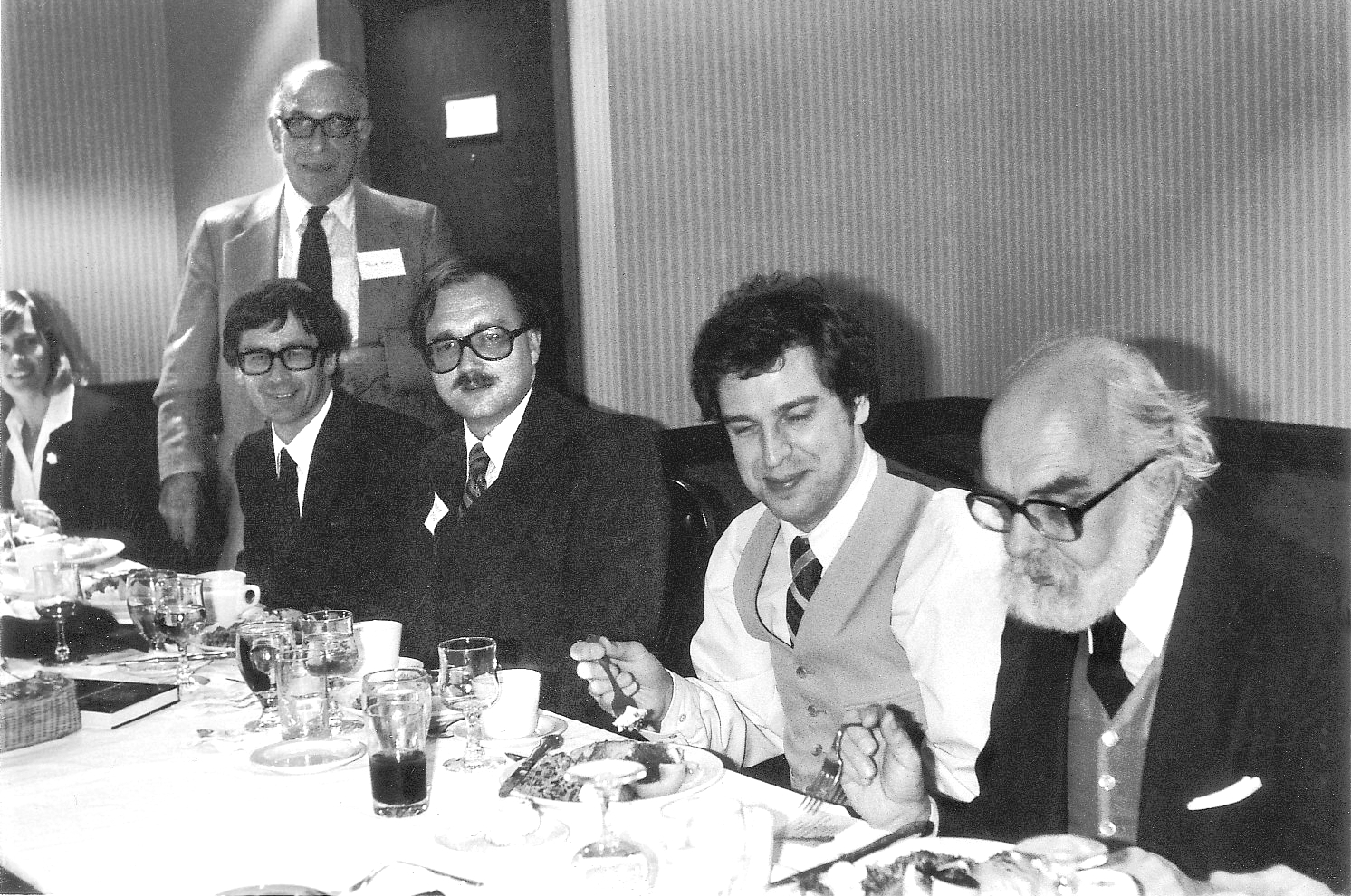
Randi (far right) at 1983 CSICOP Conference in Buffalo, New York, with (from left) Pip Smith, Philip J. Klass (standing), Dick Smith, Robert Sheaffer, and John Merrell

In 1982, Randi verified the abilities of Arthur Lintgen, a Philadelphia doctor, who was able to identify the classical music recorded on a vinyl LP solely by examining the grooves on the record. However, Lintgen did not claim to have any paranormal ability, merely knowledge of the way that the groove forms patterns on particular recordings.

In 1988, John Maddox, editor of the prominent science journal Nature, asked Randi to join the supervision and observation of the homeopathy experiments conducted by Jacques Benveniste's team. Once Randi's stricter protocol for the experiment was in place, the positive results could not be reproduced.

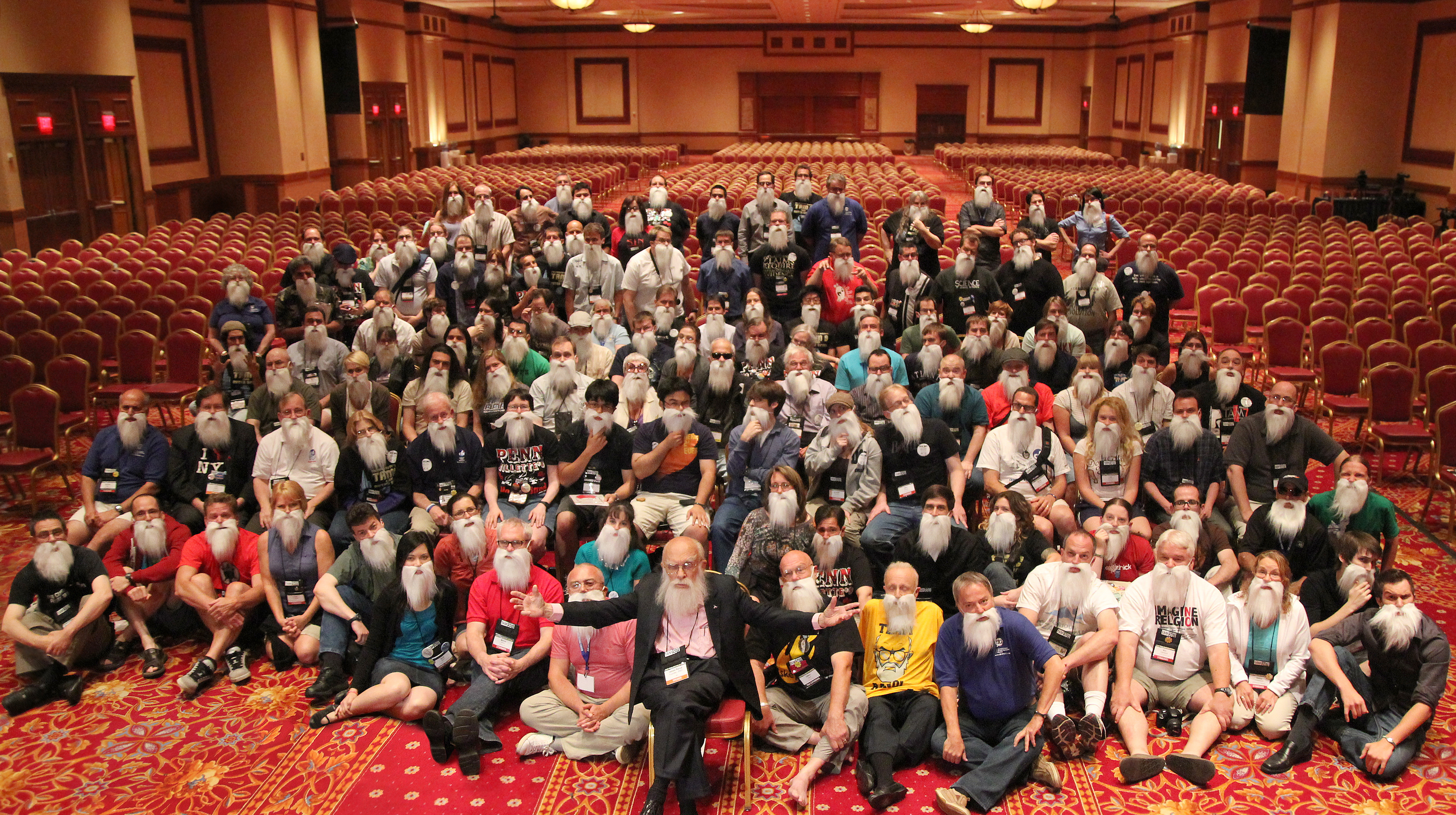
The James Randi Beard Photo, taken at the JREF Amaz!ng Meeting 9 ("TAM 9 From Outer Space"), July 16, 2011

Randi stated that Daniel Dunglas Home, who could allegedly play an accordion that was locked in a cage without touching it, was caught cheating on a few occasions, but the incidents were never made public. He also stated that the actual instrument in use was a one-octave mouth organ concealed under Home's large mustache and that other one-octave mouth organs were found in Home's belongings after his death. According to Randi, author William Lindsay Gresham told Randi "around 1960" that he had seen these mouth organs in the Home collection at the Society for Psychical Research (SPR). Eric J. Dingwall, who catalogued Home's collection on its arrival at the SPR, does not record the presence of the mouth organs. According to Peter Lamont, the author of an extensive Home biography, "It is unlikely Dingwall would have missed these or did not make them public." The fraudulent medium Henry Slade also played an accordion while held with one hand under a table. Slade and Home played the same pieces. They had at one time lived near each other in the U.S. The magician Chung Ling Soo exposed how Slade had performed the trick.

Randi distinguished between pseudoscience and "crackpot science". He regarded most of parapsychology as pseudoscience because of the way in which it is approached and conducted, but nonetheless saw it as a legitimate subject that "should be pursued", and from which real scientific discoveries may develop. Randi regarded crackpot science as "equally wrong" as pseudoscience, but with no scientific pretensions.

Despite multiple debunkings, Randi did not like to be called a "debunker", preferring to call himself a "skeptic" or an "investigator":

(...) if you go into a situation calling yourself a debunker then it is as if you have prejudged the topic. It's not neutral or scientific, and it can turn people against you.

Skeptics and magicians Penn & Teller credit Randi and his career as a skeptic for their own careers. During an interview at TAM! 2012, Penn stated that Flim-Flam! was an early influence on him, and said "If not for Randi there would not be Penn & Teller as we are today." He went on to say "Outside of my family ... no one is more important in my life. Randi is everything to me."

At the NECSS skeptic conference in 2017, Randi was asked by George Hrab what a "'skeptic coming of age ceremony' would look like" and Randi talked about what it was like as a child to learn about the speed of light and how that felt like he was looking into the past. Randi stated "More kids need to be stunned".

At The Amaz!ng Meeting in 2011 (TAM 9) the Independent Investigations Group (IIG) organized a tribute to Randi. The group gathered together with other attendees, put on fake white beards, and posed for a large group photo with Randi. At the CSICon in 2017, in absence of Randi, the IIG organized another group photo with leftover beards from the 2011 photo. After Randi was sent the photo, he replied, "I'm always very touched by any such expression. This is certainly no exception. You have my sincere gratitude. I suspect, however that a couple of those beards were fake. But I'm in a forgiving mood at the moment. I'm frankly very touched. I'll see you at the next CSICon. Thank you all."

In a 2019 Skeptical Inquirer magazine article, Harriet Hall, a friend of Randi, compares him to the fictional Albus Dumbledore. Hall describes their long white beards, flamboyant clothing, associated with a bird (Dumbledore with a phoenix and Randi with Pegasus). They both are caring and have "immense brainpower" and both "can perform impressive feats of magic". She states that Randi is one of "major inspirations for the skeptical work I do ... He's way better than Dumbledore!".

=== Exploring Psychic Powers ... Live television show ===
Exploring Psychic Powers ... Live was a two-hour television special aired live on June 7, 1989, wherein Randi examined several people claiming psychic powers. Hosted by actor Bill Bixby, the program offered $100,000 (Randi's $10,000 prize plus $90,000 put up by the show's syndicator, LBS Communications, Inc.) to anyone who could demonstrate genuine psychic powers.

- An astrologer, Joseph Meriwether, claimed that he was able to ascertain a person's astrological sign after talking with them for a few minutes. He was presented with twelve people, one at a time, each with a different astrological sign. They could not tell Meriwether their astrological sign or birth date, nor could they wear anything that would indicate it. After Meriwether talked to them, he had them go and sit in front of the astrological sign that he thought was theirs. By agreement, Meriwether needed to get ten of the 12 correct, to win. He got none correct.
- The next psychic, Barbara Martin, claimed to be able to read auras around people, claiming that auras were visible at least five inches above each person. She selected ten people from a group of volunteers who she said had clearly visible auras. On stage were erected ten screens, numbered 1 through 10, just tall enough to hide the volunteer while not hiding their aura. Unseen by Martin, some of the volunteers positioned themselves behind different screens, then she was invited to predict which screens hid volunteers by seeing their aura above. She stated that she saw an aura over all ten screens, but people were behind only four of the screens.
- A dowser, Forrest Bayes, claimed that he could detect water in a bottle inside a sealed cardboard box. He was shown twenty boxes and asked to indicate which boxes contained a water bottle. He selected eight of the boxes, which he said contained water, but it turned out that only five of the twenty contained water. Of the eight selected boxes, only one was revealed to contain water and one contained sand. It was not revealed whether any of the remaining six boxes contained water.
- A psychometric psychic, Sharon McLaren-Straz, claimed to be able to receive personal information about the owner of an object by handling the object itself. In order to avoid ambiguous statements, the psychic agreed to be presented with both a watch and a key from each of twelve different people. She was to match keys and watches to their owners. According to the prior agreement, she had to match at least nine out of the twelve sets, but she succeeded in only two.
- Professional crystal healer Valerie Swan attempted to use ESP to identify 250 Zener cards, guessing which of the five symbols was on each one. Random guessing should have resulted in about fifty correct guesses, so it was agreed in advance that Swan had to be right on at least eighty-two cards in order to demonstrate an ability greater than chance. However, she was able to get only fifty predictions correct, which is no better than random guessing.

=== James Randi Educational Foundation (JREF) ===
In 1996, Randi established the James Randi Educational Foundation. Randi and his colleagues publish in JREF's blog, Swift. Topics have included the interesting mathematics of the one-seventh area triangle, a classic geometric puzzle. In his weekly commentary, Randi often gave examples of what he considered the nonsense that he dealt with every day.

Beginning in 2003, the JREF annually hosted The Amaz!ng Meeting, a gathering of scientists, skeptics, and atheists. The last meeting was in 2015, coinciding with Randi's retirement from the JREF.

=== 2010s ===
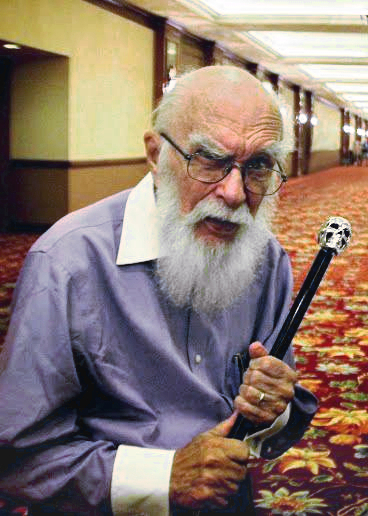
Randi with skull cane, 2014

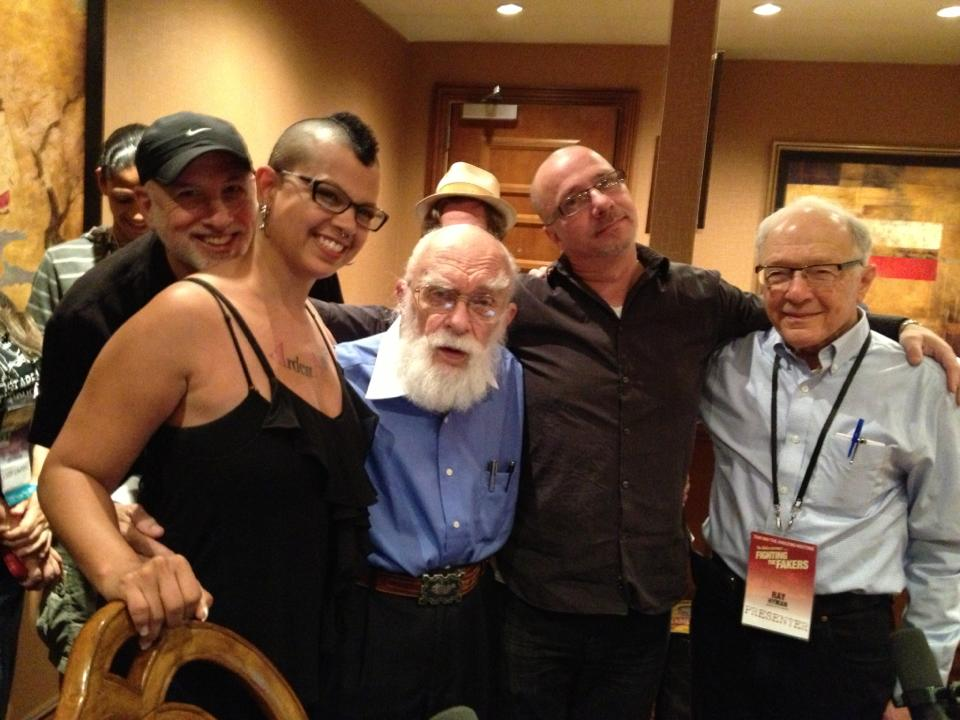
Participants in the "Skeptically Yours" podcast, recorded at The Amazing Meeting for skeptics in 2013. Left to right: singer/songwriter Gary Stockdale, podcaster Heather Henderson, Randi, comedian Emery Emery, and psychology professor Ray Hyman.

Randi began a series of conferences known as "The Amazing Meeting" (TAM) which quickly became the largest gathering of skeptics in the world, drawing audiences from Asia, Europe, South America, and the UK. It also attracted a large percentage of younger attendees. Randi was regularly featured on many podcasts, including The Skeptics Society's official podcast Skepticality and the Center for Inquiry's official podcast Point of Inquiry. From September 2006 onwards, he occasionally contributed to The Skeptics' Guide to the Universe podcast with a column called "Randi Speaks". In addition, The Amazing Show was a podcast in which Randi shared various anecdotes in an interview format.

In 2014, Part2Filmworks released An Honest Liar, a feature film documentary, written by Tyler Measom and Greg O'Toole, and directed and produced by Measom and Justin Weinstein. The film, which was funded through Kickstarter, focuses on Randi's life, his investigations, and his relationship with longtime partner José Alvarez (born Deyvi Orangel Peña Arteaga), to whom he was married in 2013. The film was screened at the Tribeca Film Festival, at Toronto's Hot Docs film festival, and at the June 2014 AFI Docs Festival in Silver Spring, Maryland, and Washington, D.C., where it won the Audience Award for Best Feature. It also received positive reviews from critics. The film was featured on the PBS Independent Lens series, shown in the U.S. and Canada, on March 28, 2016.

In December 2014, Randi flew to Australia to take part in "An Evening with James Randi" tour, organized by Think Inc. This tour included a screening of An Honest Liar followed by a "fireside chat" with Randi on stage. Cities visited were Adelaide, Perth, Brisbane, Melbourne, and Sydney. MC in Adelaide was Dr. Paul Willis with Richard Saunders interviewing Randi. MC in Perth was Jake Farr-Wharton with Richard Saunders interviewing Randi. MC for Brisbane, Melbourne and Sydney was Richard Saunders with Lawrence Leung interviewing Randi.

In 2017, Randi appeared in animated form on the website Holy Koolaid, in which he discussed the challenge of finding the balance between connecting sincerely with his audience and at the same time tricking/fooling them with an artful ruse, and indicated that this is a balance with which many magicians struggle.

== One Million Dollar Paranormal Challenge ==
The James Randi Educational Foundation (JREF) offered a prize of US$1,000,000 to anyone able to demonstrate a supernatural ability under scientific testing criteria agreed to by both sides. Based on the paranormal challenges of John Nevil Maskelyne and Houdini, the foundation began in 1996, when Randi put up $1,000 of his own money payable to anyone who could provide objective proof of the paranormal. The prize money grew to $1,000,000, and had formal published rules. No one progressed past the preliminary test, which was set up with parameters agreed to by both Randi and the applicant. He refused to accept any challengers who might suffer serious injury or death as a result of the testing.

On April 1, 2007, it was ruled that only persons with an established, nationally recognized media profile and the backing of a reputable academic were allowed to apply for the challenge, in order to avoid wasting JREF resources on frivolous claimants.

On Larry King Live, March 6, 2001, Larry King asked claimed medium Sylvia Browne if she would take the challenge and she agreed. Randi appeared with Browne on Larry King Live six months later, and she again appeared to accept his challenge; however, according to Randi, she ultimately refused to be tested, and the Randi Foundation kept a clock on its website recording the number of weeks since Browne allegedly accepted the challenge without following through, until Browne's death in November 2013.

During a subsequent appearance on Larry King Live on June 5, 2001, Randi challenged Rosemary Altea, another claimed medium, to undergo testing for the million dollars, but Altea refused to address the question. Instead, Altea replied only, "I agree with what he says, that there are many, many people who claim to be spiritual mediums, they claim to talk to the dead. There are many people, we all know this. There are cheats and charlatans everywhere." On January 26, 2007, Altea and Randi again appeared on the show, and Altea again refused to answer whether or not she would take the One Million Dollar Paranormal Challenge.

In October 2007, claimed psychic John Edward appeared on Headline Prime, hosted by Glenn Beck. When asked if he would take "the Amazing Randi's" challenge, Edward responded, "It's funny. I was on Larry King Live once, and they asked me the same question. And I made a joke [then], and I'll say the same thing here: why would I allow myself to be tested by somebody who's got an adjective as a first name?". Beck simply allowed Edward to continue, ignoring the challenge.

Randi asked British businessman Jim McCormick, the inventor of the bogus ADE 651 bomb detector, to take the challenge in October 2008. Randi called the ADE 651 "a useless quack device which cannot perform any other function than separating naive persons from their money. It's a fake, a scam, a swindle, and a blatant fraud. Prove me wrong and take the million dollars." There was no response from McCormick. According to Iraqi investigators, the ADE 651, which was corruptly sold to the Baghdad bomb squad, was responsible for the deaths of hundreds of civilians who died as a result of terrorist bombs which were not detected at checkpoints. On April 23, 2013, McCormick was convicted of three counts of fraud at the Old Bailey in London; he was subsequently sentenced to ten years' imprisonment for his part in the ADE 651 scandal, which Randi was the first to expose.

A public log of past participants in the Million Dollar Challenge exists. In 2015, after Randi's retirement, his foundation said the Million Dollar Challenge would no longer consider applicants unless they meet a set of minimum protocols, to reduce the amount of frivolous claims.

== Legal disputes ==
Randi was involved in a variety of legal disputes, but said that he had "never paid even one dollar or even one cent to anyone who ever sued me." However, he said, he had paid out large sums to defend himself in these suits.

=== Uri Geller ===
Randi met magician Uri Geller in the early 1970s, and found Geller to be "Very charming. Likable, beautiful, affectionate, genuine, forward-going, handsome—everything!" But Randi viewed Geller as a con-man, and began a long effort to expose him as a fraud. According to Randi, Geller tried to sue him several times, accusing him of libel. Geller never won, save for a ruling in a Japanese court that ordered Randi to pay Geller one-third of one per cent of what Geller had requested. This ruling was cancelled, and the matter dropped, when Geller decided to concentrate on another legal matter.

In May 1991, Geller sued Randi and CSICOP for $15 million on a charge of slander, after Randi told the International Herald Tribune that Geller had "tricked even reputable scientists" with stunts that "are the kind that used to be on the back of cereal boxes", referring to the old spoon-bending trick. The court dismissed the case and Geller had to settle at a cost to him of $120,000, after Randi produced a cereal box which bore instructions on how to do the spoon-bending trick. Geller's lawyer Don Katz was disbarred mid-way into this action and Geller ended up suing him. After failing to pay by the deadline imposed by the court, Geller was sanctioned an additional $20,000. Geller sued both Randi and CSICOP in the 1980s. CSICOP argued that the organization was not responsible for Randi's statements. The court agreed that including CSICOP was frivolous and dropped them from the action, leaving Randi to face the action alone, along with the legal costs. Geller was ordered to pay substantial damages, but only to CSICOP.

=== Other cases ===
In 1993, a jury in the U.S. District Court in Baltimore found Randi liable for defaming Eldon Byrd for calling him a child molester in a magazine story and a "shopping market molester" in a 1988 speech; however, the jury found that Byrd was not entitled to any monetary damages after hearing testimony that he had sexually molested and later married his sister-in-law. The jury also cleared the other defendant in the case, CSICOP.

Late in 1996, Randi launched a libel suit against a Toronto-area psychic named Earl Gordon Curley. Curley had made multiple objectionable comments about Randi on Usenet. Despite suggesting to Randi on Usenet that Randi should sue—Curley's comments implying that if Randi did not sue, then his allegations must be true—Curley seemed entirely surprised when Randi actually retained Toronto's largest law firm and initiated legal proceedings. The suit was eventually dropped in 1998 when Earl Curley died at the age of 51 of "alcohol toxicity".

Allison DuBois, on whose life the television series Medium was based, threatened Randi with legal action for using a photo of her from her website in his December 17, 2004, commentary without her permission. Randi removed the photo and subsequently used a caricature of DuBois when mentioning her on his site, beginning with his December 23, 2005, commentary.

Sniffex, producer of a dowsing bomb detection device, sued Randi and the JREF in 2007, and lost. Sniffex sued Randi for his comments regarding a government test in which the Sniffex device failed. The company was later investigated and charged with fraud.

== Views ==
=== Political views ===
Randi was a registered Democrat. In April 2009, he released a statement endorsing the legalization of most illegal drugs.

Randi had been reported as a believer in Social Darwinist theories, although he denounced the ideologies and movements that formed around the theories in 2013.

=== Views on religion ===
Randi's parents were members of the Anglican Church but rarely attended services. He attended Sunday school at St. Cuthbert's Church in Toronto a few times as a child, but he independently decided to stop going after receiving no answer to his request for proof of the teachings of the Church. (Note: Regarding his separation from religious training, Randi said that his statements in Sunday school such as "That sounded very unlikely," regarding contradictory and dubious biblical claims, were met with unsatisfactory answers, such as "It's in the Bible. It's in the holy book of God." He was given a note for his parents stating "Your boy Randi ... is not welcome at St. Cuthberts as he asks too many questions and he interrupts the teachers.")

In his essay "Why I Deny Religion, How Silly and Fantastic It Is, and Why I'm a Dedicated and Vociferous Bright", Randi, who identified himself as an atheist, opined that many accounts in religious texts, including the virgin birth, the miracles of Jesus Christ, and the parting of the Red Sea by Moses, are not believable. Randi refers to the Virgin Mary as being "impregnated by a ghost of some sort, and as a result produced a son who could walk on water, raise the dead, turn water into wine, and multiply loaves of bread and fishes" and questions how Adam and Eve's family "managed to populate the Earth without committing incest". He wrote that, compared to the Bible, "The Wizard of Oz is more believable. And much more fun."

Clarifying his view of atheism, Randi wrote "I've said it before: there are two sorts of atheists. One sort claims that there is no deity, the other claims that there is no evidence that proves the existence of a deity; I belong to the latter group, because if I were to claim that no god exists, I would have to produce evidence to establish that claim, and I cannot. Religious persons have by far the easier position; they say they believe in a deity because that's their preference, and they've read it in a book. That's their right."

In An Encyclopedia of Claims, Frauds, and Hoaxes of the Occult and Supernatural (1995), he examines various spiritual practices skeptically. Of the meditation techniques of Guru Maharaj Ji, he writes "Only the very naive were convinced that they had been let in on some sort of celestial secret." In 2003, he was one of the signers of the Humanist Manifesto.

Regarding his 2006 coronary artery bypass surgery, Randi was asked if he was tempted by religious ideas about an afterlife or if he went through it any differently than if he had been religious. Randi replied "I allowed Daniel Dennett to speak for me" referring to Dennett's essay "Thank Goodness", which Dennett wrote after a serious surgery. Summing up the essay, Randi continued:

(...) when he was recovering in the hospital he had people coming in and saying "Oh, thank God, you're doing this, that and the other", and he wrote this little essay, he said "No, never mind 'thank god' but I'll accept thank goodness. Thank the goodness of the anaesthesiologist. Thank the goodness of the nurses who empty my bedpan. Thank the goodness of the intern who sweeps the floor regularly so that I don't have to breathe too much dust. Thank the designers and makers of Dacron."

All of these things, he said, "Yes, thank their goodness but don't thank a mythical being."

And, essentially that's a contraction of it, rather severely, but that's the way I feel, yes.

In a discussion with Kendrick Frazier at CSICon 2016, Randi stated "I think that a belief in a deity is ... an unprovable claim ... and a rather ridiculous claim. It is an easy way out to explain things to which we have no answer." He then summarized his current concern with religious belief as follows: "A belief in a god is one of the most damaging things that infests humanity at this particular moment in history. It may improve, and I see signs that it may be improving, and I'll leave it at that."

== Personal life and death ==
When Randi hosted his own radio show in the 1960s, he lived in a small house in Rumson, New Jersey, that featured a sign on the premises that read: "Randi—Charlatan".

In the 1970s and 1980s, Randi supported seven foster children.

In 1987, Randi became a naturalized citizen of the United States. Randi said that one reason he became an American citizen was an incident while he was on tour with Alice Cooper, during which the Royal Canadian Mounted Police searched the band's lockers during a performance, completely ransacking the room, but finding nothing illegal.

In February 2006, Randi underwent coronary artery bypass surgery. The weekly commentary updates to his Web site were made by guests while he was hospitalized. Randi recovered after his surgery and was able to help organize and attend The Amaz!ng Meeting in 2007 in Las Vegas, Nevada, his annual convention of scientists, magicians, skeptics, atheists, and freethinkers.

Randi was diagnosed with colorectal cancer in June 2009. He had a series of small tumors removed from his intestines during laparoscopic surgery. He announced the diagnosis a week later at The Amaz!ng Meeting 7, as well as the fact that he was scheduled to begin chemotherapy in the following weeks. He also said at the conference: "One day, I'm gonna die. That's all there is to it. Hey, it's too bad, but I've got to make room. I'm using a lot of oxygen and such—I think it's good use of oxygen myself, but of course, I'm a little prejudiced on the matter."

Randi underwent his final chemotherapy session in December 2009, an experience that he said was not as unpleasant as he had imagined it might be. In a video posted in April 2010, Randi stated that he had been given a clean bill of health.

In a 2010 blog entry, Randi came out as gay, a move he said was inspired by seeing the 2008 biographical drama film Milk.

Randi married Venezuelan artist José Alvarez (born Deyvi Orangel Peña Arteaga) on July 2, 2013, in Washington, D.C. In 1986, Randi met Alvarez in a Fort Lauderdale public library after he had recently moved to Florida. Alvarez, who was then known as Peña, had left his native land in fear of his life after being threatened for being homosexual. The alias Peña used, Jose Alvarez, was already an actual person in the United States. The identity confusion caused the real Alvarez some legal and financial difficulties. Peña was arrested for identity theft and faced deportation. They resided in Plantation, Florida.

In the 1993 documentary Secrets of the Psychics, Randi stated, "I've never involved myself in narcotics of any kind; I don't smoke; I don't drink, because that can easily just fuzz the edges of my rationality, fuzz the edges of my reasoning powers, and I want to be as aware as I possibly can. That means giving up a lot of fantasies that might be comforting in some ways, but I'm willing to give that up in order to live in an actually real world, as close as I can get to it".

In a video released in October 2017, Randi revealed that he had recently suffered a minor stroke, and that he was under medical advice not to travel during his recovery, so would be unable to attend CSICon 2017 in Las Vegas later that month.

Randi died at his home on October 20, 2020, at the age of 92. The James Randi Educational Foundation attributed his death to "age-related causes". The Center for Inquiry said that Randi "was the public face of skeptical inquiry, bringing a sense of fun and mischievousness to a serious mission." Kendrick Frazier said, as part of the statement, "Despite his ferocity in challenging all forms of nonsense, in person he was a kind and gentle man."

== Awards and honors ==
| | Award or honor |
|---|---|
| 1977 | Visiting Magician of the Year, Academy of Magical Arts & Sciences at the Magic Castle in Hollywood. |
| 1978 | Garden State Magicians' award. |
| 1981 | Asteroid 3163 Randi was named after James Randi, who had always been an active amateur observer. His friend Carl Sagan encouraged his interest. Certificate of appreciation at the MIT Club of Boston. Designated Grand Master of Magic by Hocus Pocus Magazine. |
| 1983 | Blackstone Cup, International Platform Association as Outstanding Speaker (won again in 1987). |
| 1984 | Honorary membership, Bay Surgical Society of Los Angeles. |
| 1986 | A $273,000 MacArthur Foundation Fellowship was awarded to James Randi for his investigations of the claims of Uri Geller and TV "faith healers". Honorary membership, Israeli Society for Promoting the Art of Magic. |
| 1987 | Special fellowship, Academy of Magical Arts & Sciences in Los Angeles. Certificate of Appreciation, Ring 254 of the International Brotherhood of Magicians. Award of Merit, Assembly 22 of the Society of American Magicians. |
| 1988 | National Consumer Service Award, National Council Against Health Fraud. International Ambassador of Magic, Society of American Magicians. |
| 1989 | Joseph A. Burton Forum Award, American Physical Society. Gold Medal, University of Ghent. |
| 1990 | Humanist Distinguished Service Award, American Humanist Association. Thomas Paine Award, Baton Rouge Proponents of Rational Inquiry & Scientific Methods. |
| 1992 | Commemorative Medal with Golden Wreath, Hungarian Society for the Dissemination of Scientific Knowledge. |
| 1996 | Distinguished Skeptic Award, Committee for Skeptical Inquiry (CSICOP). |
| 1997 | Lifetime Achievement Award, International Brotherhood of Magicians. "One of the 100 Best People in the World, people who make our lives richer or larger or happier," Esquire magazine. Award, Science & Engineering Society of the National Security Agency. |
| 1999 | "In Defense of Reason" Special Lifetime Achievement Award, Comitato Italiano per il Controllo dell Affermazioni sui Paranormale. |
| 2000 | Distinguished Lecturer Award, Nova Southeastern University. |
| 2002 | Presidential Citation, International Brotherhood of Magicians. |
| 2003 | First Richard Dawkins Award. |
| 2007 | Philip J. Klass Award. |
| 2008 | Lifetime Achievement Award, Independent Investigations Group (IIG). Previous recipients Carl Sagan and Harry Houdini. |
| 2009 | In Praise of Reason Award, Committee for Skeptical Inquiry. |
| 2010 | Elected a Committee for Skeptical Inquiry Fellow. |
| 2012 | Lifetime Achievement Fellowship, Academy of Magical Arts. Lifetime Achievement Award, American Humanist Association. Lifetime Achievement Award, Australian Skeptics Inc. |
| 2016 | Heinz Oberhummer Award for Science Communication, 2016; Lifetime Achievement Award, Humanist Association of Canada. |
| | James Randi was one of very few members of the UK Magic Circle to be granted their highest order: Member of the Inner Magic Circle With Gold Star (MIMC). |

== World records ==
The following are Guinness World Records:

- Randi was in a sealed casket underwater for one hour and 44 minutes, breaking the previous record of one hour and 33 minutes set by Harry Houdini on August 5, 1926.
- Randi was encased in a block of ice for 55 minutes.

Long version of audio recorded at CSICon, October 2016

== Bibliography ==
- Randi, James; Sugar, Bert Randolph (1976). Houdini, His Life and Art. New York: Grosset & Dunlap. ISBN 978-0448125527. OCLC 3017457.
- —— (1982). Flim-Flam!: Psychics, ESP, Unicorns, and Other Delusions. Introduction by Isaac Asimov. Buffalo, NY: Prometheus Books. ISBN 978-0879751982. LCCN 82060953. OCLC 9066769.
- —— (1982). Test Your ESP Potential: A Complete Kit With Instructions, Scorecards, and Apparatus. New York: Dover Publications. ISBN 978-0486242699. OCLC 7924713.
- —— (1982) [Originally published 1975 as The Magic of Uri Geller; New York: Ballantine Books]. The Truth About Uri Geller. New York: Prometheus Books. ISBN 978-0879751999. OCLC 9164994.
- —— (1987). The Faith Healers. Foreword by Carl Sagan. Buffalo, NY: Prometheus Books. ISBN 978-0879753696. OCLC 16353426.
- —— (1989). The Magic World of the Amazing Randi. Holbrook, MA: Adams Media Corporation. ISBN 978-1558509825. OCLC 21303371.
- —— (1990). The Mask of Nostradamus: The Prophecies of the World's Most Famous Seer. Charles Scribner's Sons. ISBN 978-0684190563. OCLC 824193656.
- —— (1991). James Randi: Psychic Investigator. London: Boxtree Ltd. ISBN 978-1852831448. OCLC 26359284. Companion book to the Open Media/Granada Television series.
- —— (1992). Conjuring: Being a Definitive History of the Venerable Arts of Sorcery, Prestidigitation, Wizardry, Deception, & Chicanery and of the Mountebanks & Scoundrels Who have Perpetrated these Subterfuges on a Bewildered Public, in short, Magic! (1st ed.). New York: St. Martin's Press. ISBN 978-0312097714. OCLC 640909937.
- —— (1995). An Encyclopedia of Claims, Frauds, and Hoaxes of the Occult and Supernatural. Introduction by Arthur C. Clarke (1st ed.). New York: St. Martin's Press. ISBN 978-0312151195. OCLC 35978760. (Online version)

== Television and film appearances ==
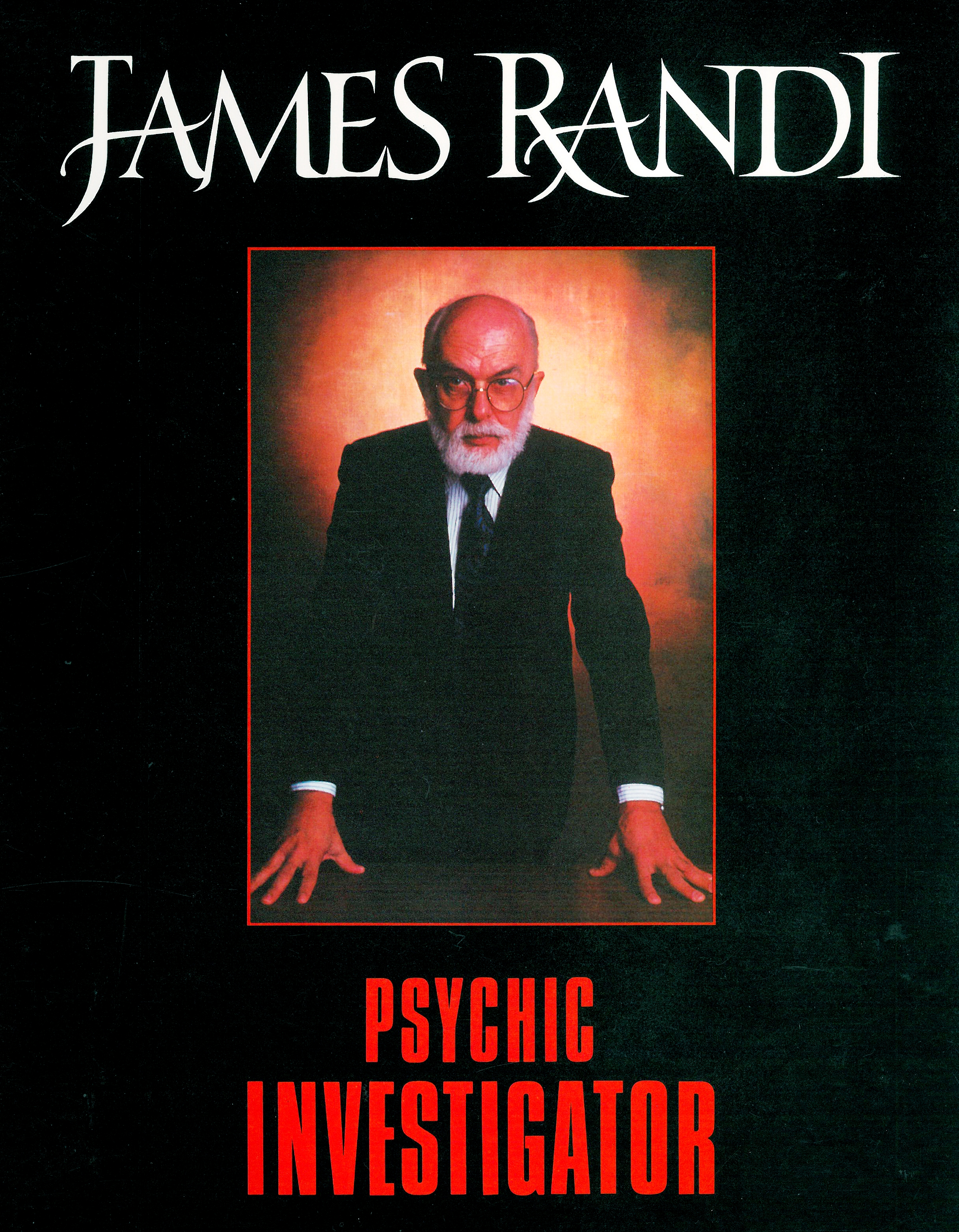
Publicity material for ITV series "James Randi: Psychic Investigator" produced by Open Media in 1991

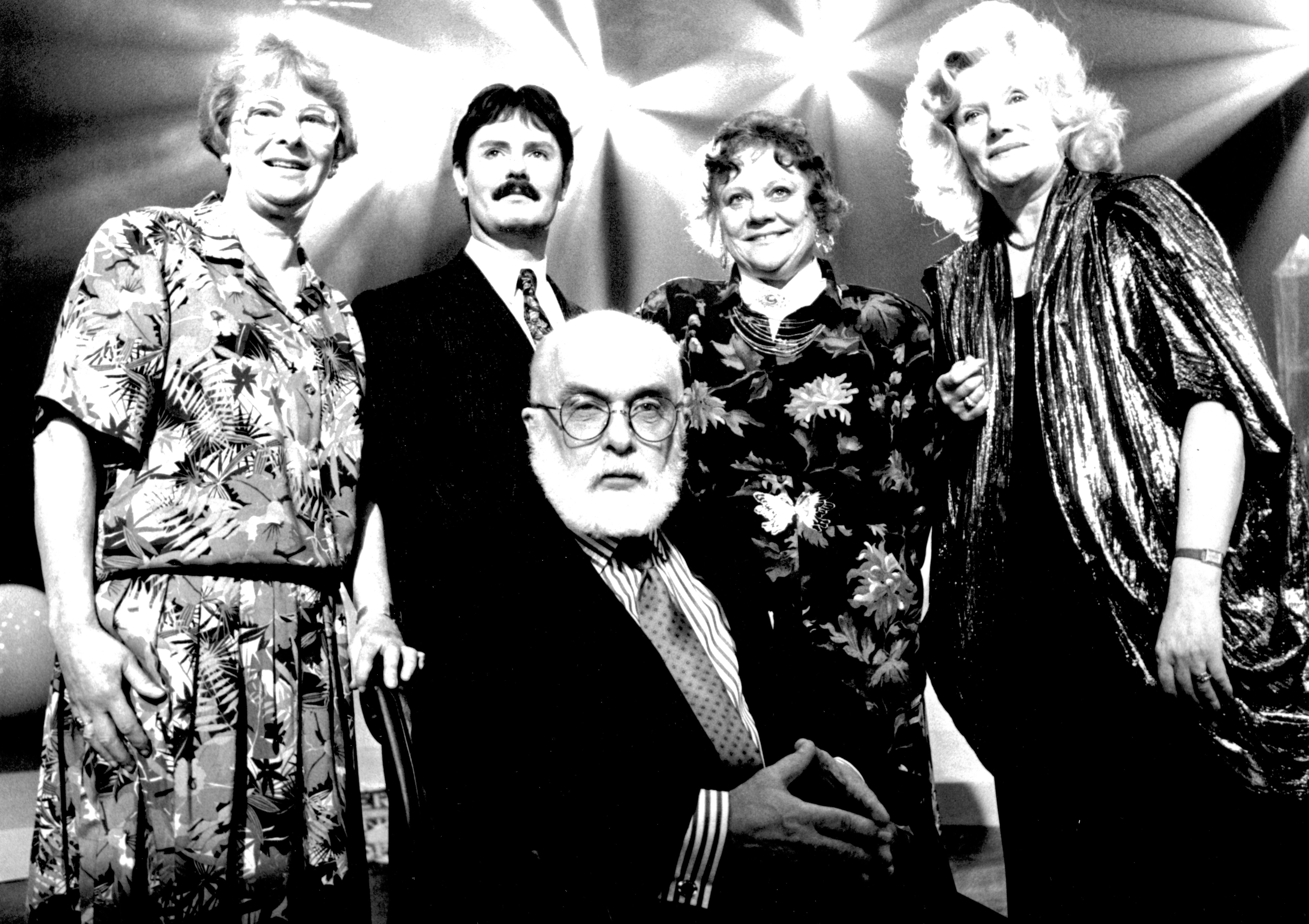
With guests on ITV series "James Randi: Psychic Investigator" produced by Open Media in 1991

=== As an actor ===
- Is There Sex After Death? (1971) as Seance Medium
- Good to See You Again, Alice Cooper (1974) as the Dentist/Executioner
- Ragtime (1981) (stunt coordinator: Houdini)
- Penn & Teller's Invisible Thread (1987) (TV)
- Penn & Teller Get Killed (1989) as the 3rd Rope Holder
- Beyond Desire (1994) as the Coroner

=== Appearing as himself ===
- Wonderama (1959–1967) (TV) as The Amazing Randi
- I've Got a Secret (1965) (TV) as The Amazing Randi
- Sesame Street Test Show 1 (1969) (TV) as The Amazing Randi
- Happy Days – "The Magic Show" (1978) as the Amazing Randi
- Zembla, 'De trucs van Char' (The tricks Char uses). (March 2008)
- ZDF German TV (2007)
- Wild Wild Web (1999)
- West 57th (1980s)
- Welt der Wunder – Kraft der Gedanken (January 2008)
- Today (many appearances)
- The Don Lane Show (Australia)
- That's My Line (1981) (Appeared with James Hydrick)
- The View (ABC) multiple appearances 1997 onwards
- The Tonight Show Starring Johnny Carson (32 appearances between 1973 and 1993 plus repeats)
- The Secret Cabaret (produced by Open Media for Channel 4 in the UK)
- The Power of Belief (October 6, 1998) (ABC News Special) (TV)
- People are Talking (1980s)
- The Patterson Show (1970s)
- Superpowers? (an Equinox documentary made by Open Media for Channel 4 in 1990)
- After Dark (September 3, 1988, and September 9, 1989)
- Weird Thoughts, Open Media discussion hosted by Tony Wilson for BBC TV, with Mary Beard and others, 1994
- The Art of Magic (1998) (TV)
- The Ultimate Psychic Challenge (Discovery Channel/Channel 4) (2003)
- Spotlight on James Randi (2002) (TV)
- Secrets of the Super Psychics (Channel 4/The Learning Channel), produced by Open Media, 1997/8
- Scams, Schemes, and Scoundrels (A&E Special) (March 30, 1997)
- RAI TV Italy (1991)
- Politically Incorrect with Bill Maher
- Penn & Teller: Bullshit! several appearances
  - "End of the World" (2003) TV Episode
  - "ESP" (2003) TV Episode
  - "Signs from Heaven" (2005) TV Episode
- The Oprah Winfrey Show 2 episodes
- Lawrence Leung's Unbelievable (Australia) TV Episode
- Nova: "Secrets of the Psychics" (1993)
- Mitä ihmettä? (Finland) (2003) TV Series
- Midday (Australia) (1990s)
- Magic or Miracle? (1983) TV special
- Magic (2004) (mini) TV Series
- Larry King Live (CNN) (June 5, 2001, September 3, 2001, January 26, 2007, several more)
- James Randi: Psychic Investigator (1991) (Open Media series for the ITV network)
- James Randi Budapesten – Hungarian documentary
- Inside Edition – (1991, 2006, and 2007) TV
- Horizon – "Homeopathy: The Test" (2002) BBC/UK TV Episode
- Dead Men Talking (The Biography Channel) (2007)
- Fornemmelse for snyd (2003) TV Series (also archive footage) Denmark
- Extraordinary People – "The Million Dollar Mind Reader" (September 2008).
- Exploring Psychic Powers ... Live (June 7, 1989; hosted by Bill Bixby)
- CBS This Morning (1990s)
- Anderson Cooper 360°, CNN (January 19, 2007, and January 30, 2007)
- A Question of Miracles (HBO) (1999)
- 20/20 (ABC) (May 11, 2007)
- "Captain Disillusion" Randi + Pantry Ghost...debunk? (June 18, 2009)
- An Honest Liar (2014, aired as Exposed: Magicians, Psychics and Frauds on BBC Storyville)

== Appearances in other media ==
- Randi was featured as the cover story for the November 1981 issue of Dynamite magazine.
- In 2007, Randi delivered a TED talk in which he discussed psychic fraud, homeopathy, and his foundation's Million Dollar Challenge.
- Randi is featured in Tommy Finke's song "Poet der Affen/Poet of the Apes," released on the album of the same name in 2010.
- In 2022, Randi made a cameo appearance in the posthumously released online magic special Piff the Magic Dragon: Reptile Dysfunction.
- A character based on Randi named Carmichael Haig appears in the 2023 horror film Late Night with the Devil. Like Randi, Haig is a magician-turned-skeptic who offers a considerable sum of money to anyone who can provide him with convincing proof of the paranormal. Haig is portrayed by Australian actor Ian Bliss.

== See also ==
- List of topics characterized as pseudoscience
- Pigasus Award
