= The Truth About Uri Geller =

1982 book by James Randi

Truth About Uri Geller
- First edition (under original title)
- Author: James Randi
- Publisher: Ballantine Books (1975); Prometheus Books (1982)
- Pages: 241
- ISBN: 0-87975-199-1
- OCLC: 9164994
- Dewey Decimal: 133.8/092/4 19
- LC Class: BF1283.G4 R35 1982

The Truth About Uri Geller, originally published as The Magic of Uri Geller in 1975, is a 1982 book by magician and skeptic James Randi about alleged psychic Uri Geller.

== Contents ==
In the book, Randi challenges Geller's assertions that he performs paranormal feats. Randi explores Geller's background as a stage magician and explains how Geller's spoon bending can be easily reproduced by any magician using sleight of hand.

== Legacy ==
In 1991 Geller filed a $15 million lawsuit against Randi and the Committee for the Scientific Investigation of Claims of the Paranormal (CSICOP) over slander concerning Randi's statements that Geller had "tricked even reputable scientists" with tricks that "are the kind that used to be on the back of cereal boxes when I was a kid". The court dismissed the case and Geller had to eventually settle the case at a cost of $120,000.

In February 1992, Geller sued Randi, Prometheus and local book distributors in London, England, for libel concerning The Magic of Uri Geller. The lawsuit centered on the sentence: "He began his career as a stage magician in Israel where he was once arrested for claiming his feats were performed with psychic power", since Geller had not been arrested but merely sued. The publisher issued an erratum that changed the phrase "he was once arrested" to "he was once sued". Randi commented in 1993 that "My position is that I made an unintended factual error in misinterpreting the words 'brought to court' and 'guilty' as 'arrested,' and that this was done without malice or reckless disregard for the truth." Geller lost this case as well and had to pay Randi's legal fees.

In April 1992, Geller sued Prometheus Books for $4 million, alleging libel in two other books. This suit was thrown out in 1994, and the judge ordered Geller to pay $20,273 in legal fees.

After Geller's three lawsuits, Randi said he "never paid even one dollar or even one cent to anyone who ever sued me, and certainly not to Geller".

== Reception ==
Dave Langford reviewed The Truth About Uri Geller for White Dwarf #43 and stated that "Randi puts the boot into the charismatic Uri. His scorn is withering; even if you think he leans too far towards skepticism (I don't), it's impressive and damning that Randi can duplicate any and all of Geller's paltry tricks without the need to claim astral powers – while Geller's power mysteriously desert him when Randi or other professional magicians happen to be watching."

== See also ==
- Exposure (magic)
