= Spoon bending =

Apparent deformation of objects using magic tricks

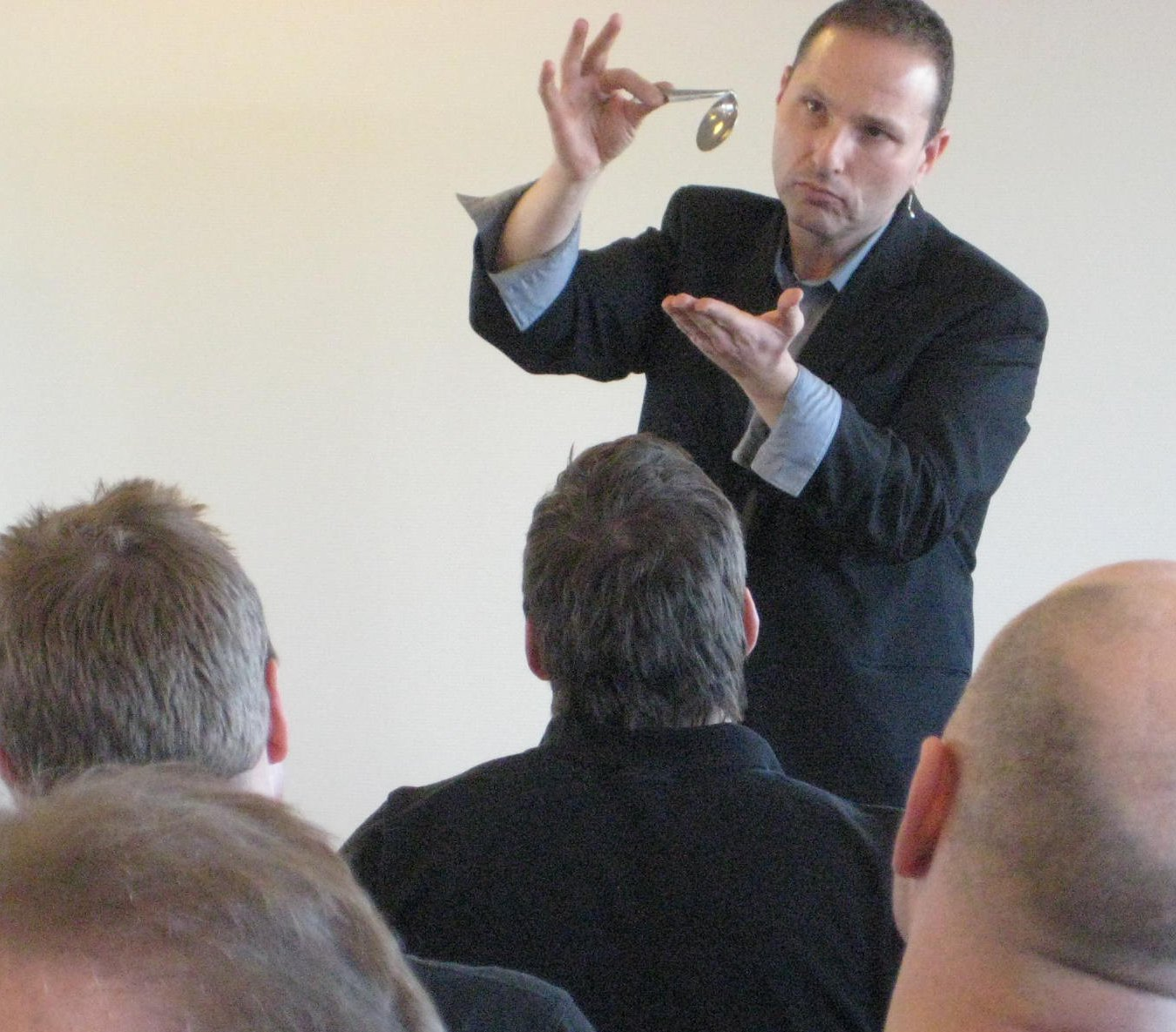
Illusionist Guy Bavli demonstrates spoon bending

Spoon bending is the deformation of objects, especially metal cutlery, purportedly by paranormal means. It is a common theme for magic tricks, which use a variety of methods to produce the effect. Performers commonly use misdirection to draw their audience's attention away while the spoon is manually bent. Another method uses a metal spoon that has been prepared by repeatedly bending the spoon back and forth, weakening the material. Applying light pressure will then cause it to bend or break.

Spoon bending attracted considerable media attention in the 1970s when a number of individuals claimed to have the ability to cause such effects by psychic means. The most famous was Uri Geller, who performed on television bending metal spoons, keys, and other objects. Geller's performances were revealed to be tricks due to the work of magician and investigator James Randi and others.

Despite hundreds of experiments by parapsychologists to determine whether spoon bending is a genuine psychic phenomenon, spoon bending by psychic powers has not been demonstrated to the satisfaction of the scientific community.

== History ==
Spoon bending was popularized in the 1970s by magician and self-described psychic Uri Geller, who claimed to have paranormal powers and appeared on television performing purportedly psychokinetic feats such as causing spoons, nails, and keys to bend using the power of his mind. Geller's actual methods were revealed to be trickery largely due to the work of magician and investigator James Randi.

While many individuals have claimed the paranormal or psychokinetic ability to bend spoons or manipulate other objects, spoon bending by psychic powers has not been demonstrated to the satisfaction of the scientific community. Randi offered a prize of one million dollars to any person who was able to demonstrate paranormal abilities, such as spoon bending.

=== Scientific testing ===
Parapsychologists have conducted hundreds of experiments to determine whether spoon bending is a genuine psychic phenomenon. Physicist John Hasted believed that children could paranormally bend paper clips inside a glass sphere, provided the sphere had a hole in it and they were allowed to take the sphere into a room unobserved. Science writer and skeptic Martin Gardner wrote that Hasted was incapable of devising simple controls such as videotaping the children secretly. Stephen North, a British psychic, was tested by Hasted in the late 1970s. Hasted claimed North had the psychokinetic ability to bend spoons and teleport objects in and out of sealed containers. According to James Randi, during a test conducted by Hasted at Birkbeck College, North was observed to have bent a metal sample with his bare hands. North was tested in Grenoble on 19 December 1977 in scientific conditions and the results were negative.

Jean-Pierre Girard, a French psychic, has claimed he can bend metal bars by psychokinesis. Girard was tested in the 1970s but failed to produce any paranormal effects in scientifically controlled conditions. He was tested on January 19, 1977 during a two-hour experiment in a Paris laboratory. The experiment was directed by physicist Yves Farge with a magician also present. All of the experiments were negative as Girard failed to make any of the objects move paranormally. He failed two tests in Grenoble in June 1977 with Randi. He was also tested on September 24, 1977 at a laboratory at the Nuclear Research Centre. Girard failed to bend any bars or change the structure of the metals. Other experiments into spoon bending were also negative and witnesses described his feats as fraudulent. Girard later admitted that he would sometimes cheat to avoid disappointing the public but insisted he still had genuine psychic power. Magicians and scientists have written that he produced all his alleged psychokinetic feats through fraudulent means.

Between 1979 and 1981, the McDonnell Laboratory for Psychical Research at Washington University reported a series of experiments they named Project Alpha, in which two teenaged male subjects had demonstrated psychokinesis phenomena, including metal-bending and causing images to appear on film, under less than stringent laboratory conditions. Randi eventually revealed that the subjects were two of his associates, amateur conjurers Steve Shaw and Michael Edwards. The pair had created the effects by standard trickery, but the researchers, being unfamiliar with magic techniques, interpreted them as proof of psychokinesis.

John Taylor had tested children in metal bending. According to Gardner, the controls were inadequate as the children would put paper clips in their pockets and later take one out twisted or be left with metal rods unobserved. Randi managed to bend an aluminum bar when Taylor was not looking and scratch on it "Bent by Randi". In other experiments, two scientists from the University of Bath examined metal bending with children in a room which was secretly being videotaped through a one-way mirror. The film revealed that the children bent the objects with their hands and feet. Due to the evidence of trickery, Taylor concluded metal bending had no paranormal basis.

In an experimental study (Wiseman and Greening, 2005) two groups of participants were shown a videotape in which a fake psychic placed a bent key on a table. Participants in the first group heard the fake psychic suggest that the key was continuing to bend when it had remained stationary, while those in the second group did not. The results revealed that participants from the first group reported significantly more movement of the key than the second group. The findings were replicated in another study. The experiments had demonstrated that "testimony for PKMB [psychokinetic metal bending] after effects can be created by verbal suggestion, and therefore the testimony from individuals who have observed allegedly genuine demonstrations of such effects should not be seen as strong evidence in support of the paranormal".

== Methods ==
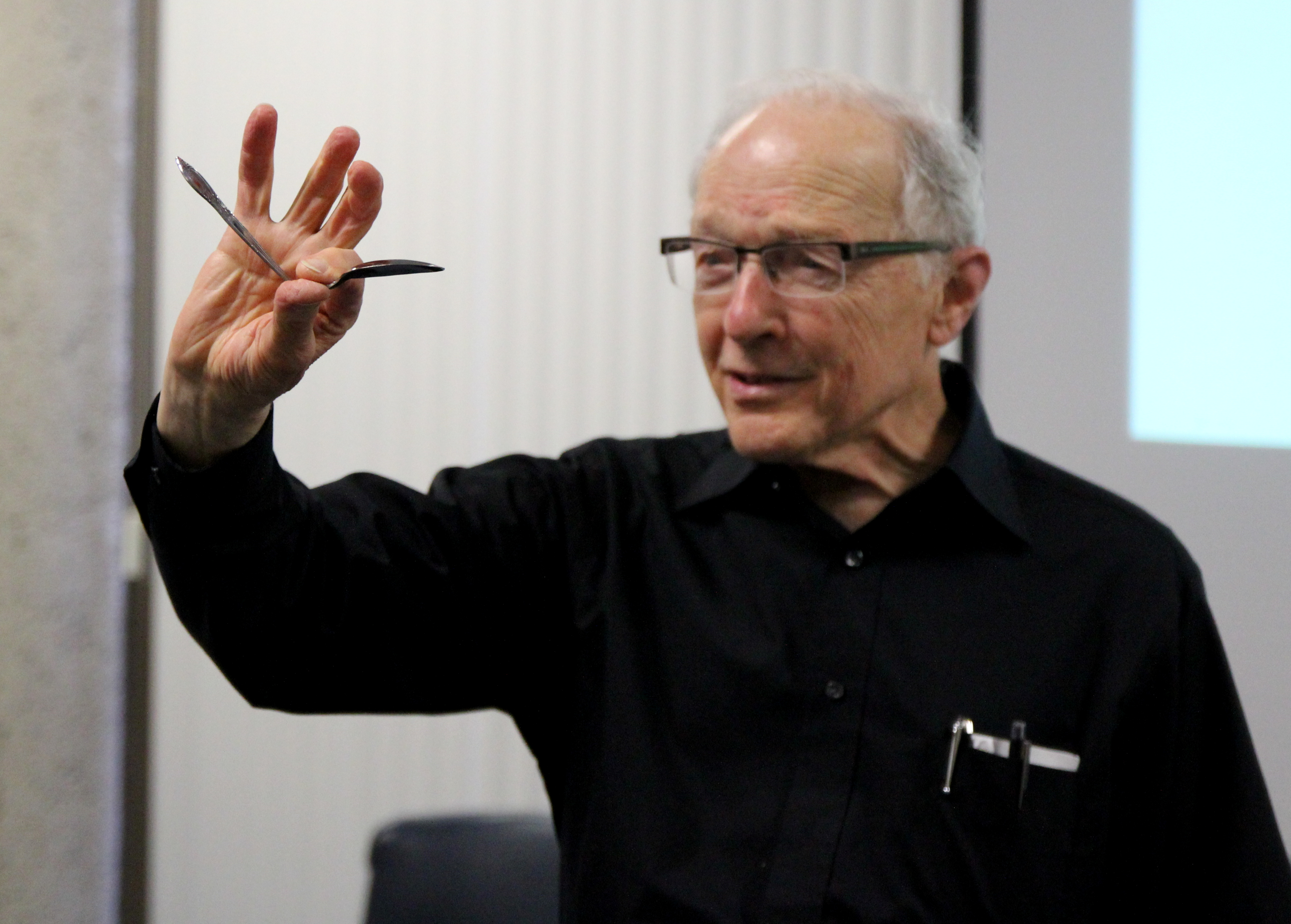
Psychologist Ray Hyman demonstrating Geller's spoon bending feats at a Center for Inquiry lecture in 2012

Stage magicians use several methods of creating the illusion of a spoon bending spontaneously. Most common is the practice of misdirection, an underlying principle of many stage magic tricks; the performer draws the audience's attention away from the spoon for the brief moment during which the spoon is manually bent. The magician then gradually reveals the bend. At a 1998 Skeptics Society conference, investigator James Randi showed clips of Geller appearing on the Italian television channel Rai 3 and the BBC programme Noel's House Party, in which he apparently manually bent various metal objects before displaying them to his audience.

When a spoon is physically bent or broken, it is usually at the point where the object would be easiest to bend by hand. The typical bend, where the bowl meets the handle, requires relatively little force. Another method uses a metal spoon that has been prepared by repeatedly bending the spoon back and forth, weakening the material. Applying light pressure will then cause it to bend or break. The magician then holds together the two halves of the spoon as if it were unbroken, then slowly relaxes their grip, making the spoon appear to bend before splitting in two.

If a magician has control over the viewing angle, the trick can be done by using a spoon that is already bent at the start of the trick. The spoon is initially held with the bend along the viewing angle, making it invisible. The magician then turns the spoon slowly to reveal the bend. The magician Ben Harris published step-by-step photographs and text showing how to bend keys and cutlery by trick methods. Some novelty or magic shops sell self-bending spoons (utilizing the physical properties of a shape-memory alloy) which can be used by amateur and stage magicians to demonstrate "psychic" powers or as a practical joke. Such "self-bending" spoons will bend themselves when used to stir tea, coffee, or any other warm liquid, or even when warmed by body heat. Simply holding a spoon by its neck and rapidly whirling it back and forth can also create the illusion that the spoon is bending, due to the way that the human eye perceives the rocking motion.

== See also ==
- Bent Spoon Award
