= Avon Lake High School =

Location
- 175 Avon Belden Road; Avon Lake, Ohio 44012; United States; 41°30′31″N 82°1′4″W

Information
- Type: Public, Coeducational
- Established: September 1923
- School district: Avon Lake City School District
- Principal: Adam Slabodnick
- Teaching staff: 64.12 (FTE)
- Grades: 9–12
- Enrollment: 1,069 (2023–2024)
- Student to teacher ratio: 16.67
- Campus size: 13 acres
- Campus type: Suburban
- Colors: Maroon and gold
- Athletics conference: Southwestern Conference
- Mascot: Shorty the Shoreman
- Nickname: Shoremen and Shoregals
- Rivals: Avon High School
- Accreditation: Ohio Department of Education
- National ranking: 952
- Newspaper: The Spectrum
- Yearbook: Shore Log
- Website: avonlakecityschools.org/highschool

Avon Lake High School (ALHS) is a public high school located in Avon Lake, Ohio, west of Cleveland. It serves grades 9–12. It is part of the Avon Lake City School District.

== Academics ==
ALHS achieved "excellent" ratings on the Ohio State Report Card every year from 2003 to 2012. Reflecting the new statewide scoring, ALHS has consistently earned "A" grades for achievement (performance index and indicators met) and graduation rate since 2013. As of 2016, ALHS is ranked 261st by Newsweek Magazine and as of 2018, 668th by U.S. News & World Report. Avon Lake High School was ranked 170th in the nation by Newsweek Magazine in 2015. In 2011, Avon Lake City Schools were also recognized by Workplace Dynamics and the Cleveland Plain Dealer as the 8th best among "Northeast Ohio Top Workplaces" in the large companies category (companies with 500 or more local employees).

== Athletics ==
Avon Lake has been part of the Southwestern Conference (SWC) since 1964. As well as having involvement in the vex robotics vrc program since 2017.

=== State championships ===
- Football - 2003
- Girls cross country - 1986, 1988
- Girls basketball - 1994

==== Other non-sanctioned sports ====
- Rugby (club) - 2015, 2019, 2021

== Notable alumni ==
- Tom Batiuk, comic strip creator, best known for his long-running newspaper strip Funky Winkerbean
- Larry Cox, former executive director of Amnesty International
- Carmella DeCesare, Playboy Playmate
- Anne E. DeChant, singer/songwriter/guitarist
- Angela Funovits, mentalist/illusionist and runner-up on NBC's Phenomenon
- Jeremy Griffiths, Major League Baseball pitcher
- Matt Lundy, former member of the Ohio House of Representatives
- Brian Mihalik, National Football League offensive tackle
- Andy Schillinger, National Football League wide receiver
- Dick Tomanek, Major League Baseball pitcher
- Stephen Tompkins, artist, animator, and composer
- Daryl Urig, illustrator and painter
