= McCambridge =

McCambridge or MacCambridge is a Gaelic surname of Kintyre origin. From there the name spread to Antrim as early as the 17th century. The Irish version Mac Ambróis, "son of Ambrose", was first suggested by Eoin Mac Néill but he qualified it with a question mark. An alternative derivation may be from the more common Mac Anndrais. Notable people with the surname include:

- Gerry McCambridge, American magician
- Jimmy McCambridge (1905–1988), Northern Irish footballer
- John McCambridge (c1793–1873), Antrim Gaelic scholar
- John McCambridge (born 1944), American football player and player of Canadian football
- Keith McCambridge (born 1974), Canadian ice hockey player and coach
- Maria McCambridge (born 1975), Irish long-distance runner
- Mercedes McCambridge (1916–2004), American actor
- Michael MacCambridge (born June 1963), American author, journalist and TV commentator
