= Eran Raven =

Israeli mentalist (born 1974)

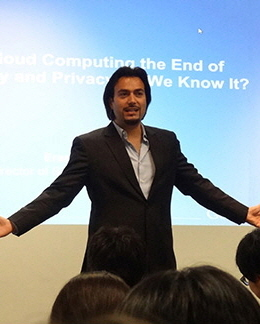
- Eran Raven in Seoul, South Korea, on April 4, 2013
- Born: Eran Feigenbaum; March 3, 1974 (age 51); Tel Aviv, Israel
- Occupations: Mentalist and Security Expert
- Website: http://www.EranRaven.com

Eran Raven is a mentalist and information security professional. He has done mentalism performances on the NBC TV show Phenomenon. In his technology work, under his birth name, Eran Feigenbaum, he was the former director of security at Google Enterprise (2007-2016) and the former chief information security officer for Jet.com.

== Mentalism ==
In October and November 2007, Raven was one of ten mentalist contestants on the primetime NBC series Phenomenon, which was hosted by Tim Vincent and judged by Criss Angel and Uri Geller. He finished as runner-up on the series, after performing dangerous demonstrations of mentalism involving razor blades, snakes, scorpions, and nail guns.

== Information security ==
As Eran Feigenbaum, he worked at Google as head of security for Google Enterprise, and gave multiple presentations before technical audiences and members of Congress. He has written security whitepapers with ex-Google CIO Douglas Merrill.
