= Avon Lake Power Plant =

Power station in Avon Lake, Ohio

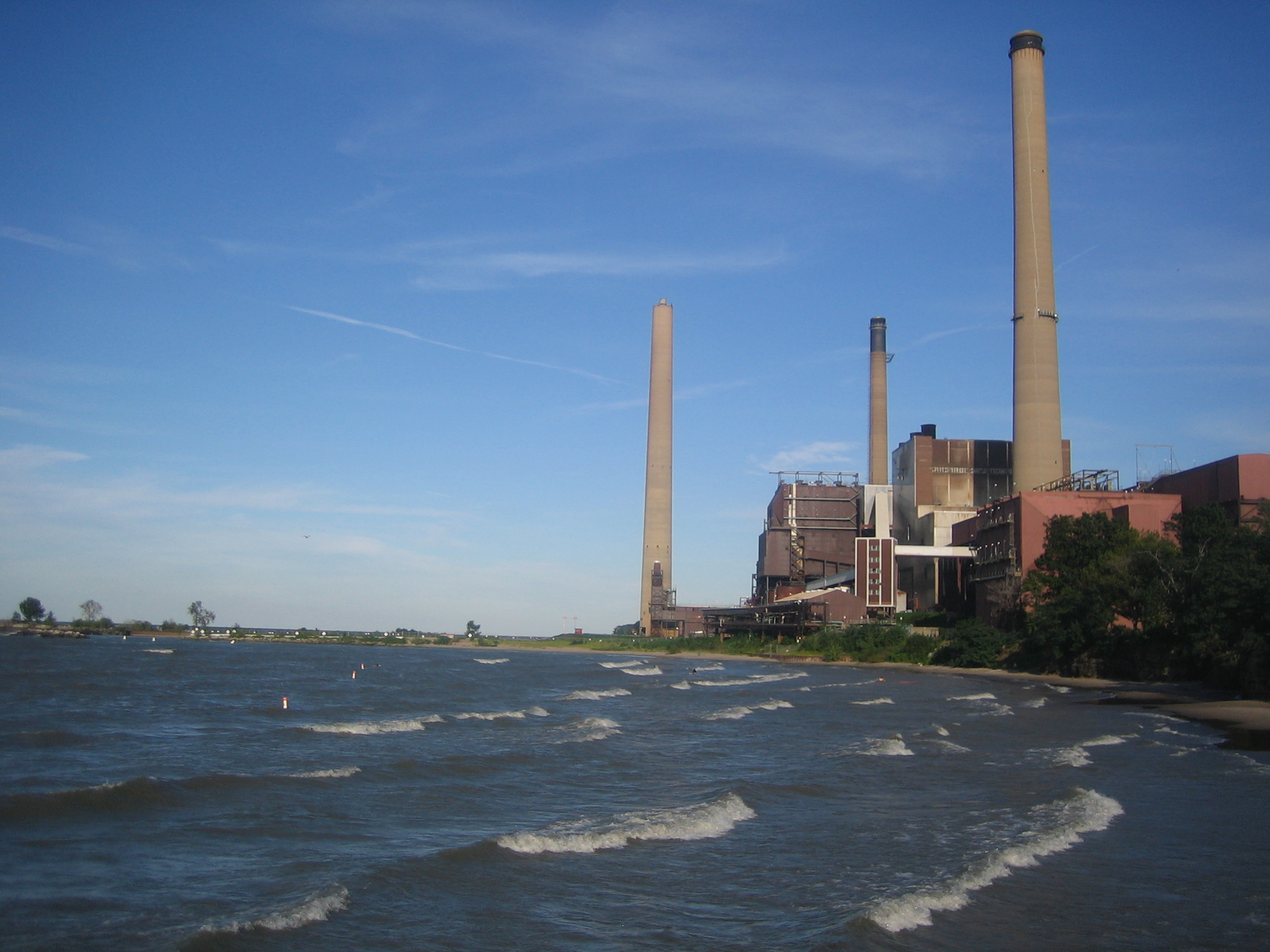
- The Plant as it appeared in 2005
- Country: United States
- Location: Avon Lake, Ohio
- Coordinates: 41.505395°N 82.054309°W
- Status: Decommissioned
- Construction began: March 1925
- Commission date: July 1925
- Decommission date: April 2022
- Construction cost: $30,000,000
- Owner: GenOn Energy Holdings
- Employees: 300 (peak); 55 (2021)

Power generation
- Units operational: 2 (2015)
- Nameplate capacity: 652 MW (2017)
- Capacity factor: 13.1% (2017 to 2019)
- Annual net output: 3,048,000 MWh (2007); 748,000 MWh (2017 to 2019)

The Avon Lake Power Plant was a coal-fired power plant located in Avon Lake, Ohio.

== History ==
The Avon Lake Power Plant was built in July 1926 at a cost of $30 million. At the time, it was one of the largest coal-powered plants in the world. The plant used water from Lake Erie to condense steam that left the turbines. To function, the plant pumped twice as much water as the city water works. By 1950, the plant was burning 4,000 tons of coal per day.

After pressure from the Environmental Protection Agency in the 2010s, the owners agreed to shut down the plant. The last unit was decommissioned on April 1, 2022. The plant was demolished over the course of the next few years with the final remnants being imploded in December 2024. As of 2025, Avon Lake city officials intend to turn the area into a public park.

== Environmental impact ==
A 2009 report by Environment America found that the Avon Lake Power Plant emitted nearly 3,000,000 tons of carbon dioxide, while generating 3,000,000 MWh of electricity.
