= Angela Funovits =

American magician, mentalist, and physician

- Born: July 29, 1987 (age 38); Avon Lake, Ohio
- Website: www.angelafunovits.com

Angela Funovits (born July 29, 1987) is an American magician, mentalist, and dermatologist. She has made television appearances in the United States and elsewhere.

== Biography ==
Funovits was born and raised in Avon Lake, Ohio. She became interested in magic at the age of 10 after watching Breaking the Magician's Code: Magic's Biggest Secrets Finally Revealed, a Fox Network TV program that revealed the secrets of magicians. Funovits began modeling at age 11 after being scouted by an agent from Elite Model Management and at age 16 she won the Miss Teen Cleveland pageant.

She graduated from Avon Lake High School in 2005 and entered the combined B.S./M.D. program at the Northeastern Ohio Universities College of Medicine, later forming a program where magicians teach magic tricks to children at a cancer support center in Cleveland. Funovits graduated from Northeast Ohio Medical University in the spring of 2013 and completed her dermatology residency at Case Western Reserve University/MetroHealth Medical Center in Cleveland, Ohio where she served as academic chief resident and was named recipient of the American Academy of Dermatology's Presidential Citation Award. She went on to work as a dermatologist at Allied Dermatology and Skin Surgery, and continues to run a production company, Seraphim One, that she founded in 2006.

== Appearances ==
- In October and November 2007, Funovits was the only female of ten mentalist contestants on the primetime NBC series Phenomenon, which was hosted by Tim Vincent and judged by Criss Angel and Uri Geller. She finished as first runner-up on the series.
- Funovits represented the US in the live German TV special Die besten Mentalisten der Welt on ProSieben. The special was an addition to the German series The Next Uri Geller - Unglaubliche Phänomene live. It featured Funovits (USA), Vincent Raven (Switzerland), Aaron Crow (Netherlands), and Lior Suchard (Israel).
- W-1, a Japanese TV special on the Fuji Television Network alongside Japanese magician Mr. Maric.
- Funovits was one of the four expert magician "Wizards" on the SyFy series Wizard Wars.
- Featured guest on NPR's All Things Considered with Arun Rath.
- Featured performer on Penn & Teller: Fool Us on the CW network.
- Featured performer on Masters of Illusion on the CW Network.
- Featured performer on Don't Blink with guest Matthew Moy, POPTV network.
- Featured guest judge and performer on The Next Mentalist with Deddy Corbuzier on Indonesia's Trans7 network.
- Featured guest on Indonesia's Hitam Putih.
- Emcee and performer for the American Academy of Dermatology's 2017 President's Gala.
- Featured guest on Germany's Johannes B. Kerner Show
- Featured guest on the late-night syndicated radio talk show Coast to Coast AM, which often discusses topics of the paranormal.
- In 2010 she was a presenter at Moses Znaimer's ideaCity in Toronto, Ontario.
- Featured performer on La Soirée de l'étrange on France's TF1 television network
- Featured performer at The Magic Castle in Hollywood.
- Headlining performer at the Grand Sierra Resort & Casino in Reno, Nevada.
- Headlining performer at the United States Military Academy at West Point.
- In her second year of medical school, Funovits produced two fundraiser shows benefiting the American Cancer Society and the Player's Guild Theatre in Canton, Ohio.
