= Stephen Tompkins =

American artist and animator

Stephen Tompkins (born October 4, 1971, in Cleveland, Ohio) is an American artist, animator, and composer based in Southern California. He grew up in Avon Lake, Ohio, near Cleveland, and graduated from Avon Lake High School in 1990. His work is associated with the 'Hardcore' Pop Surrealism movement

Tompkins' work has been exhibited in numerous galleries throughout the United States and Europe since 1997. His work was exhibited in BLK/MRKT Gallery's Artist Annual in 2007.

His work has been exhibited alongside such artists as Daniel Johnston (in Austin, Texas) in a two-man exhibit titled "The Art of Daniel Johnston and Stephen Tompkins" and Ron English and Steven Hopwood-Lewis ("Melodic Inversions & Contrary Motions" exhibition in Dallas).

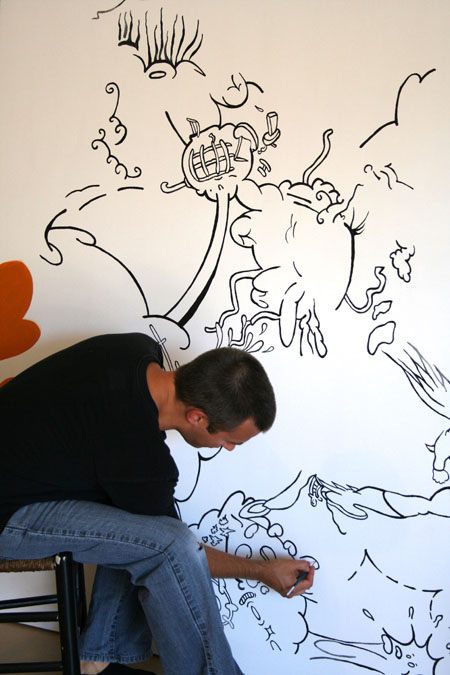
Stephen Tompkins in his studio

His work has appeared in publications including LA Weekly, Raw Vision Magazine, Monopol Magazin, New American Paintings and Juxtapoz. Some of his work was published in the book BLK/MRKT TWO by Die Gestalten Verlag and in Year One Rewind, a survey of urban and graffiti art by Last Gasp Press.

His animated short, Gummymorph, appears in the film Freak Out in Cucamonga, a documentary about the early studio years of Frank Zappa. In February 2009, he released a Digital-8 collection of 13 music videos that he directed, filmed and produced of Daniel Johnston filmed in Johnston's hometown of Waller, Texas. The videos and MP3s were released as digital downloads under the name "Daniel Johnston at Home LIVE".

He acted as an EMT in the Werner Herzog film My Son, My Son, What Have Ye Done.

In December 2009, he was nominated as a composer for a Maverick Movie Award in the short film category for "Best Original Score".

Tompkins was nominated for the 2010 San Diego Art Prize Award by curator Robin Clark, PhD of the Museum of Contemporary Art San Diego and his work was selected to be part of the MCASD exhibit "Here Not There" which opened in June 2010.

He is currently represented worldwide by Ernst Hilger Galerie in Vienna, Austria.
