= Avon Lake, Ohio =

- City
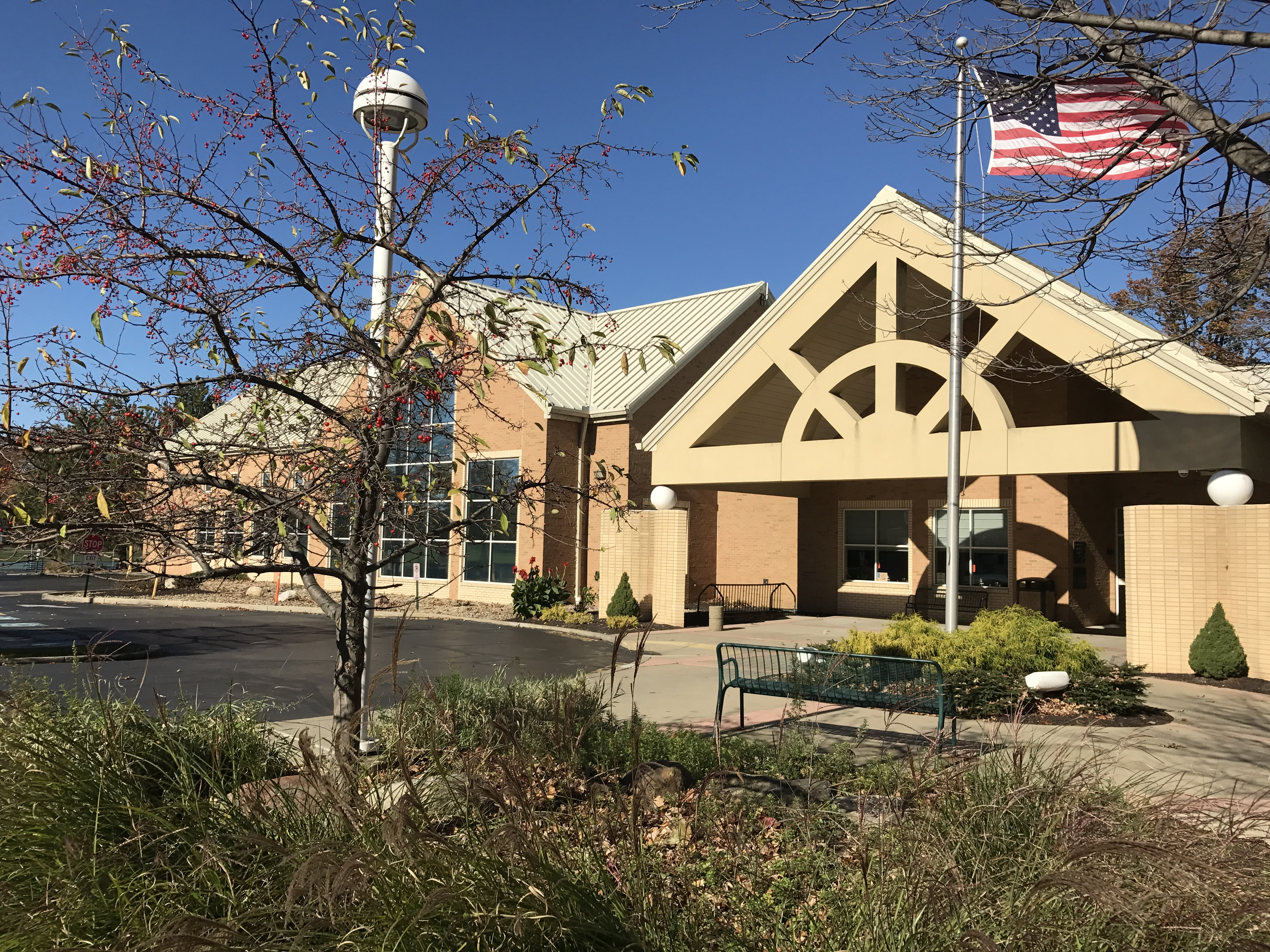
- Avon Lake Public Library

- Flag Seal

- Location of Avon Lake in Greater Cleveland

- Location in Ohio Avon Lake (the United States) Avon Lake (North America)
- Coordinates: 41°30′06″N 82°00′23″W
- Country: United States
- State: Ohio
- County: Lorain
- Avon on the lake: 1819
- Avon Lake Township: 1912
- Avon Lake City: 1960

Government
  - Mayor: Mark A. Spaetzel
  - Council President: Geoffrey R. Smith

Area
  - Total: 11.13 sq mi (28.83 km^{2})
  - Land: 11.13 sq mi (28.83 km^{2})
  - Water: 0 sq mi (0.00 km^{2}) 0%
- Elevation: 623 ft (190 m)

Population (2020)
  - Total: 25,206
  - Estimate (2023): 25,942
  - Density: 2,264.8/sq mi (874.44/km^{2})
- Time zone: UTC-5 (EST)
  - Summer (DST): UTC-4 (EDT)
- Zip code: 44012
- Area code: 440
- FIPS code: 39-03464
- GNIS feature ID: 1086501
- Website: https://www.avonlake.org/

Avon Lake is a city in northeastern Lorain County, Ohio, United States, located on the southern shore of Lake Erie about 17 miles (27 km) west of Cleveland. The population was 25,206 at the 2020 census. It is part of the Cleveland metropolitan area.

== History ==
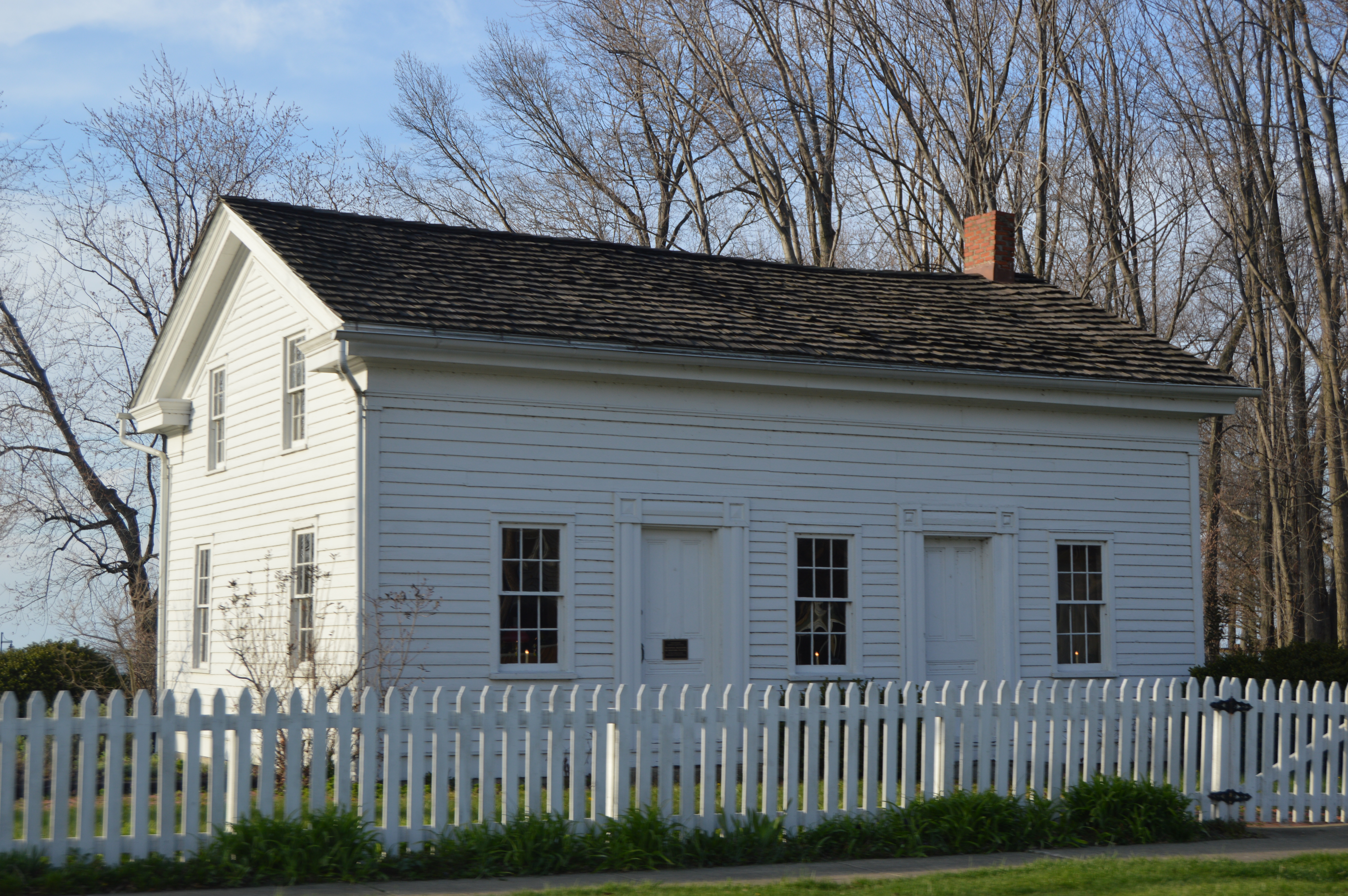
Peter Miller House, built in 1830

Avon Lake was first settled in the 17th century and was, along with Avon, Bay Village, and Westlake, inhabited by the Erie. After the war with the Iroquois in 1656 ended the people were largely dispersed or integrated into Iroquois society. The area was then sparsely populated until the Lenape and Wyandot migrated into the area in 1700. The first European settlement in the area was founded in 1786 by Moravian missionaries. The Northwest Indian War resulted in the Indians in the area giving up all land East of Cuyahoga River in the Treaty of Greenville. Undoubtedly this was the start of European contact with the peoples in Avon Lake, who now found themselves in the Connecticut Western Reserve. Any remaining Indian claims to their land were removed after the 1818 Treaty of St. Mary’s.

Noah Davis, the first lakeshore dweller, arrived in Avon Lake in 1812 and lived in a three-sided cabin near the present-day intersection of Lake and Moore Roads for about a year. Wilbur Cahoon, the owner of the land, encountered Davis and moved farther south (on Davis' advice) in the French Creek precinct where it was not as marshy but more fitting for farming, in 1814. In 1818, Cuyahoga County drew new boundaries, splitting the former entity into two. The west part was Troy Township and the east part was Dover Township. Adam Miller and his family arrived in the following year, and the family has been here ever since. The Millers and others who followed mostly cleared land, sawed timber, and built ships in nearby Black River (eventually renamed Lorain), however Avon Lake's shorelines also had a number of sawmills and shipyards. In 1822, Lorain County was formed. Troy Township was renamed "Avon Township" by petition in 1824.

In 1915, Avon Lake separated from the rest of the Township of Avon to form the Township of Avon Lake. In 1960, Avon Lake was granted the status of a city. Avon Lake became a qualified Tree City USA as recognized by the National Arbor Day Foundation in 1993.

== Geography ==
According to the 2010 census, the city has a total area of 11.13 square miles (28.8 km^{2}), all land.

Avon Lake is located on Lake Erie.

== Demographics ==
Historical population
| Census | Pop. | Note | %± |
|---|---|---|---|
| 1920 | 904 | | — |
| 1930 | 1,610 | | 78.1% |
| 1940 | 2,274 | | 41.2% |
| 1950 | 4,342 | | 90.9% |
| 1960 | 9,403 | | 116.6% |
| 1970 | 12,261 | | 30.4% |
| 1980 | 13,184 | | 7.5% |
| 1990 | 15,066 | | 14.3% |
| 2000 | 18,145 | | 20.4% |
| 2010 | 22,581 | | 24.4% |
| 2020 | 25,206 | | 11.6% |
| 2025 (est.) | 26,486 | | 5.1% |
U.S. Decennial Census

=== 2020 census ===
As of the 2020 census, Avon Lake had a population of 25,206. The median age was 45.0 years. 23.1% of residents were under the age of 18 and 21.3% of residents were 65 years of age or older. For every 100 females there were 92.9 males, and for every 100 females age 18 and over there were 89.7 males age 18 and over.

100.0% of residents lived in urban areas, while 0% lived in rural areas.

There were 10,255 households in Avon Lake, of which 30.5% had children under the age of 18 living in them. Of all households, 57.5% were married-couple households, 13.1% were households with a male householder and no spouse or partner present, and 24.7% were households with a female householder and no spouse or partner present. About 27.4% of all households were made up of individuals and 14.8% had someone living alone who was 65 years of age or older.

There were 10,705 housing units, of which 4.2% were vacant. Among occupied housing units, 79.8% were owner-occupied and 20.2% were renter-occupied. The homeowner vacancy rate was 0.7% and the rental vacancy rate was 6.4%.

Racial composition as of the 2020 census
| Race | Number | Percent |
|---|---|---|
| White | 22,837 | 90.6% |
| Black or African American | 288 | 1.1% |
| American Indian and Alaska Native | 40 | 0.2% |
| Asian | 494 | 2.0% |
| Native Hawaiian and Other Pacific Islander | 17 | 0.1% |
| Some other race | 219 | 0.9% |
| Two or more races | 1,311 | 5.2% |
| Hispanic or Latino (of any race) | 920 | 3.6% |

=== 2010 census ===
As of the census of 2010, there were 22,581 people, 8,900 households, and 6,321 families residing in the city. The population density was 2,028.8 inhabitants per square mile (783.3/km^{2}). There were 9,411 housing units at an average density of 845.6 per square mile (326.5/km^{2}).

There were 8,900 households, of which 34.3% had children under the age of 18 living with them, 60.0% were married couples living together, 8.3% had a female householder with no husband present, 2.7% had a male householder with no wife present, and 29.0% were non-families. 25.1% of all households were made up of individuals, and 11.2% had someone living alone who was 65 years of age or older. The average household size was 2.53 and the average family size was 3.05.

The median age in the city was 41.9 years. 26.2% of residents were under the age of 18; 5.2% were between the ages of 18 and 24; 23.3% were from 25 to 44; 30.9% were from 45 to 64; and 14.5% were 65 years of age or older. The gender makeup of the city was 48.3% male and 51.7% female.

Of the city's population over the age of 25, 49.3% hold a bachelor's degree or higher.

=== 2000 census ===
As of the census of 2000, there were 18,145 people, 6,711 households, and 5,133 families residing in the city. The population density was 1,630.0 inhabitants per square mile (629.3/km^{2}). There were 6,934 housing units at an average density of 622.9 per square mile (240.5/km^{2}). The racial makeup of the city was 97.31% White, 0.45% African American, 0.16% Native American, 0.96% Asian, 0.04% Pacific Islander, 0.25% from other races, and 0.83% from two or more races. Hispanic or Latino of any race were 1.25% of the population.

There were 6,711 households, out of which 38.4% had children under the age of 18 living with them, 66.8% were married couples living together, 7.1% had a female householder with no husband present, and 23.5% were non-families. 20.3% of all households were made up of individuals, and 9.0% had someone living alone who was 65 years of age or older. The average household size was 2.70 and the average family size was 3.14.

In the city the population was spread out, with 28.9% under the age of 18, 5.0% from 18 to 24, 29.5% from 25 to 44, 25.0% from 45 to 64, and 11.6% who were 65 years of age or older. The median age was 38 years. For every 100 females, there were 95.5 males. For every 100 females age 18 and over, there were 89.5 males.

The median income for a household in the city was $65,988, and the median income for a family was $76,603 (these figures had risen to $78,703 and $98,309 respectively as of a 2007 estimate). Males had a median income of $57,294 versus $32,458 for females. The per capita income for the city was $32,336. About 3.0% of families and 4.6% of the population were below the poverty line, including 1.3% of those under age 18 and 7.3% of those age 65 or over.

== Economy ==
Avon Lake is host to a number of industrial companies, including facilities for Lubrizol, Ford Motor Company, PolyOne Corporation, Western Enterprises, and Reliant Energy.

== Recreation ==
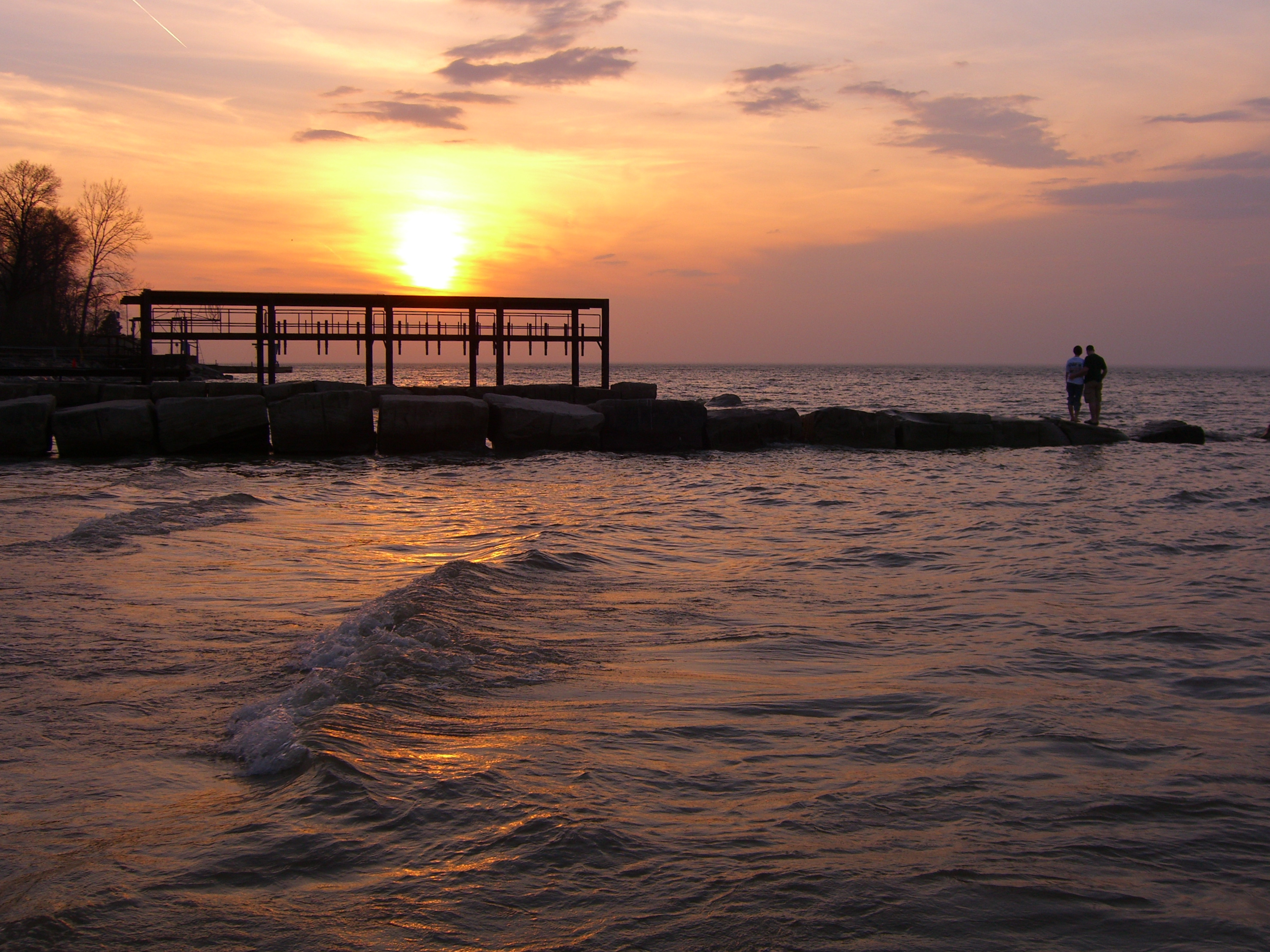
Veterans Park is a popular recreational site in Avon Lake

Approximately 220 acres (0.9 km^{2}) is designated for parks and playgrounds. Avon Lake operates six community parks: Bleser Park, Miller Road Park, Veterans Memorial Park, Weiss Field, Walker Road Park, and Bicentennial Park. Other neighborhood parks managed by the city include Belle Road Park, Inwood Park, Overlook Park, Resatar Park, and Sunset Park, each with adjoining bike trails to promote easy residential access and outdoor recreation. The city also operates the Ellen Trivanovich Aquatic Center, which was rebuilt in 2010. The new facility includes a splash ground, lazy river, regulation lanes, three water slides, and zero-depth entry. The facility is open to residents and guests of residents. The city enforces a curfew, for ages 12 and under: 10:00pm, for ages 13 to 15: 11:00pm, and for ages 16 to 17: 1:00am.

== Education ==
All public schools in the city are a part of Avon Lake City Schools.

There are four public elementary schools:

- Eastview Elementary School (Kindergarten - 4th grade)
- Erieview Elementary School (Kindergarten - 4th grade)
- Redwood Elementary School (Kindergarten - 4th grade)
- Westview Elementary School (Kindergarten - 4th grade)

and three upper-level schools:

- Troy Intermediate School (5th - 6th grade)
- Learwood Middle School (7th - 8th grade)
- Avon Lake High School (9th - 12th grade)

The district was awarded the status of Excellent with Distinction by the Ohio Department of Education for 8 years in a row. In 2015, Avon Lake High School was listed 170th in the country in Newsweek's Top 500 U.S. High Schools with a graduation rate of 100% and a 95.9% college-bound rate.

There is also a Catholic parochial school, St. Joseph's, that offers grades Kindergarten through 8.

=== Library ===
Avon Lake is home to Avon Lake Public Library. The library was first established in January 1931 by a Board of Trustees as appointed by the Avon Lake Village Council and mayor. The opening budget was $1,000 and the first book purchased for the collection was Penrod by Booth Tarkington. Today, the Avon Lake Public Library circulates over 620,000 items with a general fund of $2.9 million.

== Notable people ==
- Sandy Alomar Jr., first base coach and former catcher (Cleveland Indians).
- Tom Batiuk, comic strip creator, best known for his long-running newspaper strip Funky Winkerbean.
- Ed Bettridge, former linebacker for the Cleveland Browns.
- Nathan Brannen, middle distance runner who competed at three Summer Olympics.
- Jock Callander, Hockey Player (1978–2000) for the Pittsburgh Penguins (NHL), Cleveland Lumberjacks (IHL)
- Joe Charboneau, former left fielder for the Cleveland Indians.
- Larry Cox (Amnesty International), former executive director of Amnesty International USA.
- Carmella DeCesare, Playboy Playmate of the Year 2004.
- Anne E. DeChant, singer/songwriter/guitarist.
- Zach D'Orazio, wide receiver for the New England Patriots.
- Angela Funovits, mentalist/illusionist and star of NBC's Phenomenon.
- Matt Ghaffari, wrestler who received a silver medal in the 1996 Summer Olympics.
- Anthony Gonzalez, wide receiver for the Indianapolis Colts, U.S. Representative (R-Ohio, 16th District).
- Jeremy Griffiths, former pitcher for the New York Mets and Houston Astros.
- Travis Hafner, former designated hitter for the Cleveland Indians.
- Tom Hamilton, radio play-by-play announcer for the Cleveland Guardians.
- Žydrūnas Ilgauskas, former center for the Cleveland Cavaliers.
- Jack Kahl, businessman who created the Duck Tape brand.
- Emily Keener, singer and songwriter.
- Bill Lenkaitis, center and guard for the San Diego Chargers and New England Patriots.
- Matt Lundy, former member of the Ohio House of Representatives.
- Brian Mihalik, former offensive tackle for the Detroit Lions and New York Giants.
- Matt Ouimet, former CEO of the Cedar Fair Entertainment Company.
- Andy Schillinger, former wide receiver for the Phoenix Cardinals.
- Michael Symon, chef, restaurateur, television personality, and author.
- Dick Tomanek, former pitcher for the Cleveland Indians.
- Stephen Tompkins, artist, animator, and composer.
- Matt Underwood, television play-by-play announcer for the Cleveland Guardians.
- Daryl Urig, illustrator and painter.
- Chuck Vinci, Olympic Gold Medalist in Weightlifting.
