= Avon Lake City School District =

School district in Ohio, United States

Address
- 175 Avon Belden Road Avon Lake, Ohio, 44012; United States

District information
- Type: Public
- Grades: PK–12
- Schools: 6
- NCES District ID: 3904812

Students and staff
- Students: 3,435 (2025–2026)
- Teachers: 204.62 (on an FTE basis) (2025–2026)
- Staff: 498.59 (on an FTE basis) (2025–2026)
- Student–teacher ratio: 16.79 (2025–2026)

Other information
- Website: www.avonlakecityschools.org

Avon Lake City School District, or Avon Lake City Schools, is the public school district of Avon Lake, Ohio. Avon Lake City Schools serves approximately 3,435 students in grades prekindergarten-12 with 250 teachers. The superintendent of Avon Lake City Schools’ is Joelle Magyar.

== Schools ==
- Avon Lake High School (Grades 9-12)
- Learwood Middle School (Grades 7-8)
- Troy Intermediate School (Grades 5-6)
- Eastview Elementary School (Grades K-4)
- Erieview Elementary School (Grades K-4)
- Redwood Elementary School (Grades K-4)
- Westview Elementary School (Grades K-4)

The Avon Lake City School District also provides busing to students of Saint Joseph Church School (Grades 1-8), though that school is not part of the district.

Avon Lake High School was listed as Number 170 in Newsweek's Top 500 U.S. High Schools in 2015.
