= Mike Super =

American magician

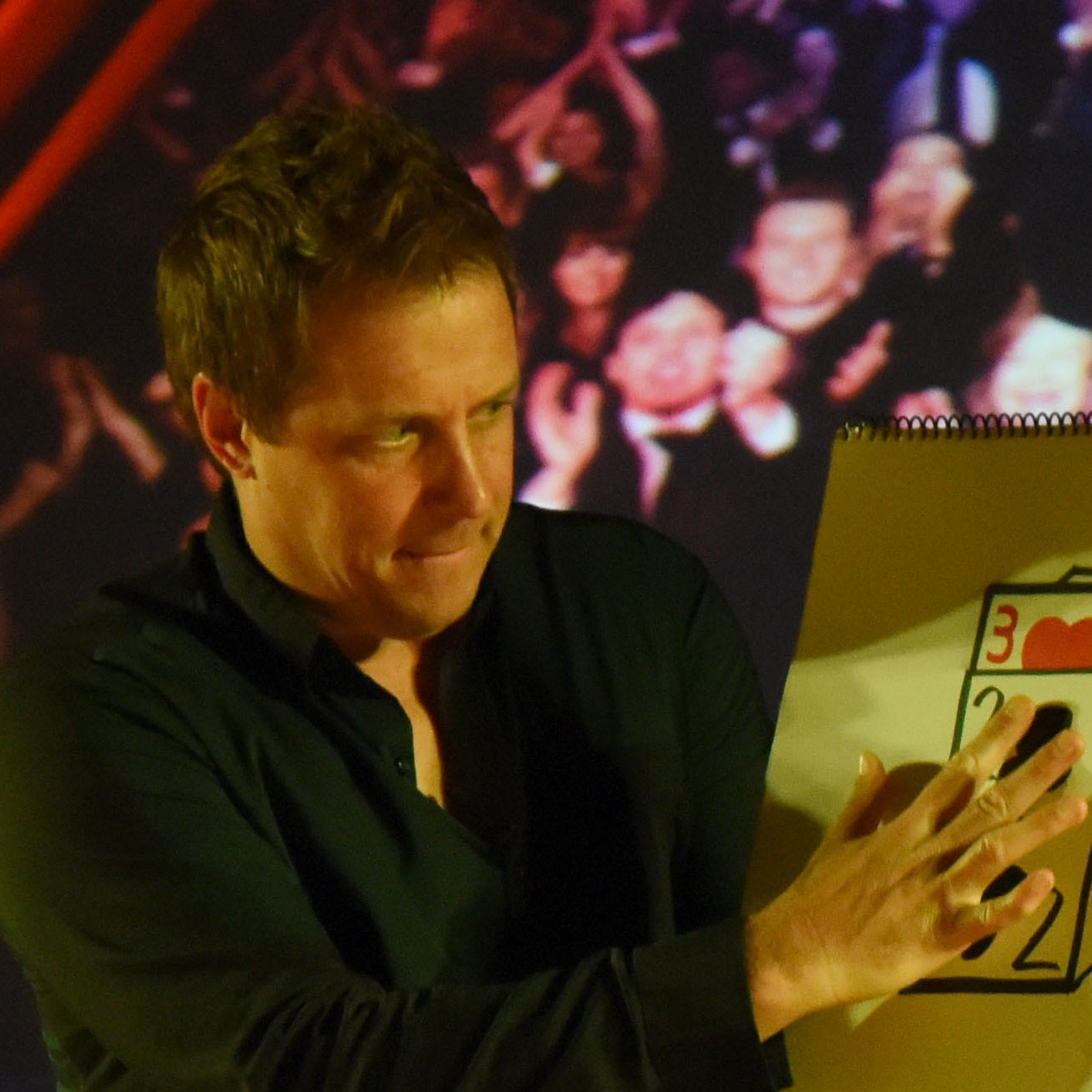
- Super performing in 2017
- Occupations: Mentalist, Magician
- Website: Official website

Mike Super is an American magician who is the winner of the NBC show Phenomenon. He was a top finalist on Season 9 of America's Got Talent. He's also appeared on The Ellen DeGeneres Show and the Penn & Teller: Fool Us series. Super currently tours the U.S. and Canada with his illusion show.

== Biography ==
He idolizes Walt Disney, Harry Houdini, David Copperfield, and Doug Henning. He performed magic to study at the University of Pittsburgh, where he majored in Computer Science.

Super won NBC's TV series Phenomenon, and most recently was a top finalist on the ninth season of America's Got Talent. NBC searched the globe for the 10 best mentalists in the world, and then had them compete on live television. Super was voted the winner by the American public, and won US$250,000 along with the title of "The Phenomenon." He has appeared on three TV specials in France, and he was also chosen to make Ellen DeGeneres appear from shadows for DeGeneres's "Magic Week" feature on her talk show.

Super recently appeared on Penn & Teller: Fool Us where he predicted numbers chosen at random by the audience with a state verified Powerball Ticket played months before.

He regularly performs for Disney and the US Military supporting the troops.

== Awards and honors ==
Super was named Entertainer of the Year by Campus Activities Magazine, along with Best Male Entertainer, Best Performing Artist, and Best Novelty Entertainer of the year. He has also received two Merlin awards from the International Society of Magicians. He was named "America's Favorite Mystifier" on LIVE TV for winning the NBC Show Phenomenon.
