= Anne E. DeChant =

American singer-songwriter

- Origin: Avon Lake, Ohio, United States
- Genres: Folk rock, Americana
- Years active: 1992–present
- Label: Funny Man Music
- Formerly of: Odd Girl Out
- Website: AnneEDeChant.com

Anne E. DeChant is an American rock singer/songwriter/guitarist based in the Cleveland area. Her career began with the band Odd Girl Out in the early 1990s before releasing her first solo project in 1996.

== History ==
DeChant grew up in Avon Lake, Ohio, and graduated from Avon Lake High School in 1983. She attended Miami University.

With Alexis Antes and Victoria Fliegel, Odd Girl Out enjoyed a niche following, particularly on the college scene. The band got airplay on, and support from, commercial radio stations in the Cleveland market, shortly before media deregulation and consolidation made the practice less common.

In July 1997, Anne E. DeChant released her first solo album, with a more mainstream sound, but departing a bit from her folk roots.

== Songwriting ==
DeChant writes her share of heart-felt songs of heartache and heartbreak. She is a story teller who draws much of her inspiration from the struggles of those she observes. Many of her most popular tracks are about social justice issues. Examples include Girls and Airplanes (gender equality), Green Hand (supporting troops post-war), Swastika (Holocaust denial), 25 (imbalance in economic status), and Second Class Citizen and "What Do You Care" (prejudice and intolerance toward the gay and transgender communities), "World War III" (man-made 'progress' versus destruction of the earth). Her 2020 song "Change" relates the disparity in the culture wars, both economic and racial.

Anne E. DeChant is the lead vocal, and plays rhythm guitar and/or ukulele on her recordings, sometimes adding electric guitar and banjo on stage in live performances.

== Album discography ==
- Odd Girl Out: Live in Concert (1990, live CD, with Odd Girl Out)
- Effort of the Spin (1996, CD)
- Something of the Soul (2000, CD)
- Live: An Evening with Anne E. DeChant (2001, live, CD)
- Pop the Star (2004, CD) produced by Don Dixon, Cleveland
- Girls and Airplanes (2006, CD) produced by Andy Ackland, San Diego
- One Voice One Guitar (2007, Christmas CD) produced by Dark Tree Studios, Cleveland
- One Voice One Guitar Vol 2 (2008, CD) produced by Toy Box Studios, Nashville
- Swing (2011, CD) produced by Bill Warner, Nashville
- The Sun Coming In (2015, CD) produced by Mike Severs, Nashville, Sunny's Lab Studios, Nashville TN
- Lost in Kentucky (2018, CD) produced by Mike Severs and Anne E. DeChant at Sunny's Lab Studios, Nashville TN
- Every Little Everything, Greatest Hits, Vol. 1 (2020, CD) new songs produced by Mike Severs, Nashville, Sunny's Lab Studios, Nashville TN

== Awards ==
- Finalist, Kerrville Folk Festival, 2020
- Cleveland Free Times: All Star Musician, 2007
- Cleveland Scene: Best Singer/Songwriter, Best Folk/Acoustic Act, Best Regional Vocalist, various years 1998-2005
- CleveScene.com: 2000 Scene Music Awards
