= Wayne Hoffman =

American mentalist and illusionist

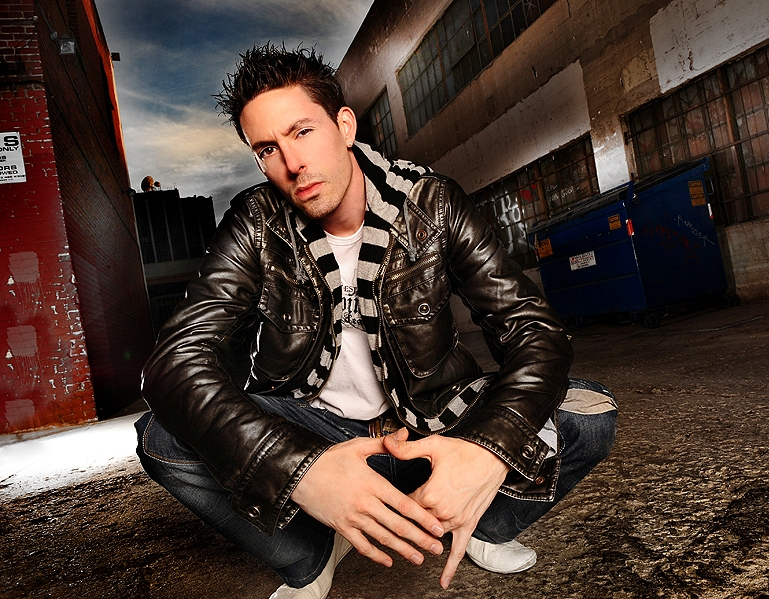
- Wayne Hoffman
- Born: November 20, 1981 (age 44); Reading, Pennsylvania
- Occupations: Mentalist, Magician, Illusionist
- Spouse: Kaitlyn Hoffman
- Children: Kennedy Hoffman, Alexander Hoffman, and Luke Hoffman
- Website: www.waynehoffman.com

Wayne Hoffman (born November 20, 1981) is an American mentalist and illusionist. He has appeared on many international television shows and tours the world with his live show entitled "Mind Candy" and his motivational keynote entitled "The Power and Potential of The Human Mind." He also performs a virtual magic and mind reading show entitled "Distant Deceptions." He appeared on America's Got Talent, season 10 (2015) and also appeared in their TV commercial. He appeared on NBC's television show Phenomenon on October 31, 2007. He was a co-host of The A-List on Discovery's Animal Planet. He was also a guest on CNN's television talk show Glenn Beck on March 25, 2008. He appeared as a guest on The Ellen Degeneres Show on April 13, 2009. On May 4, 2012, he appeared in a short movie entitled "Epic School Battle" with Steven Tyler and Kiss. He also appeared on CBS's Excused on October 30, 2012. He also appeared on Beverly Hills Pawn on June 12, 2013. Wayne Hoffman was also an expert guest on The Numbers Game on The National geographic Channel on March 31, 2014 Wayne successfully fooled Penn & Teller on their show Fool Us on the CW network on August 31, 2016. He subsequently performed onstage with Penn & Teller at the Rio Hotel and casino on September 25, 2016. Wayne also appeared on the show HARRY, hosted by Harry Connick Jr., on October 13, 2017. He also appeared on Takeshi Kitano's "Unbelieveable" on Japan's TV Asahi in December 2013. He was also a guest on Fuji TV's "Anbiribabo" on March 20, 2014

== Early life ==
Wayne Nicholas Hoffman was born in Reading, Pennsylvania. He graduated from Holy Name High School

His father is Frederick Hoffman (born 1936), and his mother is Rose Schober (born 1948). In 1991 Hoffman discovered the Mingus Magic Shop in Reading, Pa and it was there he discovered his passion for the mystery arts. Wayne Hoffman spent his early life visiting the Mingus Magic shop where he studied magic and mentalism. He performed his first paid show at the age of 15 in Reading, Pennsylvania. After graduating from high school he attended Alvernia College (now Alvernia University). Hoffman's childhood interest in magic and mind reading led him to study psychology. He eventually became a professional magician and began performing regionally and then internationally. He is a member of the International Brotherhood of Magicians and a member of the Academy of Magical Arts which opersates The Magic Castle in Hollywood, California.

== Career ==
Hoffman initially focused on traditional magic and illusion before turning his focus to mentalism and psychological entertainment. He performed for various events in the eastern half of the United States before his international success. In the beginning of his career, he performed table-to-table at restaurants in his home town. but he soon began experimenting with mentalism. Throughout high school he would perform for classmates and workers at the school. Later Hoffman began performing for corporations who would pay him to incorporate their sales message into his magic.

Hoffman quickly began performing throughout the United States. In 2003 he began touring the United States as part of a college & university tour. In 2006 he furthered his career by performing for Princess Cruise lines where he was nominated as Entertainer of The Year.

Hoffman's "big break" came in 2007 when he was contacted by NBC. Impressed by his mentalism act, NBC asked him to participate in their television show Phenomenon. The producers were impressed with his apparent ability to change traffic lights with his mind. After his exposure on Phenomenon, he began to get phone calls for appearances on other television shows such as, The Glenn Beck Show, The Ellen DeGeneres Show, and more. Shortly after, Hoffman performed his first international show in England. Hoffman later became known as "The Master of Mayhem."

From 2007 onward, he performed with great success in the United States and beyond. He would appear to read minds, influence audience members' thoughts, and perform feats of psychokinesis. He focused much of his attention on death-defying stunts, which added the possibility of death.

For the majority of his career, he performed his act as a headliner. One of his most notable mentalism feats was performed on Phenomenon (TV series), where he influenced former Miss USA Shandi Finnessey to draw a yin-yang symbol which he had tattooed on his arm one month prior. In 2006 he established Hoffman Entertainment which provides talent management. The business is still in operation as of February 2024.

== TV and Media Appearances ==
Year	Show Title	Network	Role	Notes	Reference
2007	Phenomenon	NBC Universal Television	Self	Multiple Episodes	
2008	The Glenn Beck Show	CNN	Self	n/a	
2008	The A-List	The Discovery Network	Self	Co-host	
2009	The Ellen DeGeneres Show	NBC Universal Television	Self	n/a	
2011	Excused	CBS	Self	n/a	
2012	Epic School Battle	Unknown	Self	co-starring Steven Tyler and KISS	
2013	Beverly Hills Pawn	Reelz	Self	n/a	
2013	Oddities	The Science Channel	Self	n/a	
2013	Unbelievable	TV Asahi (Japan)	Self	with Takeshi Kitano	
2013	Anbiribabo	Fuji TV (Japan)	Self	n/a	
2014	The Numbers Game	National Geographic Channel	Self	n/a	
2015	America's Got Talent	NBC Universal Television	Self	Multiple Episodes	
2015	TODAY	NBC Universal Television	Self	Multiple Episodes	
2016	Now You See It	BBC	Self	n/a	
2016	Penn & Teller: Fool Us	The CW Network	Self	n/a	
2016	The Marilyn Denis Show	Canadian Television (CTV)	Self	n/a	
2017	HARRY	NBC Universal Television	Self	n/a	
2017	Magic Control (마법 제어)	TV Chosun	Self	Multiple Episodes	
2018	Pickler & Ben	CMT	Self	Multiple Episodes	
2018	The Morning Show	Shaw Network	Self	n/a	
2019	Daily Blast Live	Syndicated	Self	Multiple Episodes in 2019, 2020, and 2021	
2021	Go-Big Show	Turner Broadcasting System (TBS)	Self	n/a	
2023	Masters of Illusion	CW Network	Self	Episode 3: Trial by Fire, Quick Change, and the Uncanny air date: November 20, 2023	
2024	Masters of Illusion	CW Network	Self	Episode 8: True Magic, Lollipops, and Blades of Death air date: January 6, 2024	

== In the news ==
On November 23, 2011, Hoffman was featured in a story for CNN Money where he was featured in their story "Cool Companies". The story highlighted 12 "cool and profitable companies." The story was written by Kitt Walsh.

On November 1, 2011, he was quoted in YFS (Young, Fabulous, and Self-employed) Magazine.

On October 5, 2012, Hoffman was featured in a story posted on the CNN Money website. The story was about the Top Ten surprising six-figure jobs. The Story was written by Blake Ellis.

On October 5, 2012, Hoffman was featured in Yahoo! Finance in a story originally posted by CNN Money about the Top 10 surprising six-figure jobs.

On October 8, 2012, Hoffman was featured on the AOL homepage in a story originally posted by CNN Money on the Top 10 surprising six-figure jobs.

== Motivational presentation ==
In 2009, Hoffman began presenting a motivational speech entitled "The Power and Potential of The Human Mind" His first presentation was at the Rio Hotel and Casino in Las Vegas.

== Mind Candy ==
In 2012, Hoffman wrote his first book entitled Mind Candy. The book is a motivational book that teaches people a method to achieve any goal they have. The system taught in the book implements common sense business tactics, as well as positive thinking.

== Hoffman Entertainment ==
In 1996, Hoffman established his entertainment agency, Hoffman Entertainment. The agency books various acts including bands, comedians, speakers, and interactive novelties. Hoffman Entertainment has three offices in the United States. The first office is located in Hollywood, California. The second office is located in Reading, Pennsylvania. The third office is located in Estero, Florida.

== Philanthropy ==
In 2012, Hoffman established his first charitable organization, The Hoffman Foundation. The goal of the organization is to help children from lower-income families experience live theater.

== Near death experience / flight incident ==
On January 30, 2008, Hoffman and his father were on an American Airlines flight from San Juan to Philadelphia. During the flight the plane's cockpit caught on fire. It was later discovered that a fuse in the window's heater blew causing an electrical fire. The plane made an emergency landing at Palm Beach International Airport 90 minutes after the plane's cabin filled with smoke. 7 people were sent to the hospital including the captain and the co-pilot. The co-pilot was treated for cuts he sustained to his face when the plane's windshield shattered.

== Awards and nominations ==
Year	Award	Category	Result	Notes
2006	APCA Awards	Novelty Artist of the Year	Won	n/a
2008	Campus Activities Magazine Awards	Best Live Novelty Artist	Nominated	n/a
2009	Campus Activities Magazine Awards	Entertainer of the Year	Nominated	n/a
2009	Campus Activities Magazine Awards	Best Male Performer	Nominated	n/a
2009	Campus Activities Magazine Awards	Best Live Novelty Artist	Nominated	Second Nomination
2010	Campus Activities Magazine Awards	Entertainer of the Year	Nominated	Second Nomination
2011	CNN Money Top Ten	CNN Top Ten Cool Companies	Won	CNNmoney.com
2012	COCA Awards	Lecture/Variety Artist of the Year	Won	
2012	Princess Cruise Lines	Entertainer of the Year	Nominated	
2014	COCA Awards	Lecture/Variety Artist of the Year	Won	
2016	APCA Awards	Mentalist Of The Year	Won	
2016	Penn & Teller: Fool Us	Winner/Fooler	Won	
2017	COCA Awards	Variety Artist Of The Year	Nominated	
2018	APCA Awards	Mentalist Of The Year	Won	
2019	COCA Awards	Hall Of Fame	Won	
