= Brian Mihalik =

American football player (born 1992)

No. 72, 68
- Position: Offensive tackle

Personal information
- Born: August 21, 1992 (age 34); Avon Lake, Ohio, U.S.
- Listed height: 6 ft 9 in (2.06 m)
- Listed weight: 315 lb (143 kg)

Career information
- High school: Avon Lake
- College: Boston College
- NFL draft: 2015: 7th round, 237th overall pick

Career history
- Philadelphia Eagles (2015)*; Pittsburgh Steelers (2016)*; Detroit Lions (2016)*; Pittsburgh Steelers (2016)*; Detroit Lions (2017); New York Giants (2018)
- * Offseason or practice squad member only

Career NFL statistics
- Games played: 20
- Games started: 2
- Stats at Pro Football Reference

Brian Jeffrey Mihalik (born August 21, 1992) is an American former professional football player who was an offensive tackle in the National Football League (NFL). He played college football for the Boston College Eagles and was selected in the seventh round of the 2015 NFL draft by the Philadelphia Eagles. Mihalik was also a member of the Pittsburgh Steelers, Detroit Lions and New York Giants of the National Football League (NFL).

== College career ==
In his freshman season at Boston College in 2011, Mihalik had six tackles and two pass breakups, playing the last nine games of the season. He played nine games as a sophomore in 2012, registering 22 tackles, 3.5 tackles for loss, and a sack. As a junior in 2013, he recorded 22 tackles, including six for loss and two sacks. In his 2014 senior season, Mihalik tallied 27 tackles, including 4.5 tackles for a loss, and 3.5 sacks.

== Professional career ==
=== Pre-draft ===
Mihalik was projected to go undrafted during the 2015 NFL draft by some analysts. Although he had amazing size and length, many were hampered by his athletic ability, strength, and awareness.

Pre-draft measurables
Height	Weight	40-yard dash	10-yard split	20-yard split	20-yard shuttle	Three-cone drill	Vertical jump	Broad jump	Bench press
6 ft 8 7/8 in (2.05 m)	302 lb (137 kg)	4.89 s	1.70 s	2.76 s	4.37 s	7.23 s	35 1/2 in (0.90 m)	10 ft 2 in (3.10 m)	23 reps
All values from Boston College's Pro Day

=== Philadelphia Eagles ===
Mihalik was selected by the Philadelphia Eagles in the seventh round of the 2015 NFL draft with the 237th overall pick. Mihalik was signed to the practice squad after failing to make the 53-man roster, but was released on September 16.

=== Pittsburgh Steelers (first stint) ===
After being released, Mihalik was signed to a futures contract by the Pittsburgh Steelers on January 20, 2016. Despite spending his collegiate career as a defensive end and having no prior experience, the Steelers chose to move him to offensive tackle. He is similar to Steelers' teammate Alejandro Villanueva, who had success after moving to tackle the year prior. Both players stand at 6 feet 9 inches, played defensive end for the Eagles before being released, had no professional experience as offensive linemen before being switched to tackle by offensive line coach Mike Munchak. On August 12, 2016, Mihalik injured his MCL during the Steeler's preseason opener against the Detroit Lions. He was waived two days later and reached an injury settlement with the Steelers on August 19, 2016.

=== Detroit Lions (first stint) ===
On October 6, 2016, Mihalik was signed by the Lions and was released two days later and was then signed to the practice squad. The Detroit Lions signed him after seeing him during their preseason game against the Pittsburgh Steelers.

=== Pittsburgh Steelers (second stint) ===
October 17, 2016, the Steelers signed Mihalik off the Lions' practice squad. Although he had less than a year of experience as an offensive tackle, injuries to Ryan Harris and Marcus Gilbert led to Mihalik moving to the active roster. Mihalik did not appear in any regular season games during his rookie season.

On September 2, 2017, Mihalik was waived by the Steelers.

=== Detroit Lions (second stint) ===
On September 3, 2017, Mihalik was claimed off waivers by the Lions. He was named the backup left tackle behind Greg Robinson to begin the regular season. Mihalik had his first professional catch on November 6, 2017 on Monday Night Football against the Green Bay Packers when a Matthew Stafford pass was tipped at the line and was hauled in by Mihalik.

On September 2, 2018, Mihalik was waived by the Lions.

=== New York Giants ===
On September 13, 2018, Mihalik was signed to the New York Giants' practice squad. He was promoted to the active roster on October 9, 2018.

On September 1, 2019, Mihalik was released by the Giants.
