= Guy Bavli =

Israeli mentalist and illusionist (born 1971)

- גיא בבלי
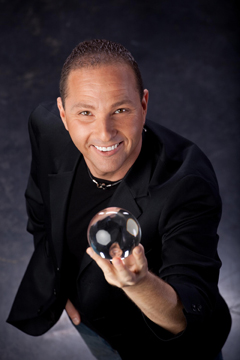
- Born: August 24, 1971 (age 55); Tel Aviv, Israel
- Occupation: CEO: Master of the Mind
- Years active: 1979–present
- Known for: Mentalist, illusionist, lecturer, TV personality
- Website: www.masterofthemind.com

Guy Bavli (Hebrew: גיא בבלי; born 1971) is an Israeli mentalist, illusionist, actor and lecturer. He was the first Israeli citizen to win an international magic competition in the United States. He owns the entertainment company "Master of the Mind", based in Fort Lauderdale, Florida.

== Early life ==
Guy Bavli was born in Tel Aviv, Israel in 1971. He served in the Israel Defense Forces for three years, when he developed a mind reading act and became a member of the Israeli Air Force Performing Group as an actor and singer, In 2002, he moved from Israel to the United States. Bavli became interested in mentalism and illusions as a source of solace from the divorce of his parents and childhood obesity. He was particularly influenced by Uri Geller, Charlie Chaplin, and Roni Shachnaey.

Bavli began performing before audiences at five years of age. When he was eight years old he had his first professional performance at a swimming club in Tel Aviv.

== Career ==
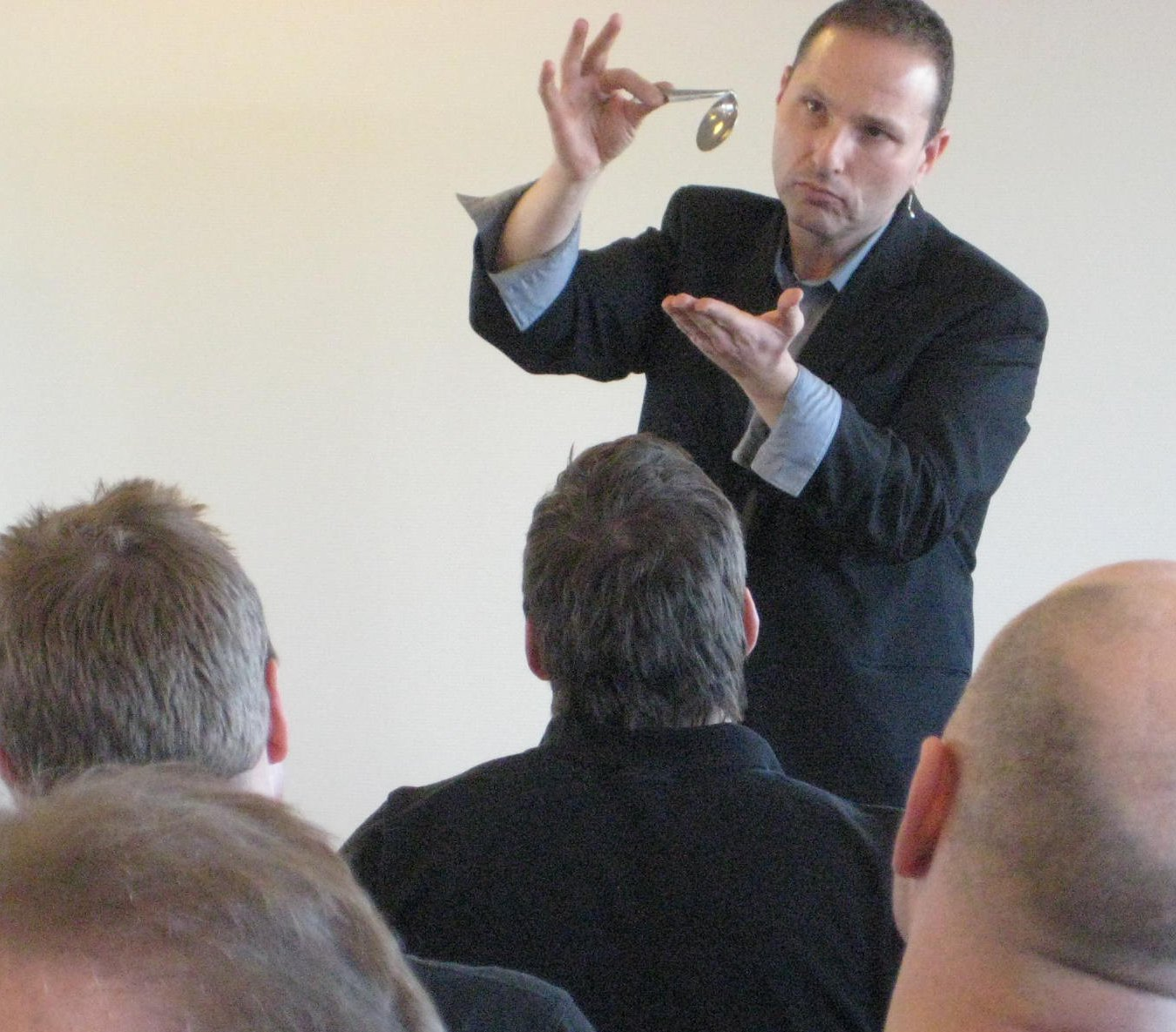
Guy Bavli doing a spoon bending demonstration in Denmark in 2010

In 1996, Guy successfully predicted the outcome of the 1996 Israeli general election on the prime time live television show in Israel, two weeks before the election took place. His predictions were put inside an envelope, which was sealed and signed by the television host Dan Shilon, Mayor of Tel Aviv Roni Milo, and former Mayor of Jerusalem Teddy Kollek. Afterwards, the envelope was locked inside the steel safe until the election results were revealed. He also appeared in a product advertisement for Jaguar, where he was blindfolded and then maneuvered a new Jaguar X-type through an obstacle course in front of a live audience.

Bavli has performed at The Magic Castle in Hollywood, California, Carnegie Hall in New York, and Caesars Palace in Las Vegas. In 2007, Bavli appeared on NBC's television show Phenomenon, where he performed a heart stopping demonstration, a Russian roulette demonstration using 8 jars of hydrochloric acid, and a spoon bending demonstration. In 2011, he appeared in Stan Lee's Superhumans, where he performed his telekinetic demonstration. He also appeared in television shows such as Sábado Gigante with Don Francisco, Patty Show aired on Estrella TV, Dan Shilon's Talk Show, and Korea TV show named "Magic Hole".

== Filmography ==
Year	Film	Role
1990	Ba Li Balon	Magician
1994	Snurre Snups Søndagsklub	As himself
2007	Phenomenon	As himself
2008	Masters of Illusion	As himself
2012	Stan Lee's Superhumans	As himself
2012	Magic Hole Korea	As himself

== Awards ==
In 1986, Bavli was given an award at the Tannen's Magic Camp competition in New York City. In 1988 and 1993, he was ranked first in the category Stage Performer of the Year, and in 1990, he was named magician/performer of the Decade (1980-1990) by the Israeli Society for Promoting the Art of Magic.

In 2000, Guy was named as the best performer at the "National American Broadcast" in Las Vegas, while he was merited for the best show at the International Broadcasting Convention in Amsterdam, representing Dream Team Ltd. in a trade show. In 2007, he took fourth place in TV show Phenomenon.

In 2013, he was awarded Dunninger Memorial Award for his distinguished professionalism in the performance of mentalism, given by Psychic Entertainers Association. The award was previously awarded to mentalists such as Derren Brown (2006), Uri Geller (2010) and Kreskin (2012).

== Personal life ==
Bavli moved from Israel to the United States in 2002. He is married and has two children.
