= Avon Lake Public Library =

Public library in Ohio, United States

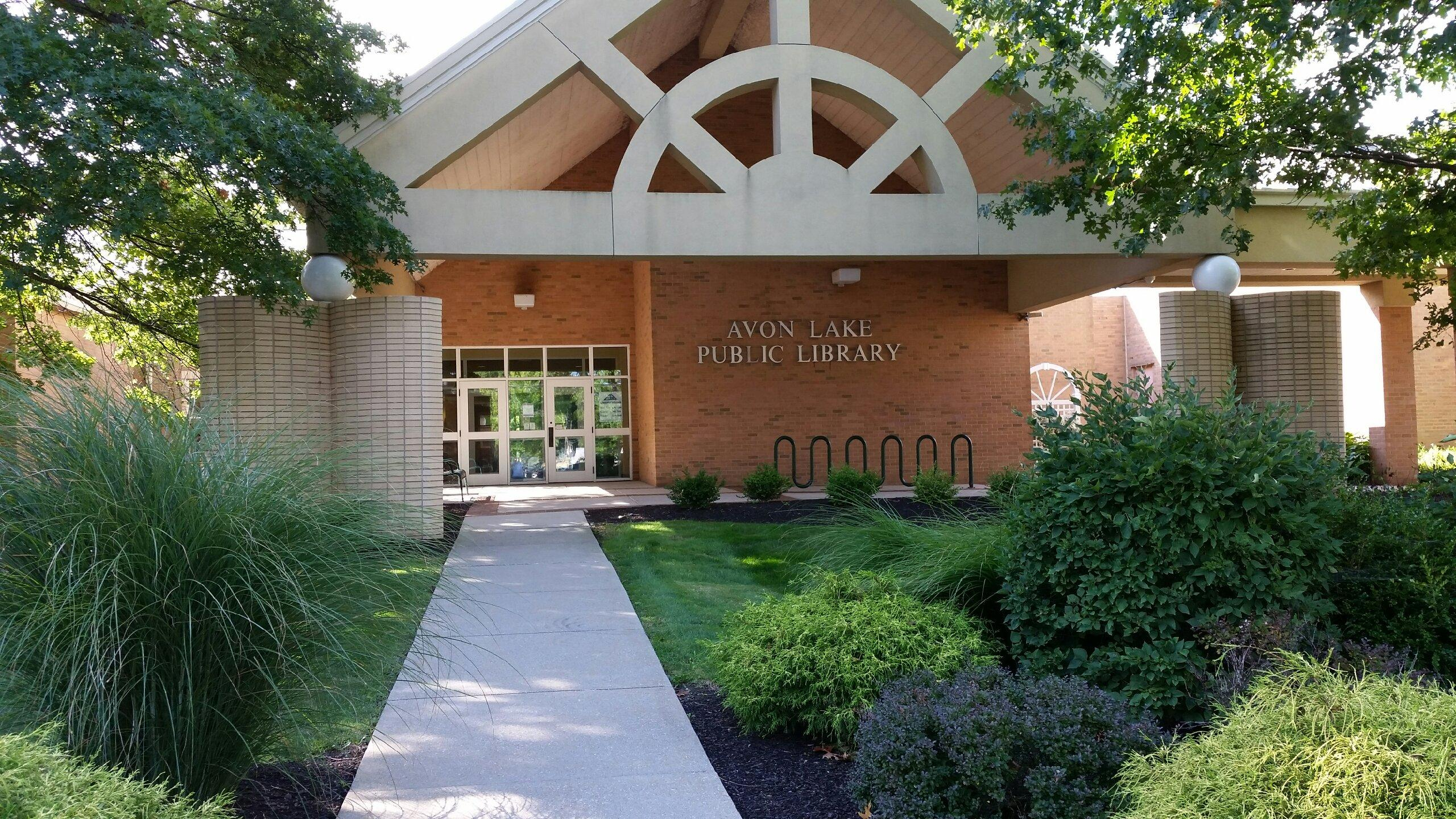
- 41.5098215°N 82.0141539°W
- Location: Avon Lake, Ohio, United States of America
- Type: Public library
- Established: 1930

Access and use
- Circulation: 557,498
- Population served: 23,453
- Members: 27,163

Other information
- Director: William Z. Rutger
- Website: http://www.alpl.org

Avon Lake Public Library is located in Avon Lake, Ohio. In addition to a catalog of materials for children, young adults, and adults, the library offers online resources including Hoopla, OneClickDigital, the Ohio Web Library and the Ohio Digital Library's eBook lending program. The library's services include public access computers, wireless internet access, notary services, test proctoring, and homebound delivery for those who cannot come to the library in person.

Avon Lake Public Library also offers an equipment circulation program that opens opportunities for patrons to access media in old and new formats. Equipment available for loans includes turntables, cassette players, and slide scanners, as well as eReaders, tablets, video game consoles and projectors. The library further provides tips on reducing the costs associated with cable television subscriptions in its "Cutting The Cord" website section.

Programs at the library include genealogy research, craft workshops, book clubs, and gardening instruction, as well as a number of offerings for children and young adults. Of note, the library also offers experiential learning opportunities in its DiscoveryWorks area. DiscoveryWorks includes hands-on exhibits, science-to-go kits, and the Rainwise III weather station that provides local weather information to Weather Underground.

The library's website also provides a special section for teachers who wish to adopt library recommended resources for their lesson plans. The "Parent & Teacher Resources" section offers curated reading lists as well as directions for obtaining Teacher Loan library cards.

== History ==
Avon Lake Public Library opened in a farmhouse on the east side of Center Road in Avon Lake in 1931. In 1957, construction began on a new library building on Electric Boulevard, and the library reopened at its current location on August 11, 1958. Several notable expansion projects have been undertaken, including a 1980-1983 project that doubled the size of the library, and a 1990-1994 project that again expanded it to its current space of 55,000 square feet.

In 2014, the Board of Library Trustees approved a $700,000 renovation of the 1994 addition. The renovation was completed by April 2015, and was celebrated with a reception and open house event.

In 2011, the Library celebrated its 80th anniversary with a commendation from the Ohio House of Representatives and a proclamation from the city of Avon Lake.

== Special Collections ==
Avon Lake Public Library maintains a special collection that includes original materials and reproductions of books, manuscripts, photographs, postcards and correspondence, newspapers and periodicals, films and more documenting Avon Lake city history. While the Avon Lake Local History Collection dates from approximately 1890 to the present, most of the material in the Collection is drawn from the years 1920 to 1990.

Together with Heritage Avon Lake, the library has partnered with the Cleveland Memory Project to create an online collection of historic photographs of Avon Lake history, as well as a repository of digitized documents that includes the archives of the local newspaper as well as high school yearbooks, newspapers and literary annuals.

In 2012, the library announced an Avon Lake Local History Art Collection featuring over 40 items representing the history of the city, the library, Lorain County, Ohio, the Lake Shore Electric Railway and Avon Beach Park Resort, and shipping and shipwrecks on Lake Erie.

== Awards and recognition ==
In 2009 and 2010, Avon Lake Public Library was named one of the Top Ten Public Libraries in the United States in the service category of 10,000 – 24,999 patrons by Hennen's American Public Library Ratings.

== Steak Sauce ==
Starting in January 2017, 30 empty A1 Steak Sauce bottles were found in the library over the course of three months. The bottles have been found in the adult fiction and non-fiction sections of the library. No one has been able to explain their origin or purpose. As of August 2017, 55 cleaned, unlabeled bottles had been found.

== Gallery ==
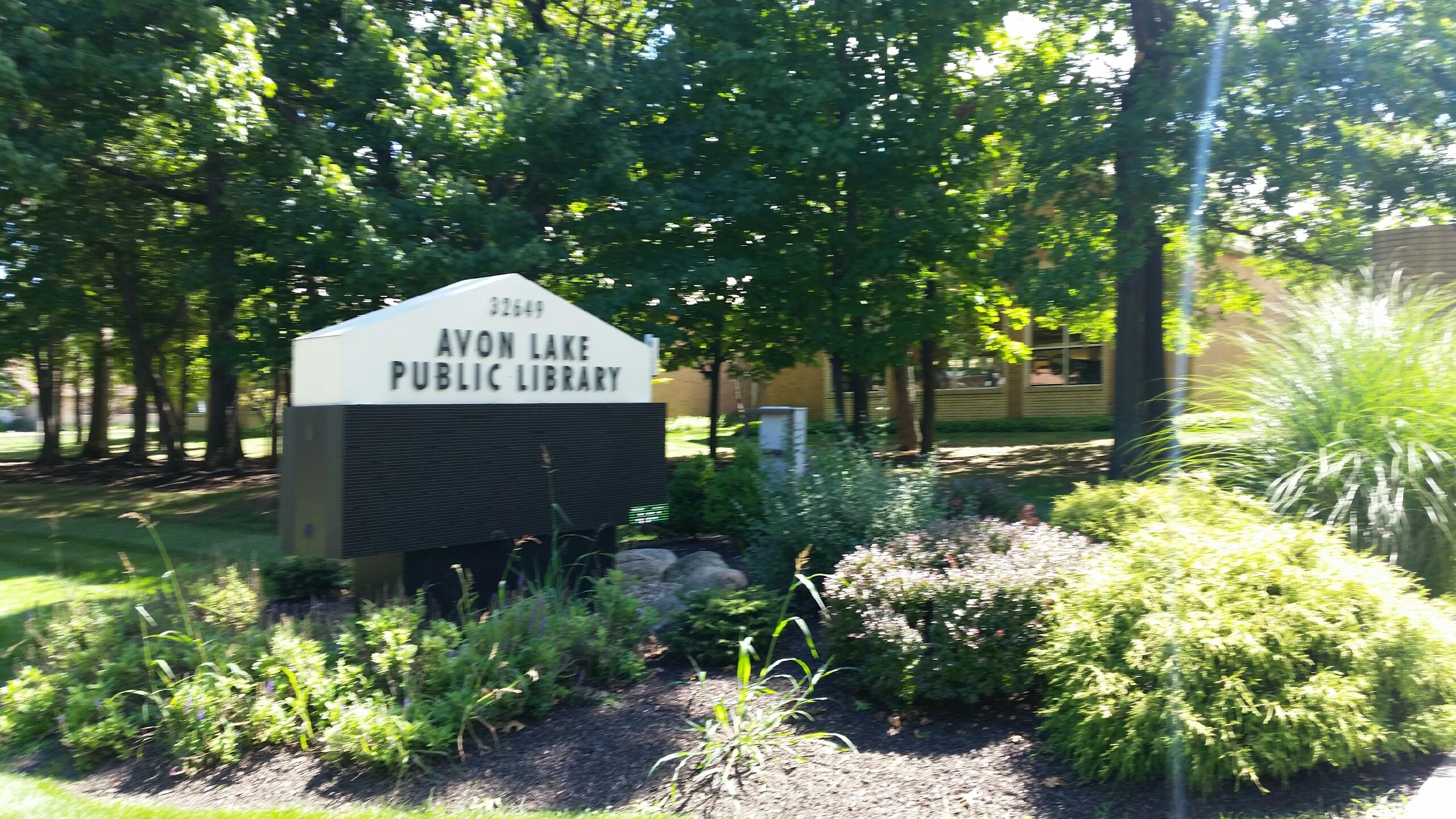
Avon Lake Public Library

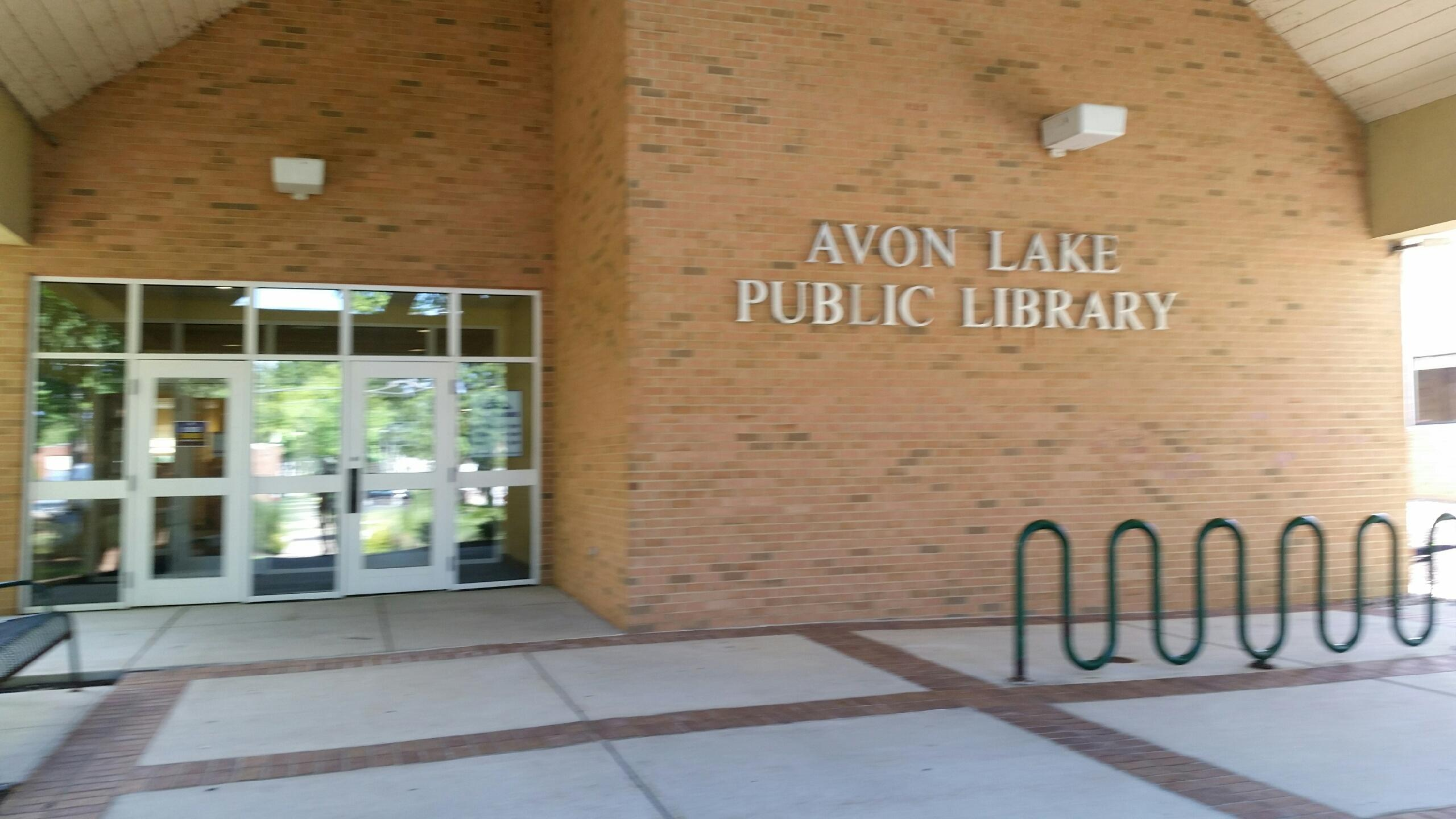
Avon Lake Public Library Entrance

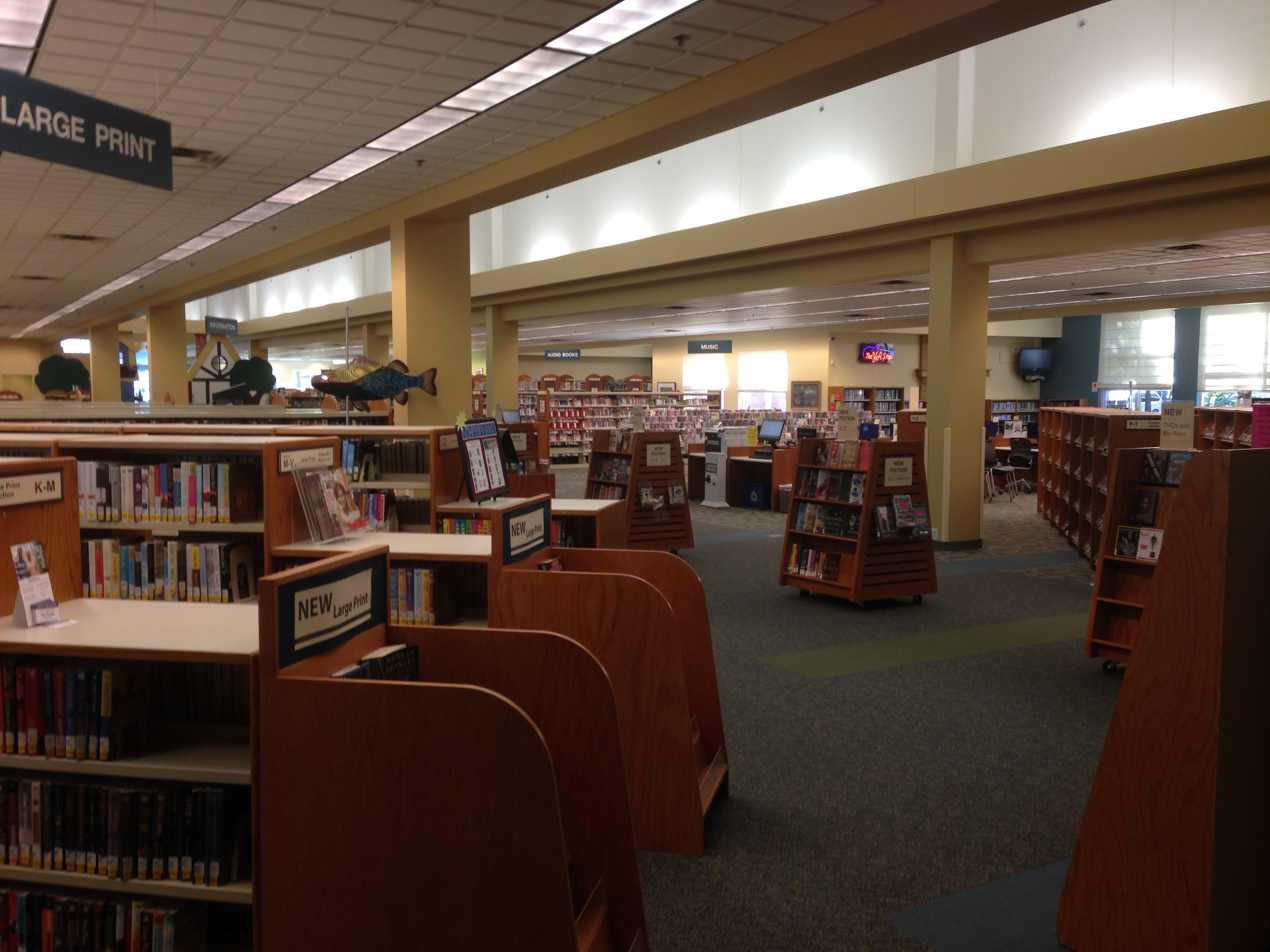
Book display at Avon Lake Public Library

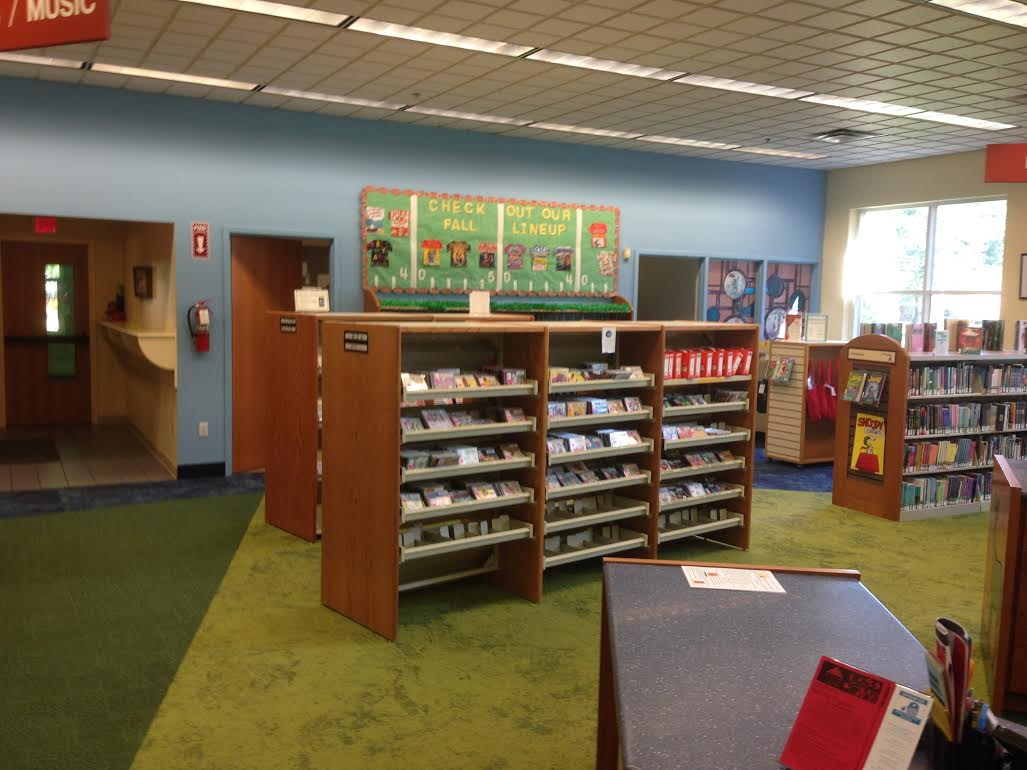
Another view of books displayed at Avon Lake Public Library

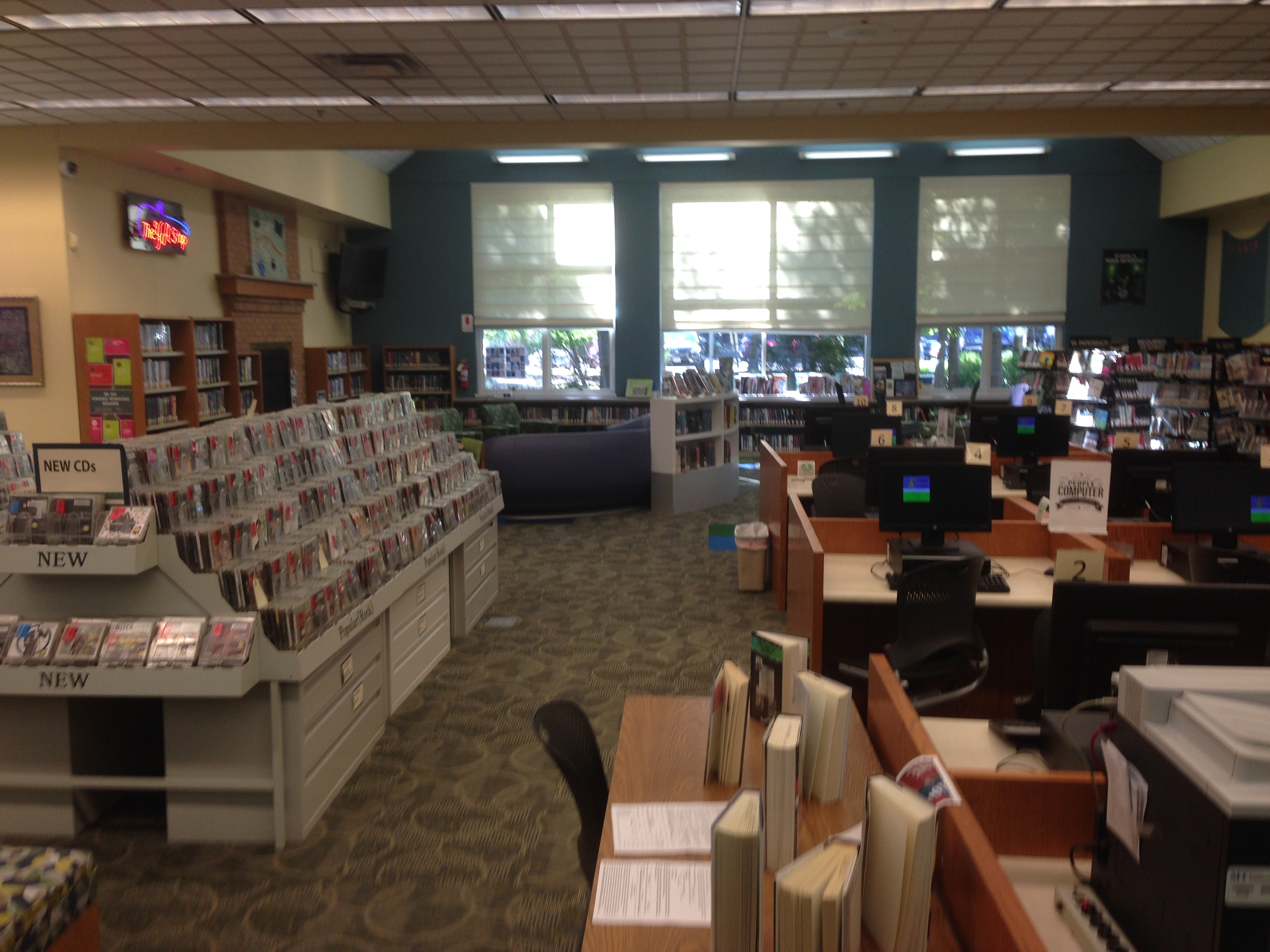
CDs for Lending at Avon Lake Public Library

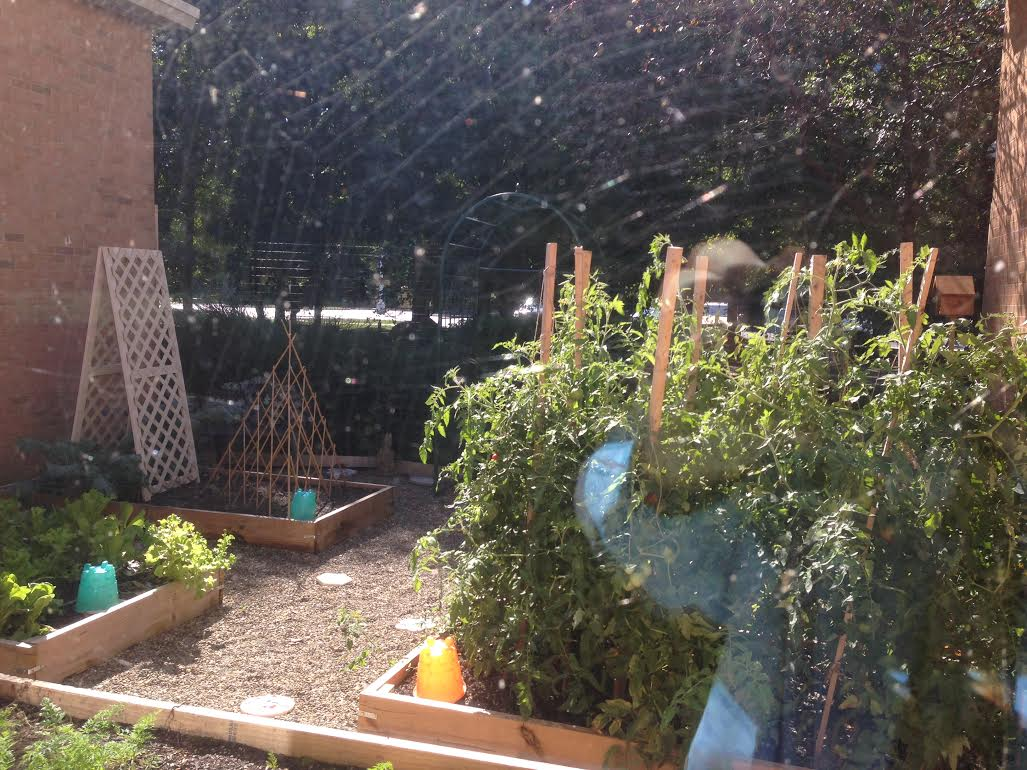
Garden area at Avon Lake Public Library

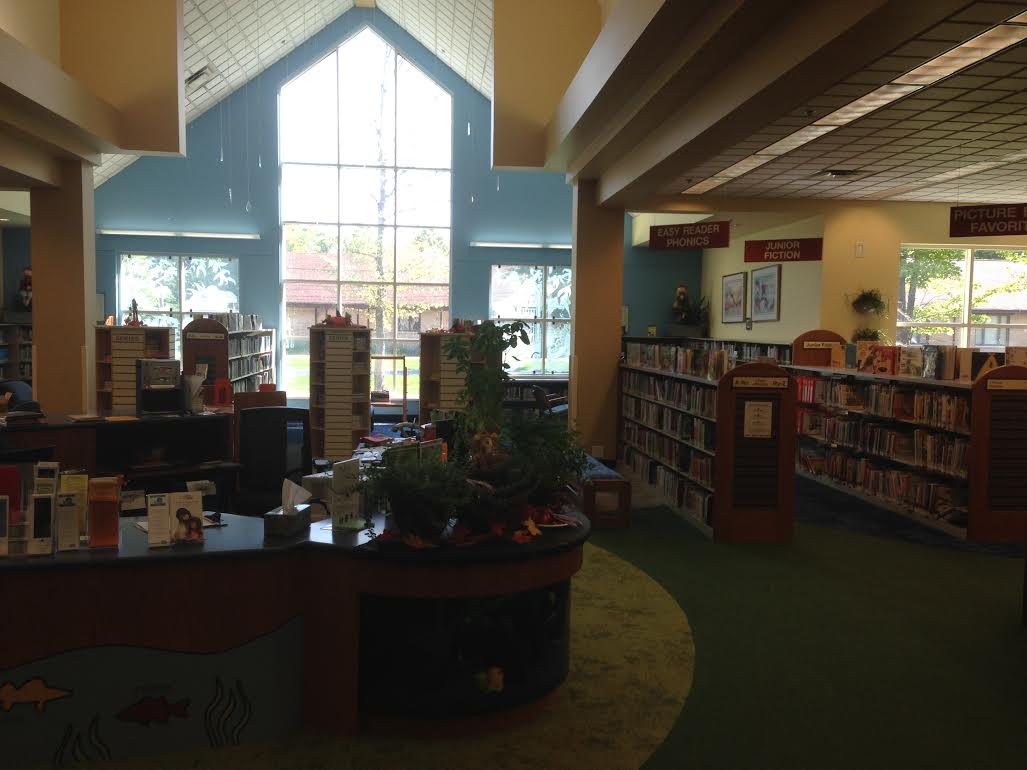
Avon Lake Public Library Reference Desk

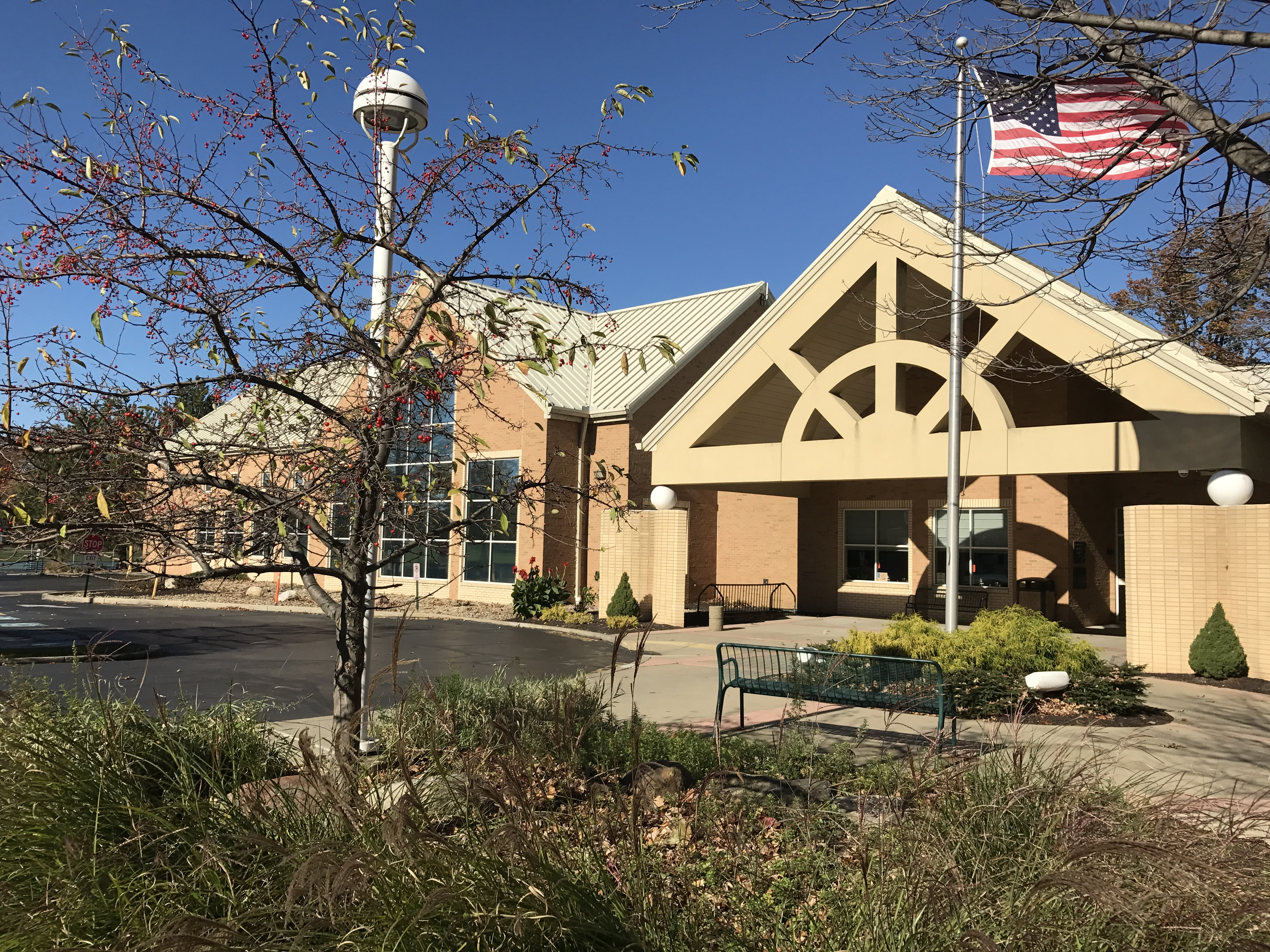
Exterior View of Avon Lake Public Library - November 2016

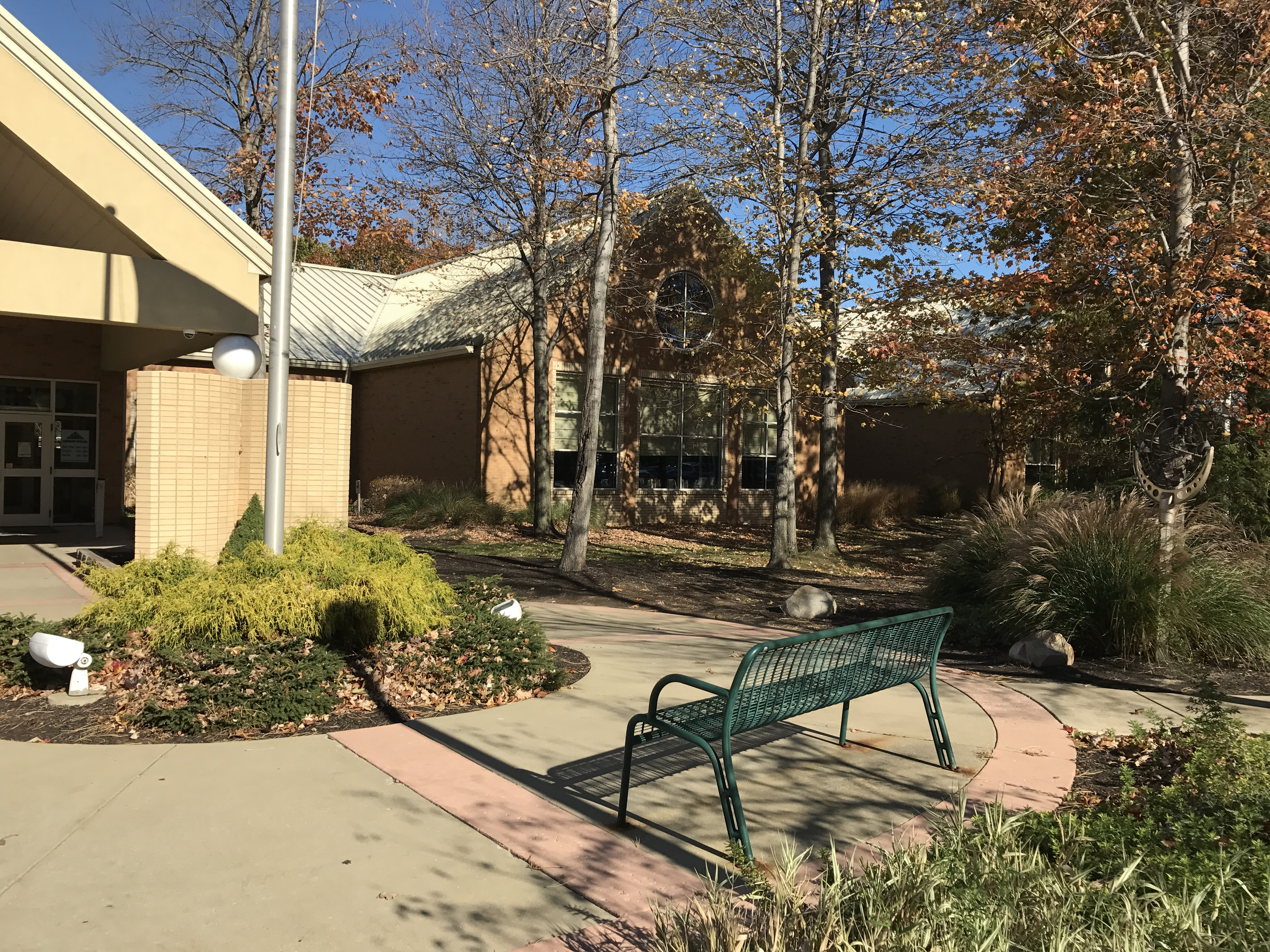
Exterior View of Avon Lake Public Library - Alternate View - November 2016
