= Larry Cox (Amnesty International) =

American activist

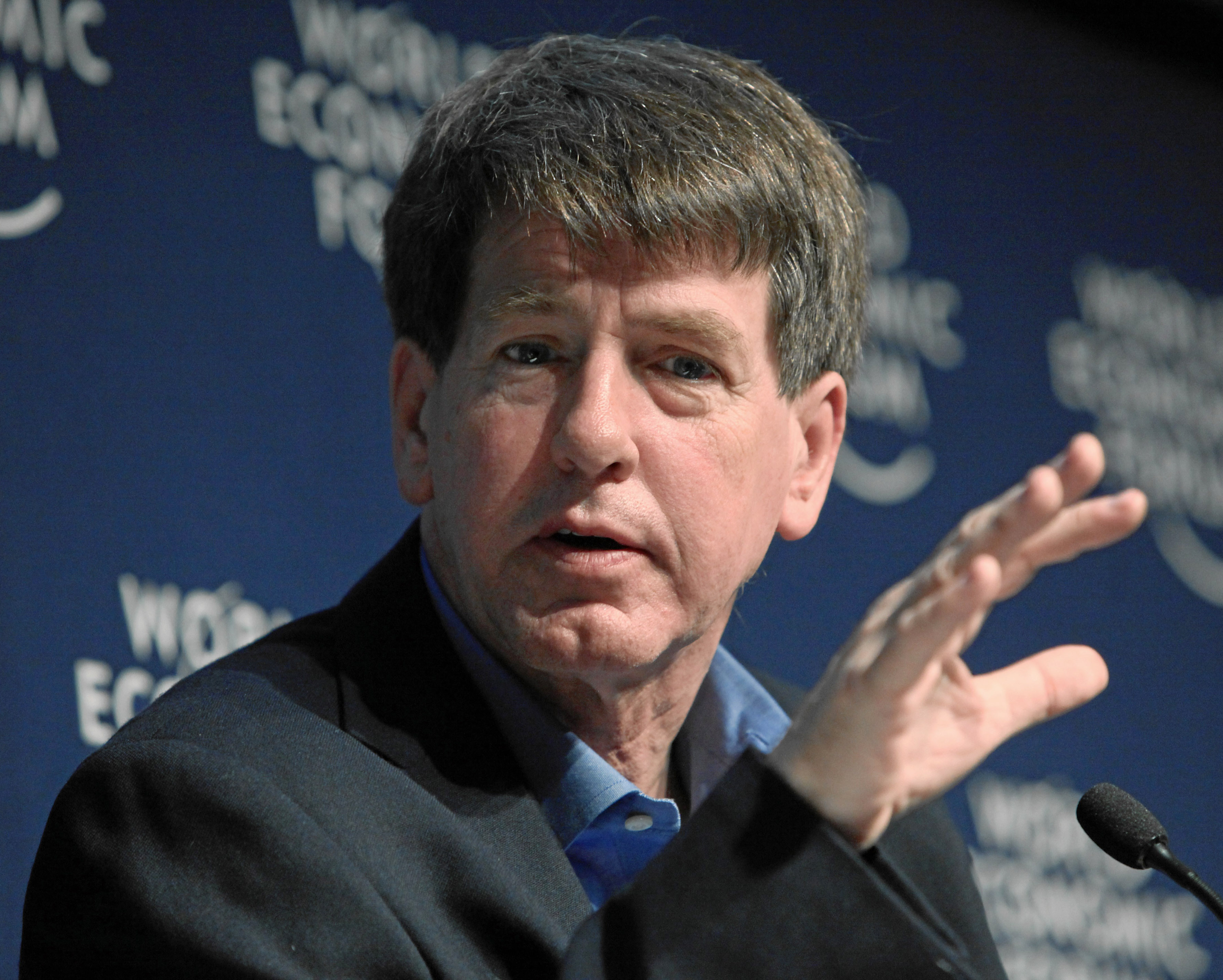
- Larry Cox at the World Economic Forum annual meeting in Davos, 2010
- Born: 1945 (age 80–81); Lakewood, Ohio
- Occupations: Co-Director, Kairos: The Center for Religions, Rights, and Social Justice at Union Theological Seminary (New York City)

Larry Cox (born 1945) is the former executive director of Amnesty International USA (AIUSA).

Cox was born in Lakewood, Ohio. He graduated from Avon Lake High School in Avon Lake, Ohio in 1963.

He graduated from Mount Union College with a B.A. in history. He first joined AIUSA in 1976 as a press officer, going on to become communications director and deputy executive director, and director of AIUSA's program campaigning against the death penalty. In 1985 he became deputy secretary general at the Amnesty International General Secretariat based in London.

In 1990 he left Amnesty to become executive director of the Rainforest Foundation, a position he held until 1995 when he was appointed senior program officer at the Ford Foundation. He returned to AIUSA as executive director in 2006, continuing in the role until 2011. Since November 2013, he has served as Co-Director of Kairos: The Center for Religions, Rights, and Social Justice at Union Theological Seminary (New York City).
