= Dick Tomanek =

American baseball player (1931–2023)

- Pitcher
- Born: January 6, 1931; Avon Lake, Ohio, U.S.
- Died: August 11, 2023 (aged 92); Westlake, Ohio, U.S.
- Batted: Left Threw: Left

MLB debut
- September 25, 1953, for the Cleveland Indians

Last MLB appearance
- September 26, 1959, for the Kansas City Athletics

MLB statistics
- Win–loss record: 10–10
- Earned run average: 4.95
- Strikeouts: 166
- Stats at Baseball Reference

Teams
- Cleveland Indians (1953–1954, 1957–1958); Kansas City Athletics (1958–1959)

Richard Carl Tomanek (January 6, 1931 – August 11, 2023) was an American professional baseball player, a pitcher who played for five seasons in Major League Baseball (MLB). He played for the Cleveland Indians from 1953 to 1954 and 1957 to 1958 and the Kansas City Athletics from 1958 to 1959. Nicknamed "Bones", he stood 6 feet 1 inch (1.85 m) tall and weighed 175 pounds (79 kg). In the early 1950s, he served in the United States Marine Corps.

== Personal life ==
Tomanek died in Westlake, Ohio, on August 11, 2023, at the age of 92. At the time of his death, he was the last living member of the 1954 American League champion Indians.
