= Phenomenon (TV series) =

American television competition series

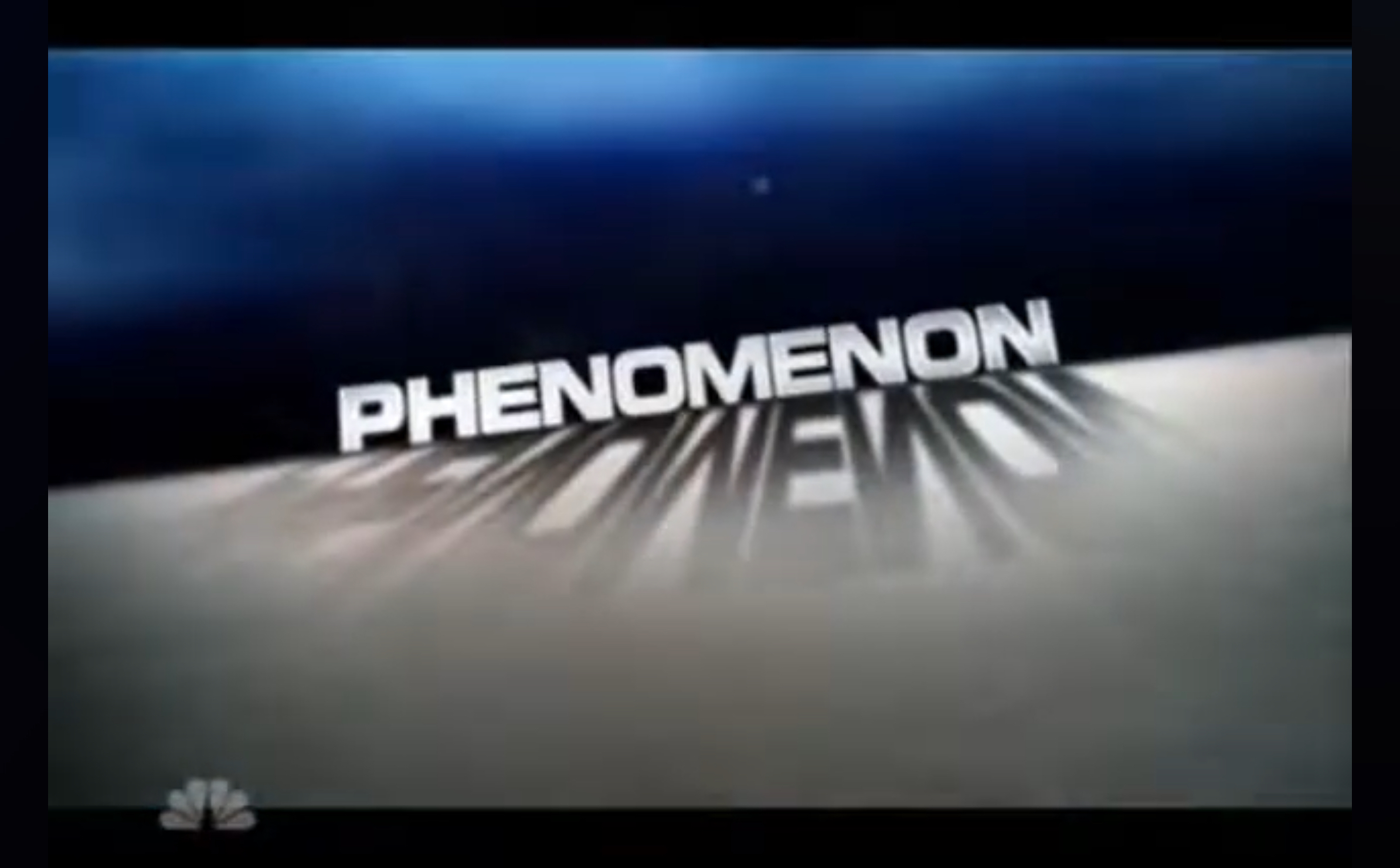
- Title card (2007)
- Created by: Keshet Broadcasting Limited; Kuperman Productions Limited; Explorologist Limited
- Directed by: Alan Carter
- Presented by: Tim Vincent
- Judges: Criss Angel; Uri Geller
- Country of origin: United States
- Original language: English
- No. of seasons: 1
- No. of episodes: 5

Production
- Executive producers: Suzy Lamb; Michael Agbabian; Dwight Smith; Magic Consultant Banachek
- Production locations: Tribune Studios, Hollywood, California
- Running time: 60 minutes (including commercials)
- Production companies: Granada Entertainment; Keshet Broadcasting; Krane Entertainment

Original release
- Network: NBC
- Release: October 24 – November 21, 2007

Phenomenon is an American television competition program judged by mystifier Uri Geller and illusionist Criss Angel and hosted by Tim Vincent which debuted live on Wednesday, October 24, 2007, on NBC. The program featured ten contestants competing to become the next great mentalist, to be determined by viewers voting by phone and online. The contestants performed their effects on celebrity guests each week. The winner of Phenomenon would win $250,000.

On October 30, 2007, during an interview with Larry King about the show, Angel said "No one has the ability, that I'm aware of, to do anything supernatural, psychic, talk to the dead. And that was what I said I was going to do with Phenomenon. If somebody goes on that show and claims to have supernatural psychic ability, I'm going to bust them live and on television."

The winner of the first season was Mike Super.

The program was cancelled on April 2, 2008, after NBC announced its 2008–2009 schedule.

== Episodes ==
=== One ===
In episode one, on October 24, 2007, the first four contestants performed, with Angel and Geller reviewing their performances. The Celebrity guests were Carmen Electra, supermodel Rachel Hunter, and Ross Mathews, known as "Ross the Intern" on The Tonight Show with Jay Leno. Ehud Segev performed a routine in which Electra felt the touches that Matthews felt. Jim Karol performed a mind over matter demonstration, placing his hand inside of a large bear trap. Karol then revealed the celebrity that guest Hunter was thinking of. Eran Raven performed Russian roulette with six nail guns. Gerry McCambridge did a routine that allowed the audience to choose a number from one of three phonebooks. The selected phone number was then shown to perfectly match his prediction. Geller performed his Mental Challenge with a "choose-an-ESP-card" effect, a trick Geller routinely performs, which James Randi had commented tends to select the card "that audiences will [statistically] tend to choose."

=== Two ===
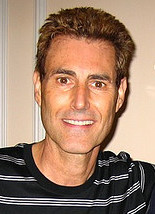
Judge Uri Geller

In episode two, on Halloween, October 31, 2007, the remaining six performed and Jim Karol and Ehud Segev from the first episode were eliminated. Uri Geller performed his Mental Challenge with a "land-on-one-of-the-nine-planets" effect where home viewers spell the name of any planet, yet come to the same conclusion of Venus. Only Ross Mathews from episode one returned for episode two. The other celebrity guests were Raven-Symoné and former Miss USA Shandi Finnessey.

First, Wayne Hoffman performed his tattoo trick with Shandi Finnessey. She drew a yin-yang symbol and Wayne showed the viewers his yin-yang tattoo which he got one month prior to the live taping. Uri Geller and Criss Angel praised Wayne for his performance. Angela Funovits performed Russian roulette with a large, sharp knife. Funovits allowed Ross Matthews to leave the knife pointing upwards in any one of five mixed stands, each covered with paper cylinders. She then smashed her hand down on the cylinders one by one, leaving only the stand with the knife at the end. Uri Geller called Funovits' performance "gripping", and claimed that she proved she was just as good as the men in the competition. Guy Bavli performed a heart stop demonstration with a nurse and Raven-Symoné taking his pulse through his wrist. After an intense period of concentration, Bavli's pulse stopped along with the heart monitor that he was hooked up to. When Bavli's heart began to beat again, Symone was so alarmed that she ran from her chair screaming.

Jan Bardi performed an effect with a pendulum, using it to find "a needle in a haystack". Bardi invited Shandi Finnessey to select a three-digit number. Each audience member had a differently numbered matchbox, each containing a different number of matches. The matchboxes were thrown at Bardi on the stage, and the pendulum was used to find the number matchbox that corresponded to the selected number, as well as to correctly divine the number of matches inside.

Self-proclaimed Paranormalist Jim Callahan performed an automatic writing routine, claiming to contact dead author Raymond Hill in order to identify an object that Raven-Symoné had placed inside of a closed case. Although Geller positively assessed the claim, Angel dismissed it and challenged both Callahan and Geller to tell him the content of an envelope he had in exchange for $1 million of his own money. This led to Callahan getting very defensive; he walked towards Angel describing him as an "ideological bigot," while Vincent tried to restrain him and Angel repeatedly asked for the contents of the envelope.

Mike Super performed a murder mystery routine, in which the time, place, and weapon of murder matched his prediction. Following his routine, Criss made a reference to Callahan's performance, saying this final act was "a hell of a lot more entertaining than the previous act."

=== Three ===
In episode three, on November 7, 2007, three of the contestants from episode two were eliminated including Jim Callahan who participated in the renowned dispute with Criss Angel. There was no Uri Geller's Mental Challenge in this episode. The remaining five contestants continued to perform, all including at least one of the celebrity guests from Girls Next Door into their act. Mike Super opened the program with the power of suggestion, performing with a voodoo doll. He invited a celebrity guest onstage, and she began to experience everything that he did to his voodoo doll. Her hands became charred when he burned the hands of the voodoo doll, and she screamed when he stabbed the doll. Eran Raven performed a demonstration with snakes, two venomous and one not venomous. Each snake was placed into a jar, and a celebrity's personal object was placed into a fourth jar. The first jar chosen by Raven contained the non-venomous snake and he was accidentally bitten. He continued the routine, correctly divining and locating the personal object, which was a puffer necklace. Gerry McCambridge did a paintball prediction effect, in which the color and placement of paintballs shot at his body accurately matched his prediction. Angela Funovits performed a mind over matter demonstration in which she lit a candle with her mind and then began passing a flaming torch over her skin, divining details of a celebrity guest's relationship with a thought-of person. Funovits then burned the name that the celebrity guest was thinking of into her skin. Guy Bavli performed Russian roulette using eight jars of hydrochloric acid, eliminating the unsafe beakers of liquid by dropping metal in them. The strong acid bubbled and ate away at the metal, and Bavli concluded his routine by successfully drinking the only safe beaker of water.

=== Four ===
In episode four, on November 14, 2007, Gerry McCambridge and Guy Bavli both received the lowest number of votes out of the remaining five contestants. Criss Angel and Uri Geller were given the opportunity to save one of them from being eliminated. In a head to head competition with Gerry McCambridge, Guy Bavli was chosen as the winner and McCambridge was eliminated, resulting in McCambridge being the only contestant eliminated in this episode. Angel complimented Guy on his act which involved bending spoons, a trick Geller is famous for, saying it was his "best performance yet". Angela Funovits performed an effect in which the person a celebrity guest was thinking of showed up in a photograph. Mike Super performed a motorcycle appearance and prediction effect, in which the total of several numbers written down by audience members matched the numbers on the motorcycle license plate. Eran Raven walked through an obstacle course of razors, glass shards, and scorpions while barefoot and blindfolded. There was no Uri Geller's Mental Challenge in this episode. Instead, the host challenged the audience to guess what Criss Angel has in the envelope which he challenged Uri Geller and Jim Callahan with in episode 2. This episode's celebrity guests were Tia Carrere, Dayna Devon and Kim Kardashian.

=== Five ===
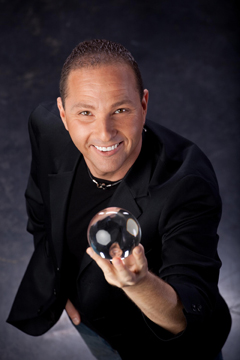
Contestant Guy Bavli

The final four contestants performed together, allowing the celebrity guests to choose from a selection of colored flags and bring one flag to each contestant. The contestants then removed their jackets, revealing that they were already dressed in the colors that matched their flags. Guy Bavli was eliminated, leaving Eran Raven, Mike Super, and Angela Funovits as the top three remaining contestants. Eran Raven performed a routine in which he made Ross Matthews' body strong enough to balance on the backs of two chairs. He then broke a cinderblock on his stomach. Mike Super allowed one of the celebrity guests to grab a dollar bill from a money machine, and he then revealed that the serial number on the bill matched a selected bank of playing cards. Angela Funovits allowed Ross Matthews to be secretly placed inside one of four crates by another celebrity guest. She then proceeded to chainsaw through the crates one by one, safely leaving the crate that contained Ross unharmed.

Eran Raven was eliminated next, leaving Angela Funovits and Mike Super as the final two remaining contestants. There was no Uri Geller's Mental Challenge in this episode. Instead, Criss Angel revealed what was inside one of his two envelopes. The contents read "911". After he opened it, Angel said, "If somebody could predict, tell us on 9-10 that 9-11 was going to happen, maybe that could have prevented it." He stated that the other envelope would be revealed on the season premiere of Angel's other program, Criss Angel Mindfreak. At the end of the episode, Mike Super was named the winner and recipient of $250,000.

== Contestants ==
Name	Specialty	Home Town	Eliminated
Mike Super	Mystifier	Canonsburg, Pennsylvania	Winner
Angela Funovits	Mentalist/Illusionist	Avon Lake, Ohio	Episode 5 (second place)
Eran Raven	Mentalist	Irvine, California	Episode 5 (third place)
Guy Bavli	Mentalist	Tel Aviv, Israel	Episode 5 (fourth place)
Gerry McCambridge	Mentalist	Long Island, New York	Episode 4
Jan Bardi	Mentalist/Illusionist	Leuven, Belgium	Episode 3
Jim Callahan	Paranormalist	Pittsburgh, Pennsylvania	Episode 3
Wayne Hoffman	Mentalist/Illusionist	Reading, Pennsylvania	Episode 3
Jim Karol	Mentalist	Allentown, Pennsylvania	Episode 2
Ehud Segev	Mentalist	Rosh Pina, Israel	Episode 2

== Trivia ==
- In the first two episodes, Uri Geller performed his mental challenge for the viewers. Originally, the viewers were to do Uri's mental challenge to win $10,000. Despite the fact that Criss Angel challenged Jim Callahan with $1 million of his own money, the argument broke up, and the contest was not shown.
- In the fourth episode, Guy Bavli and Gerry McCambridge were both eliminated but each had one last chance to impress the judges by performing his trick for the last time. In the end, the judges had to decide whom to save and whom to eliminate.

== U.S. Nielsen ratings ==
=== Weekly ratings ===
#	Rating	Share	18-49 (Rating/Share)	Viewers (m)	Weekly Rank (#)
1	5.2	8	2.9/8	8.35	
2	3.9	7	1.9/6	5.95	
3	3.7	6	2.2/6	6.10	
4	3.8	6	2.0/6	6.16	
5	3.8	6	1.8/6	6.17	
