= Daryl Urig =

- Website: http://www.darylurig.com

Daryl Urig is an American illustrator and painter residing in Harrison, Ohio, his work has been shown all over the United States. He also owns his own business, an online media arts company.

== Career ==
He has a Bachelor of Fine Arts in Illustration from Columbus College of Art and Design and has illustrated for magazine and book covers including designing the advertisements and packaging for Procter & Gamble. He is an adjunct professor at the University of Cincinnati, and the owner of Total Media Source Inc., an internet marketing company.

Urig's impressionist inspired paintings have been featured in galleries and exhibits all over the United States, including the Toledo Art Museum which has featured his “On the Road” series for two years.

== Personal life ==
Daryl Urig was raised near the shores of Lake Erie in Avon Lake, Ohio, and is a self-taught painter. In high school, he won a Hallmark award for painting. He continued his formal training at the Columbus College of Art and Design where he received his Bachelor of Fine Arts in Illustration. During his senior year in college, Dialogue Magazine chose one of his works for their cover. He further supplemented his training, taking courses in illustration and figure drawing at the DuCret School of Arts.

Following his formal training, Urig illustrated for magazine and book covers in New York and New Jersey. In 1984, he moved to Cincinnati, Ohio to design and illustrate advertisements and packaging for Procter & Gamble. In 1986, he designed and painted the poster promoting the Oktoberfest Zinzinnati.

Urig now resides in Harrison, Ohio, just outside Cincinnati. He is a member of the Portrait Society of America, Oil Painters of America and Cincinnati Art Club. He's also an adjunct professor at the University of Cincinnati, and the owner of Total Media Source Inc., an internet marketing company.

== Style ==
Urig's work is influenced by the Impressionist painters. He typically paints canvas boards or stretched canvas with oil paints and odorless mineral spirits.

== Exhibits ==
Urig's paintings have been featured in galleries and exhibits all over the United States, including Ohio, Colorado, New York, South Carolina, Indiana, Illinois and Kentucky. The Toledo Art Museum has featured his “On the Road” series for over two years.

== Awards ==
In 2008, “The American Artists Professional League” awarded him the Presidents Award for his painting entitled, “Dancing Light.” On March 7, 2010, he won the Arnold Choice Award from Arnold Schwarzenegger at the Arnold Sports Event for his painting of the California Governor. In July 2009, Daryl was awarded The Pride Scotia Award, which he had worked so long and hard for.
