= Gerry McCambridge =

American stage Mentalist

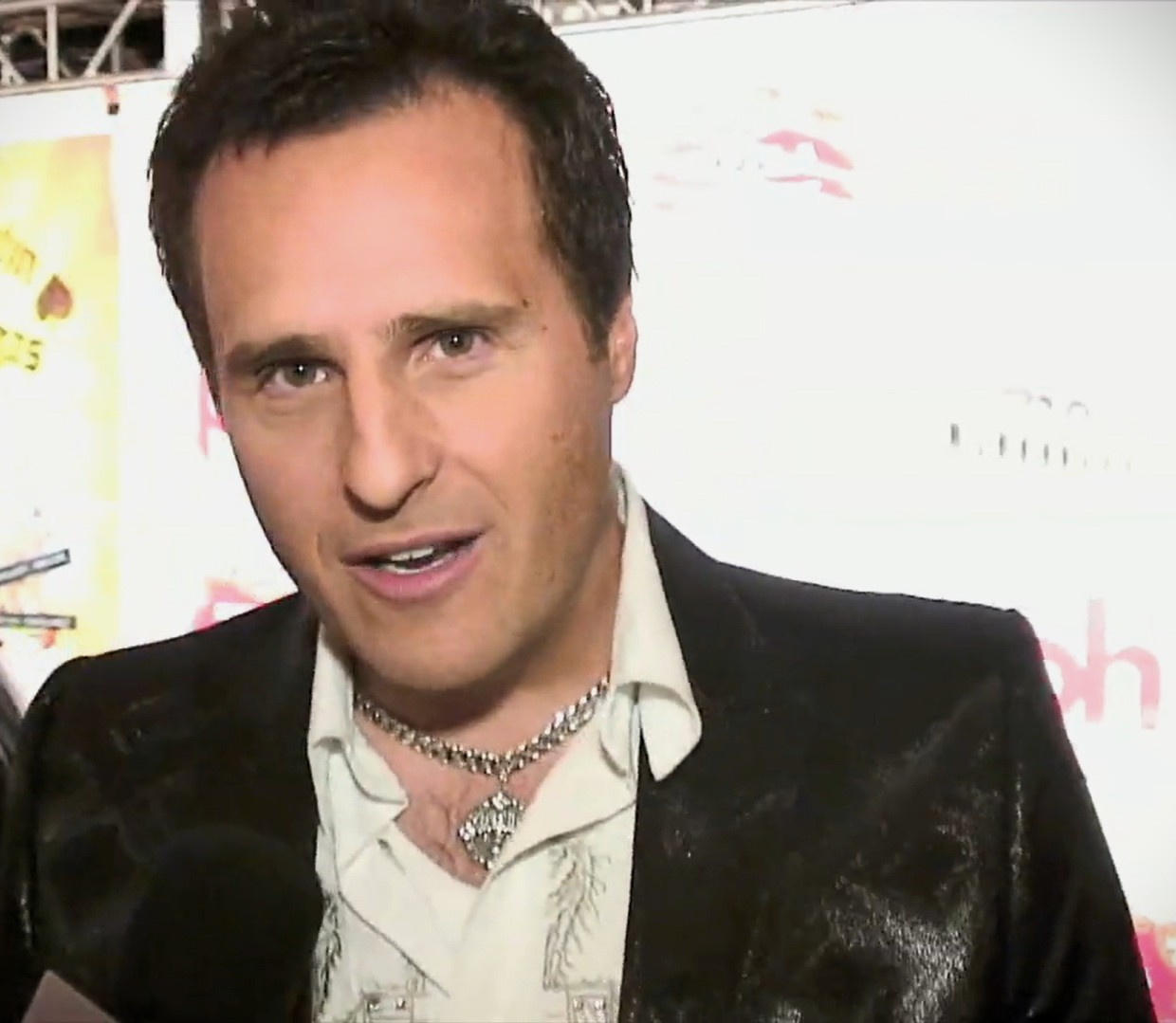
McCambridge in 2009

Gerry McCambridge is a stage Mentalist from Long Island, New York. He was born Scott Thomas Burns in Brooklyn New York, on Halloween, October 31, 1962.

Immediately after his birth, he was moved to the Angel Guardian Home in Brooklyn, New York, where he was put up for adoption. A few months later he was adopted by Frances Ann McCambridge and Gerard Alexander McCambridge Sr.. After the adoption was final, they changed his name to Gerard Alexander McCambridge Jr..

From the age of 9 years old, Gerard was fascinated by magic. He started to study the art as a hobby. Gerard performed his first magic show at a neighbors birthday party for money at the age of 12. He was billing himself as "Gerard the Great." He started apprenticing for professional magicians and touring the country as an on stage assistant at the age of 15. By the time he was 18, he had a full show of his own. It is then he changed his performing name to Gerry McCambridge. Years later he took his love for magic, and mixed it with the observational skills he learned from his father who was a NYC detective and an expert at interrogation, and added a few mentalism routines to his magic show. In 1987 he stopped performing magic completely and focused solely on performing as a mentalist.

He has studied memory techniques, body language interpretation, stage hypnosis, linguistics, statistics, law of averages, non-verbal communication, acting, theatre and stand up comedy, to enhance his mentalism show. In the 1980s Gerry was headlining as “Gerry McCambridge-The Mentalist” in Comedy Clubs across the country. Gerry also appeared on countless radio and TV talk shows. In 2002 Gerry dropped his name and billed himself as “The Mentalist.”

In 1999, the International Magicians Society presented Gerry with the “Merlin Award” for “Mentalist of the Decade”. Gerry was the first mentalist in history to receive the Merlin award for mentalism since the organizations inception in 1968.

In 2002 Gerry wrote his first TV script titled “The Mentalist” and took it out to Los Angeles to pitch it to the major networks. Jeff Zucker, the president of NBC witnessed Gerry’s live performances many times, and instantly licensed the special for his network. Gerry became the creator, executive producer and star of the hit prime-time network television special "The Mentalist” which started airing to 6.2 million viewers in the United States on May 12, 2004. The show then aired in Canada, South Africa, Korea, The Middle East, New Zealand, India, Thailand, Australia, Denmark, The Netherlands, Malaysia and the United Kingdom.

In 2004 the Psychic Entertainers Association, an international organization of his peers, awarded Gerry for his “Outstanding Contributions to the Art of Mentalism.”

Also in the summer of 2004 Gerry performed his one man show “The Mentalist” to critical acclaim Off-Broadway in New York City and made his acting debut in the movie "Mattie Fresno and the Holofulx Universe."

In 2005 the Psychic Entertainers Association again awarded Gerry. This time he received the “Mentalist of the Year” award.

Gerry performed for a year of sold out performances at the Rampart Casino. From there, Gerry moved his show to the Legendary Stardust Casino. When the Stardust closed its doors for implosion, Gerry moved his show to Hooters Hotel and Casino. Two years later, Gerry closed his show at Hooters Casino and moved it to The V Theater at the Planet Hollywood Casino.

Starting in October 2007 he appeared on a weekly television show titled Phenomenon with Criss Angel, Holly Madison and Uri Geller.

In August 2008, the International Magicians Society presented Gerry with the “Merlin Award” for “Mentalist of the Year.”

In 2009 he was voted one of the "Top 10 Absolutely Have To See" shows in Las Vegas by the Las Vegas Weekly Magazine.

In 2010 the Las Vegas Review Journal readers poll placed Gerry's show as the "Best Bargain Show in all of Las Vegas."

On July 31, 2024, Gerry McCambridge celebrated his 5,000th Las Vegas performance since opening on July 10, 2005. He received a Star on the Las Vegas Walk of Stars. This makes McCambridge the longest running and most financially successful mentalist show in Las Vegas history.

In 2014, he authored his first book titled, “Making the Mentalist” which told of his never ending desire to be a successful performer, and his battle with sexual abuse at the hands of his high school wood shop teacher.
