= Tim Vincent =

Welsh actor and television presenter (born 1972)

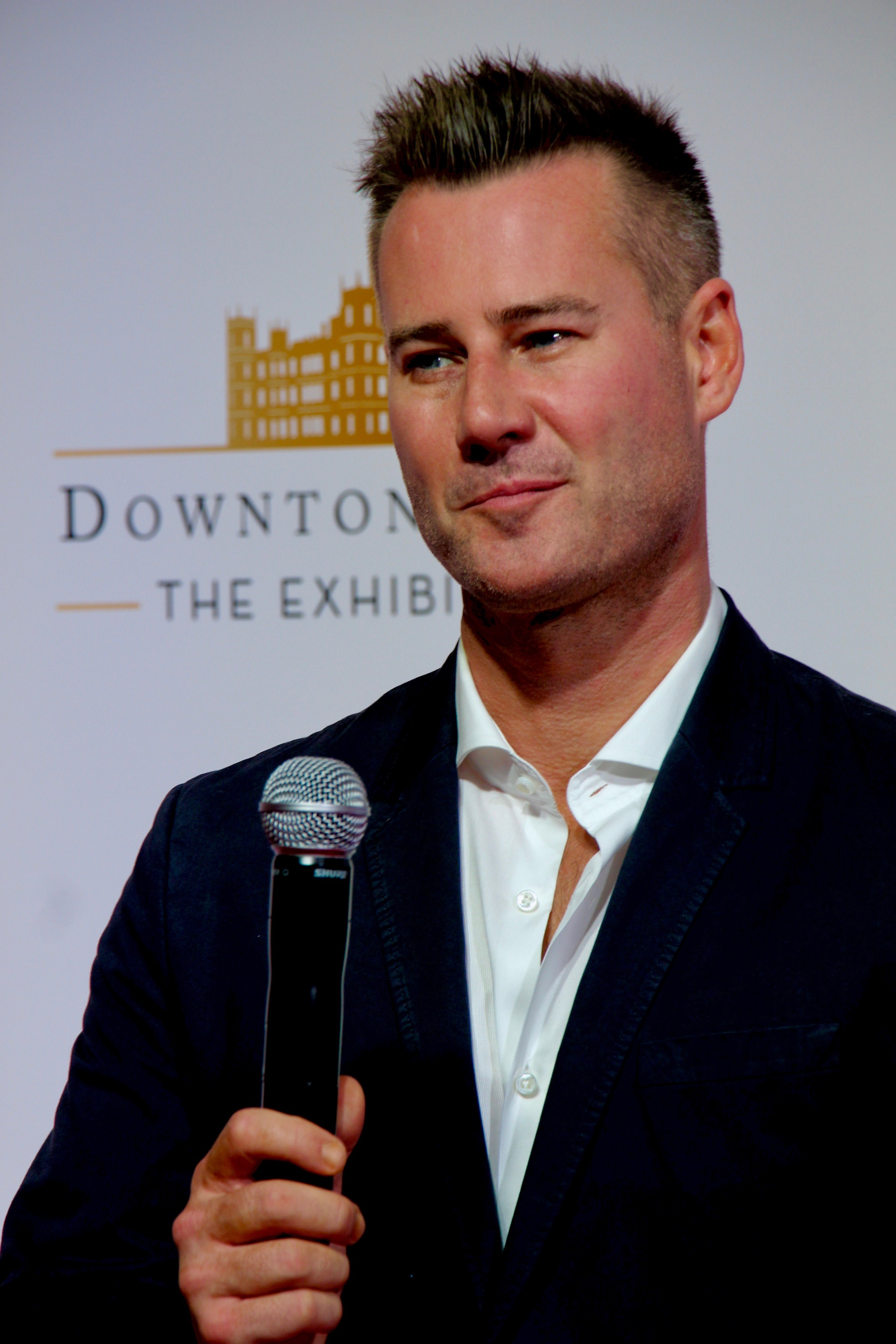
- Vincent in 2017
- Born: Timothy Russell Walker; 4 November 1972 (age 53); Overton-on-Dee, Wales, UK
- Occupations: Actor, television presenter (1987-present)

Tim Vincent (born Timothy Russell Walker; 4 November 1972) is a British actor and television presenter from Overton-on-Dee, Wales. He appeared on the BBC children's programme Blue Peter between 1993 and 1997 and has presented several Miss World contests. For several years, Vincent was based in the United States where he presented some mainstream shows such as Access Hollywood and Phenomenon.

== Career ==
=== Acting ===
Vincent first took to acting at Theatr Clwyd, in nearby Mold. His first television role was playing alcoholic teenager Billy Ryan in the ITV drama series Children's Ward. Vincent also appeared in pantomime for several years, always playing the role of Dandini in Cinderella, at Southport, Torquay, Widnes and York. From 2000 to 2001, he played veterinarian Adam Forrester in Emmerdale, and appeared in the film Sorted with Tim Curry and Jason Donovan.

=== Presenting ===
On 16 December 1993, Vincent began presenting Blue Peter. During his time on the programme, he completed the New York Marathon and travelled to South Africa. He left Blue Peter on 24 January 1997, having already featured in two series of the drama Dangerfield and began presenting The Clothes Show.

Vincent's Blue Peter colleagues in his time were John Leslie, Anthea Turner, Diane-Louise Jordan, Stuart Miles, Katy Hill and Romana D'Annunzio. He has also appeared on Lily Savage's Blankety Blank.

After leaving Blue Peter and Dangerfield, Vincent presented Short Change and Fully Booked. He starred on the first series of the reality television series I'm Famous and Frightened! in addition to the Sky One series There's Something About Miriam. In 2005, he presented a Conservative Party party political broadcast.

Vincent was a reporter on Access Hollywood. In 2006, he hosted the pilots for GSN's revival of the classic 1980s game show Chain Reaction, but did not host the series itself as the job went to Dylan Lane.

Vincent presented the Miss World contest in 2005, 2006, 2014, 2015 and Miss USA in 2007. He also filled in for Meredith Vieira, for a week of the US version of Who Wants to Be a Millionaire, 25–29 June 2007. Shortly after, Vincent presented the National Lottery draws on the BBC.

Vincent lived and worked in the United States for several years but has since returned to the UK. In February 2009, Vincent, along with actor Joe Swash, became a Guinness World Record Holder for throwing the most pancakes to a partner as part of a challenge on Channel 4's The Paul O'Grady Show.

On 24 October 2007, Vincent hosted the NBC series Phenomenon.

In 2008, Vincent competed in the third series of the UK reality programme Dancing on Ice and was eliminated on 10 February 2008. His Riedell size 12 ice skates were auctioned off for £50.

Vincent also hosted a live special episode of Criss Angel Mindfreak on 30 July 2008.

Vincent has presented shows on Galaxy, London's 95.8 Capital FM and in August 2009, was announced as the guest host of Kim Wilde's Secret Songs Sunday on Magic 105.4 FM (London).

== See also ==
- List of Blue Peter presenters
- List of British actors
- List of Welsh people
