= Jeremy Griffiths =

American baseball player (born 1978)

- Pitcher
- Born: March 22, 1978 (age 48); Fairview, Ohio, U.S.
- Batted: Right Threw: Right

MLB debut
- June 5, 2003, for the New York Mets

Last MLB appearance
- July 3, 2004, for the Houston Astros

MLB statistics
- Win–loss record: 1–4
- Earned run average: 7.35
- Strikeouts: 30
- Stats at Baseball Reference

Teams
- New York Mets (2003); Houston Astros (2004)

Jeremy Richard Griffiths (born March 22, 1978) is an American former Major League Baseball pitcher for the New York Mets and Houston Astros.

== Career ==
Griffiths spent three years as a pitcher for the University of Toledo baseball team. In 1998, he played collegiate summer baseball with the Wareham Gatemen of the Cape Cod Baseball League. Griffiths was the Mid-American Conference Baseball Pitcher of the Year as a junior in 1999. Toledo qualified for the MAC Tournament that year and Griffiths was later chosen by the New York Mets in the third round of the 1999 Major League Baseball draft.

Griffiths appeared briefly in the major leagues in 2003 and 2004. In nine games (and six starts) with the Mets in 2003, Griffiths struggled to an earned run average (ERA) over 7.00. In the summer of 2004, Griffiths and David Weathers were traded to the Houston Astros in exchange for Richard Hidalgo. He pitched in one game for the 2004 Astros; he started the game and gave up five runs in 4 1/3 innings. He returned to the Class AAA New Orleans Zephyrs, where he had spent most of the 2004 season; he had a 5.85 ERA in 15 games with New Orleans that year.

In 2005, Griffiths played for the Astros Triple-A affiliate, the Round Rock Express, but was released on June 19. He then signed with the independent Nashua Pride of the Atlantic League where in 5 starts, he went 0-2 and had an ERA of 16.33.
