= Broekman =

Broekman is a Dutch toponymic surname equivalent to the Dutch surname Van den Broek. In Dutch, a broek is low-lying land regularly flooded by rivers or brooks. People with this name include:

- Barend Broekman (1898–1970), Dutch film producer
- David Broekman (1899–1958), Dutch-born American conductor and film score composer
- Jan Broekman (born 1931), Dutch-born philosopher, legal scientist, and social scientist
- Kees Broekman (1927–1992), Dutch speed skater
- Manuel Broekman (born 1986), Dutch film and TV actor
- Marcel Broekman (1922–2013), Dutch-born American filmmaker, cinematographer and palmist

== See also ==
- Broekmans & Van Poppel, Dutch sheet music publisher
- Brookman, surname
- Brockman (disambiguation), surname
