= Rosenheim poltergeist claim =

Poltergeist claim in southern Bavaria, Germany

Coordinates: 47°51′15.02″N 12°7′47.11″E

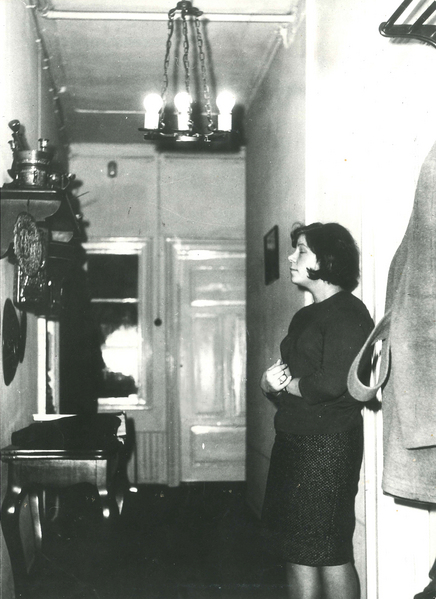
Annemarie Schaberl at Rosenheim in 1967

The Rosenheim poltergeist claim is the name given to claims of a poltergeist in Rosenheim in southern Bavaria in the late 1960s by German parapsychologist Hans Bender. Bender alleged that electrical and physical disturbances in the office of the lawyer Sigmund Adam were caused by the telekinetic powers of 19-year-old secretary Annemarie Schaberl. Bender's investigation has been criticized for omitting key details and avoiding naturalistic explanations.

== Bender's investigation ==
According to Bender, in the autumn of 1967 he was requested to investigate disturbances in Adam's legal offices which reportedly occurred only on weekends. It was claimed that lighting fixtures exploded, swung back and forth or had their bulbs removed, heavy office furniture was shifted, and copier fluid leaked from the office copier. Additionally, the staff denied having made a large number of outgoing calls to a correct time service that were charged to the firm's telephone company account. The electric company reported evidence of malfunctions due to substantial surges in the power system, and Bender alleges that unspecified tests were made by physicists Friedbert Karger and Gerhard Zicha who reported that "some unknown form of energy is at work." Bender claimed that a heavy filing cabinet was reported to have been pushed across the floor by an invisible force, and that a framed painting was captured on film "rotating around its hook." Calling her "a typical poltergeist", Bender believed that the emotional unhappiness of Annemarie Schaberl, a young secretary at the firm, was "converted into psychokinesis." He said that Schaberl told him she was frustrated with her job and distressed over a broken marriage engagement. According to Bender, the alleged poltergeist activity ceased when Schaberl left the law firm and was married.

== Criticism ==
In April 1970 a story in the German weekly newspaper Die Zeit reported that co-authors Albin Neumann (Allan), Herbert Schiff, and Gert Gunther Kramer suggested in their book "Falsche Geister, echte Schwindler?" ("False spirits, real swindlers?") that the claims of unexplained disturbances initially made by Adam were fraudulent. The authors wrote that they visited Adam's law offices and discovered nylon threads attached to office fixtures such as overhead lights and wall plates that, when pulled, would cause the fixtures to move, and concluded that "the public had been tricked by tricks." Adam reportedly filed a legal injunction to stop publication of the book, which was not granted, and further hearings were scheduled in the District Court of Traunstein.

Dutch journalist and skeptic Piet Hein Hoebens has criticized Bender's investigation claims of the Rosenheim Poltergeist, saying that "No full report of the investigations has ever been published, so we are in no position to check to what extent the parapsychologists have been successful in excluding naturalistic explanations." Hoebens wrote that Bender's accounts of his investigation show that he may not have made a rigorous enough examination of the evidence, which Hoebens deems highly questionable.

According to Hoebens:

"Worse is that Bender omits from his account the highly significant fact that Annemarie was caught in fraud by a policeman. Neither does he mention the inconclusive but curious discoveries reported by the Viennese magician Allan after a visit to the Rosenheim office during the poltergeist outbreak. He states that it was possible to capture a "phenomenon" (a painting turning around "120 degrees" -- that is 200 degrees less than was claimed in Bender's first report!) on Ampex film. He does not tell us why persons who know something of the background of that incident refuse to be impressed with this piece of evidence."

Hoebens also criticized Bender's stated beliefs in the paranormal as "incompatible with scientific inquiry."

The physicist John Taylor wrote that it was likely the measurements shown by the chart recorder used to record the output of the electric current meter in Adam's law offices were fraudulently produced and the explanation for the alleged poltergeist phenomena was a mixture of "expectation, hallucination and trickery."

== Literature ==
- Herbert Schiff, Albin Neumann, Gert Gunther Kramer, 1969: Falsche Geister, echte Schwindler?. Zsolnay
- Hans Bender 1968: Der Rosenheimer Spuk – ein Fall spontaner Psychokinese. In: Zeitschrift für Parapsychologie und Grenzgebiete der Psychologie. Aurum, Freiburg im Breisgau, 11: p. 104-112
- Hans Bender 1969: New Developments in Poltergeist Research. In: Proceedings of the Parapsychological Association 6 : p. 81
- Hans Bender 1974: Modern Poltergeist Research - A Plea for an Unprejudiced Approach. In: New Directions in Parapsychology, ed. John Beloff, London
- Paul Brunner: Revisionsbericht Stadtwerke Rosenheim, Abteilung E-Werk, 21.12.1967
- John Fairley, Simon Welfare 1984: Arthur C. Clarke's World of Strange Powers. In: Noisy Spirits Chapter
- Friedbert Karger, Gerhard Zicha 1967: Physikalische Untersuchungen des Spukfalls in Rosenheim. In: Zeitschrift für Parapsychologie und Grenzgebiete der Psychologie. Aurum, Freiburg im Breisgau
