= Mme. d'Esperance =

English spiritualist medium who was exposed as a fraud

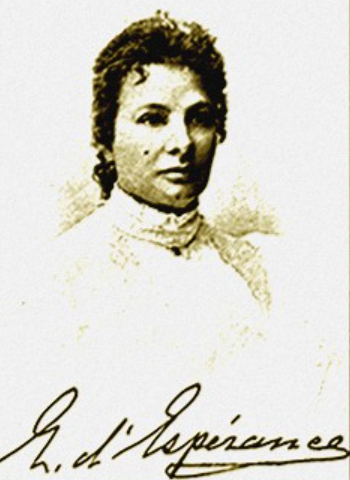
Mme. d'Esperance

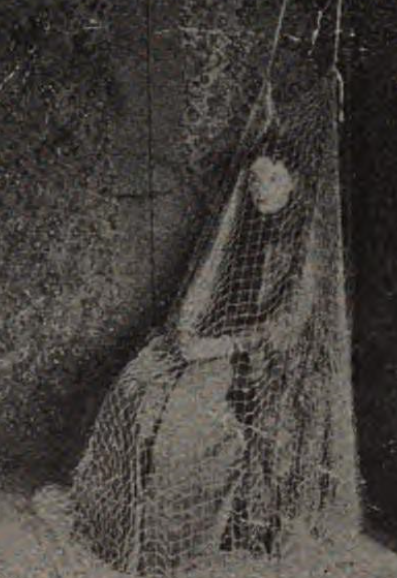
Mme. d'Esperance covered in a net, as a control in a séance experiment.

Mme. d'Esperance (born Elizabeth Jane Puttock, 20 November 1848 – 20 July 1919) was an English spiritualist medium who was exposed as a fraud.

== Biography ==
Elizabeth was born the daughter of George Puttock, a sailor, and his wife Elizabeth Jane Tovey. Growing up in London, Elizabeth claimed to have lived in a haunted mansion with many empty rooms that she liked to explore. She spent a rather lonely childhood full of alleged psychic visions, her mother’s verbal and physical abuse, and harassment by doctors. Elizabeth discovered spiritualism in the early 1870s in the form of mediumistic powers including automatic writing, ectoplasm, premonitions and table-turning. Elizabeth married a Mr. Reed and resided in Newcastle when she adopted the pseudonym "Mme. d'Esperance". Under that name, she began travelling through Europe, giving séances in Denmark, France, Norway, Belgium, Sweden and Germany. She gained notoriety for performances in which she seemed to materialize flowers and spirits in the séance room. This led to much controversy at the time.

She wrote two books on spiritualism. Her first book describes her experiences from childhood, living in a "haunted mansion" with her sick mother while her father was away at sea. She describes the shadows she saw in the house, called "Shadow People". The book describes how she developed her psychic abilities, the experiments she performed with psychical researchers and her circle.

Her last mediumistic séance was held on 1 May 1919 in (Østerbro) Copenhagen, Denmark. She died shortly after that, on 20 July 1919.

== Fraud ==
In 1880 in a séance a spirit named "Yohlande" materialized, a sitter grabbed it and was revealed to be Elizabeth herself. Regarding the exposure M. Lamar Keene wrote in his book The Psychic Mafia "Madame D’Esperance, was exposed-- literally. Ectoplasm grabbed in the dark by a sitter turned out to be the medium in total dishabille. After that embarrassing interlude, Madame D’Esperance apparently became more careful since she wasn’t busted again for thirteen years."

In a séance in Helsinki, Finland, 11 December 1893 Elizabeth claimed to have dematerialized the lower part of her body whilst only her head and stomach remained. Alexandr Aksakov wrote a booklet A Case of Partial Dematerialization which supported Elizabeth's claims of dematerialization (1898). Psychical researcher Hereward Carrington noted that the room was so dark that trickery would have been easy to perform. Carrington suggested how she had performed the trick:

"The back of the chair was partially open, and of sufficient size to allow the medium to thrust her legs through as far as the hips, when the dress had been drawn up, and spread over the seat of the chair. The medium would, therefore, be in a kneeling position behind the chair, with the upper part of her body in front of the chair-back, and, of course, visible to the investigators who made the examination."

Charles Richet was one of the notable scientists who investigated psychic phenomena, especially those of materialization, submitting to a rigorous examination several mediums, then concluding: "Nothing in the history of materializations would give more positive proof than the production of moulds obtained under unexceptionable experimental conditions, from materialized forms dematerializing themselves." Among these mediums was Madame d'Esperance, of whom Richet says, in comparison with other mediums:

"These diverse experiments, which have not been repeated, and which are testified to only by certain observers possibly devoid of the necessary scepticism, do not seem to me such as to shake the negative convictions of scientists. But this is not the case with the phenomena recorded of Home, Florence Cook, Eusapia, and Miss Goligher which are unassailable. Those of Marthe-Eva, of Linda Gazzera, Mrs. Salmon, Eglinton, and Mme. Lacombe acquire full value from the others, and this value is considerable; nor do I see reason to dismiss entirely those of M. Corrales, Sambor, and perhaps those of Mme. d’Esperance."

In 2025, Brazilian physicist Alexandre de Carvalho Borges published an analysis on his YouTube channel of photographs from materialization séances that took place in 1890, revealing that the face of a supposed spirit was a photograph of a Hungarian theater actress. The actress was still alive at the time, thus demonstrating the impossibility of it being the spirit of a deceased person.

== Publications ==
- Shadow Land, or, Light from the Other Side (1897)
- Northern Lights, and Other Psychic Stories (1899)
