= Spraggett =

Spraggett is a surname. Notable people with the surname include:

- Allen Spraggett (1932–2022), Canadian writer and broadcaster
- Kevin Spraggett (born 1954), Canadian chess grandmaster
