= Bill Guest =

Canadian television presenter (1928–1985)

- Born: 1928; Sioux Lookout, Ontario
- Died: June 25, 1985 (aged 56–57); Winnipeg, Manitoba
- Occupation: broadcaster
- Children: William (Will)

Bill Guest (1928-1985) was best known as quizmaster of the Winnipeg edition of Reach for the Top from 1962–1985 and quizmaster of the national finals between 1969 and 1985 when the show aired on CBC Television.

Bill began his broadcasting career in 1945 at Port Arthur, Ontario radio station CKPR. In 1948 Bill moved to Winnipeg radio station CKRC, which was part of CBC Radio's secondary Dominion Network. There, he hosted several programs, including Guest in the House, Farmer Fiddlers, Pick the Hits, and the Eddy Arnold Show. Bill joined CBWT in 1958 where he co-hosted The Mary Liz Show in 1960–61, Tandem with Mary Liz Bayer in 1961, and the Winnipeg segment of summer program Vacation Time on CBC Television in 1964. He also co-hosted Prairie Profile with Marilyn Phillips. He also co-hosted the late 1970s panel show Beyond Reason with Allen Spraggett.

From 1962 to 1985, Guest hosted the Winnipeg version of high school quiz show Reach for the Top and the national finals from 1969 and 1985 when the show aired on CBC Television. In late August, 1984, Bill announced his retirement. He played the part of the station announcer in Richard Condie's 1985 animated short film, The Big Snit.

Guest died of a heart attack on June 25, 1985.

== Trivia ==
Bill Guest's grandson, Will Guest, was a contestant on Reach for the Top.
