= Hoebee =

Hoebee is a surname. Notable people with the surname include:

- José Hoebee (born 1954), Dutch singer
- Will Hoebee (1947–2012), Dutch record producer and songwriter

== See also ==
- Hoeben
