= Camp Chesterfield =

Historic Spiritualist community in Indiana, United States

- Chesterfield Spiritualist Camp District
- U.S. National Register of Historic Places
- U.S. Historic district
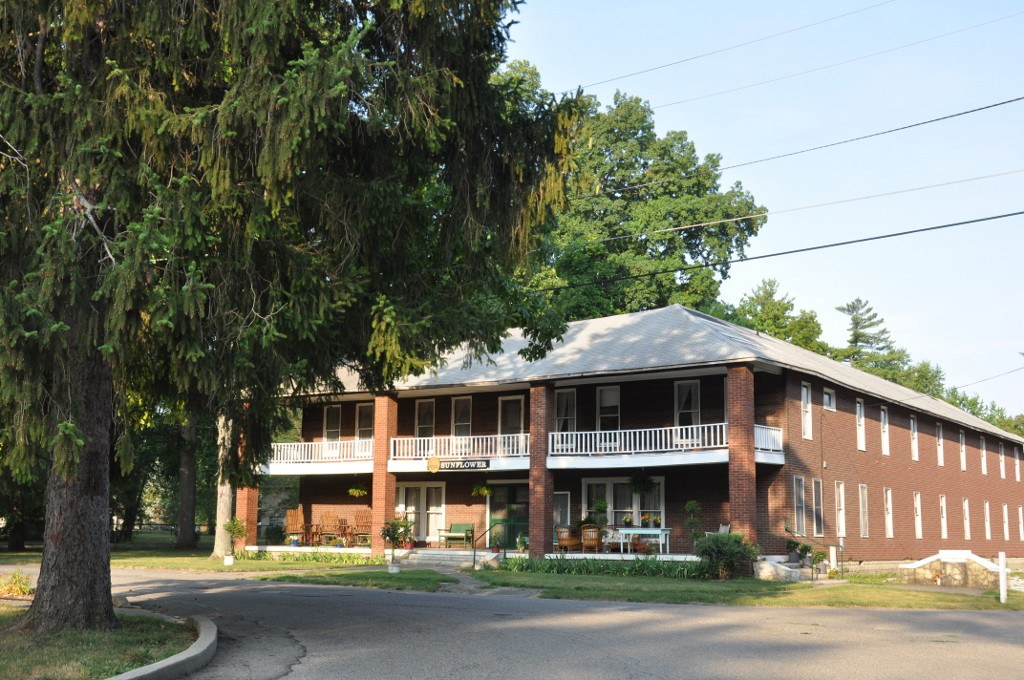
- Historic Camp Chesterfield

- Location within Indiana Location within the United States
- Location: 50 Lincoln Drive, Chesterfield, Indiana
- Coordinates: 40°6′57.276″N 85°35′48.732″W
- Area: 34.9 acres (14.1 ha)
- Built: 1886
- Architectural style: Late 19th And Early 20th Century American Movements, Art Deco
- NRHP reference No.: 02000192
- Added to NRHP: July 17, 2002

Camp Chesterfield is a spiritual center in Chesterfield, Indiana. It was founded in 1886 and is the home of the Indiana Association of Spiritualists. Camp Chesterfield offers Spiritualist Church services, seminary, and mediumship, healing, and spiritual development classes, as well as psychic readings for patrons.

In 2002, the camp was designated a historic district, the "Chesterfield Spiritualist Camp District," and listed on the National Register of Historic Places.

== History ==
In August 1925, 14 Camp Chesterfield mediums were arrested on charges of obtaining money under false pretences. The charges were filed by a news service reporter who had spent time investigating the camp.

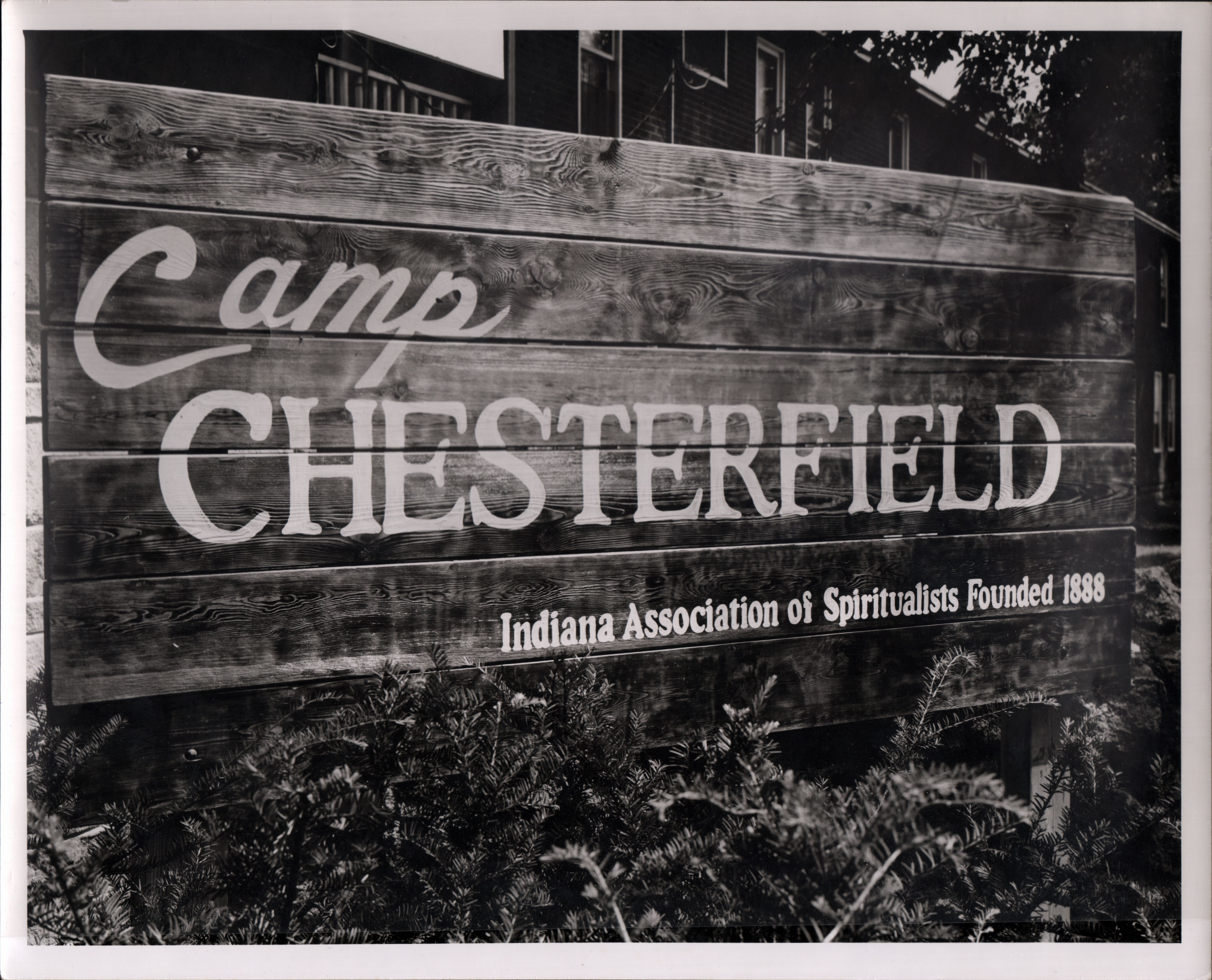
Camp Chesterfield Front Entrance Sign, ca. 1950's

In 1960, psychic investigator Andrija Puharich and Tom O'Neill, publisher of the Spiritualist magazine Psychic Observer, arranged to film two seances at Camp Chesterfield using infrared film, intending to procure scientific proof of spirit materializations. The medium was shown the camera beforehand, and was aware that she was being filmed. However, the film revealed obvious fraud on the part of the medium and her cabinet assistant. The expose was published in the 10 July 1960 issue of the Psychic Observer.

Well-known writer on paranormal topics Allen Spraggett visited the camp in 1965, and was unconvinced by the spirit materializations during seances:

"They were all barely visible. Most appeared to be swathed in white drapery, and all were the same height as the medium, and sounded exactly like her. They also exhibited abysmal ignorance of who they were supposed to be, when they had died, and other relevant details."

"This was a fraud so crude that it was an insult to the intelligence."

In 1976, M. Lamar Keene, a former medium in Florida and at Camp Chesterfield, confessed to defrauding the public in his book The Psychic Mafia "as told to" Allen Spragett. The book was also provided with a foreword by the writer William V. Rauscher. In the text Spragett and Keene detailed a multitude of common techniques utilized by fraudulent mediums since the 19th century to conjure spirits. Spragett and Keene wrote that beneath the church is a storehouse of personal data about Camp Chesterfield visitors which is collected during church service when parishioners are asked to provide their full name, the names of loved ones they wish to contact, and questions. A medium is blindfolded and claims to read the data through the help of spirit guides. The pieces of paper are not returned to the parishioners; rather, Spragett and Keene wrote, the data is shared freely amongst Camp Chesterfield mediums as well as those networked across the country for use in private hot readings.

A regular contributor to Fate magazine wrote about a grieving couple who had recently lost their child, and went to Camp Chesterfield hoping to contact their child. However, when they were requested to write down the names of those they wished to contact, they wrote down, along with their child, the names of two fictitious relatives. Later in seances those two nonexistent relatives materialized and spoke to them.

In March 2002, The Skeptical Inquirer published a sting operation performed by former magician and prominent skeptical paranormal investigator, Joe Nickell. Nickell exposed further fraud on the part of mediums at Camp Chesterfield.

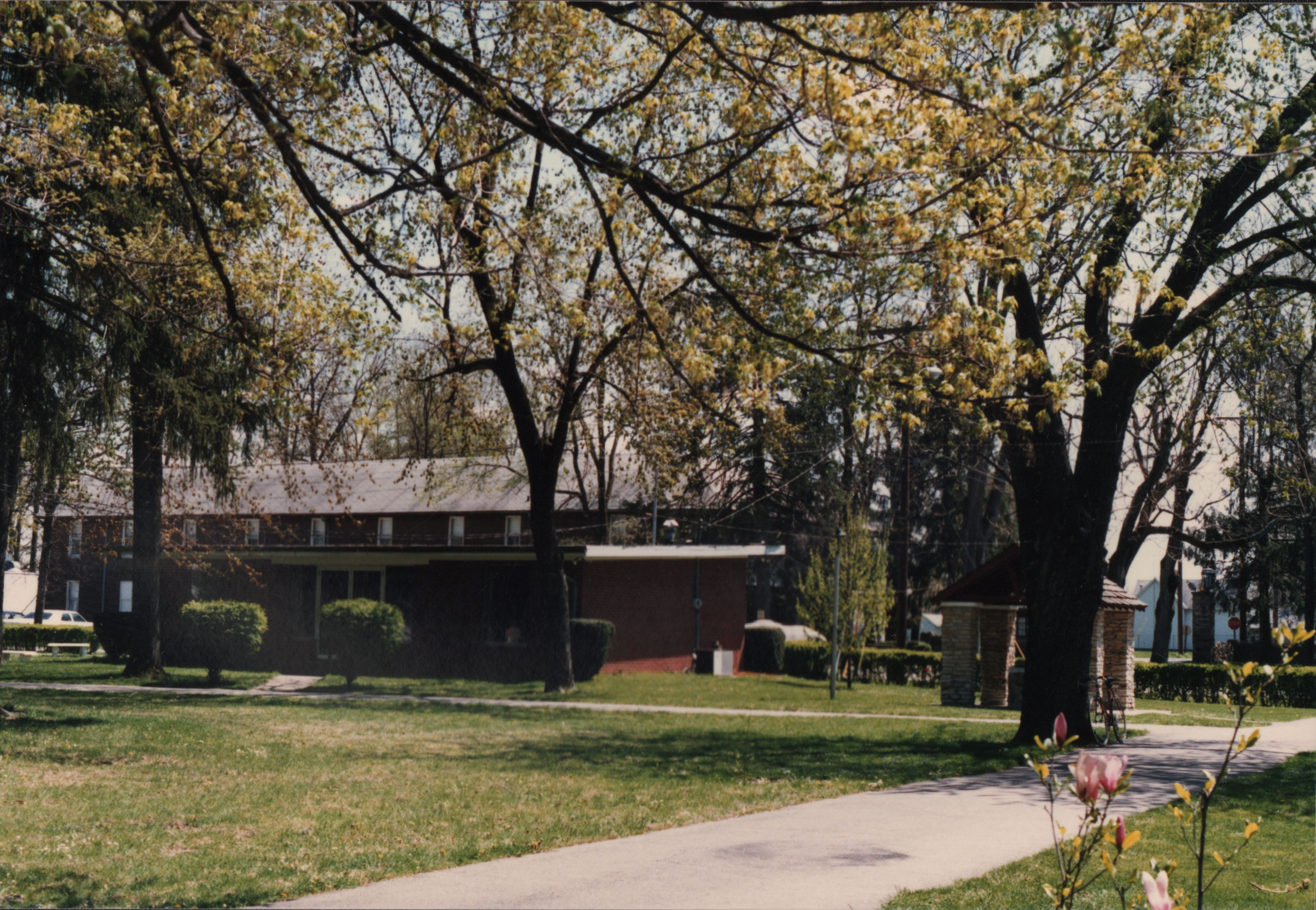
Camp Chesterfield Administration Building and Lily Hotel

== Historic district ==
Camp Chesterfield was added to the National Register of Historic places because of its significance as a Spiritualist Camp of a type that was widespread in the eastern and Midwestern United States at the start of the 19th century. As was typical for the design of these camps, it contained a common public space at its center surrounded by closely spaced residences. Simple tents and wooden summer cabins were used at Camp Chesterfield's start in 1890. Shared facilities such as a dining hall, lodging house, tent auditorium, and two seance cabins were also present. None of these structures still exist. As the movement gained in significance at the turn of the century, permanent buildings were added including a church, meeting house, and homes. Several of these buildings still exist, including a 1914 two-story hotel. The last major development phase of the camp occurred after World War II, including a 1949 hotel, 1954 cathedral, and a 1958 art gallery.

The historic site consists of 40 contributing buildings, 9 structures, and 2 objects. The structures include several stone bridges and a stone sweathouse; the objects are a Native American memorial and a totem pole.
