= Beyond Reason (game show) =

- Developed by: Allen Spraggett
- Presented by: Allen Spraggett; Bill Guest; Paul Soles (final episodes)
- Country of origin: Canada
- Original language: English

Production
- Producer: Nigel Napier-Andrews
- Running time: 30 minutes

Original release
- Network: CBC
- Release: 27 June 1977 – 10 October 1980

Beyond Reason is a television game show seen throughout Canada from 1977 to 1980. Programs featured a group of experts from various paranormal specialties attempting to find the identity of hidden visitors, resembling a combination of Front Page Challenge, What's My Line? and The Amazing World of Kreskin.

This CBC Television game show was recorded in Winnipeg. Its first season of 13 episodes began airing on 27 June 1977.

== Premise ==
In each half-hour episode, there are two rounds, each with a hidden guest. The three-member panel usually consists of an astrologer, either a palmist or a graphologist, and a clairvoyant and whose task is to determine the identity of the visiting guest. The astrologer is given only the guest's birth date and time. The palmist only sees a palm print of the guest. The graphologist is given a sample of the guest's handwriting. The clairvoyant is given one of the guest's personal items. Each panelist is seated in his or her own sound-proof booth so that they cannot communicate with each other while attempting to discover the guest's identity. Each panelist is given approximately ninety seconds to make as many statements they believe true about the hidden guest, with one point awarded for every correct assertion confirmed by the guest as true or false. They are awarded an extra twenty points if they correctly guess the guest's identity, with partial points awarded depending on how close their guess of the identity is to reality. The panelist with the most points at the end of the episode is declared the winner of that episode.

== Hosts ==
- Journalist Allen Spraggett (seasons 1–2)
- CBC announcer Bill Guest (seasons 1–2)
- Actor/comedian Paul Soles (season 3)

== Panelists ==
- Marcel Broekman (palmistry)
- Geoff Gray-Cobb (astrology)
- Irene Hughes (clairvoyance)
- Barbara Justason (astrology)
- Sandra McNeil (clairvoyance)
- Marilyn Rossner (graphology)
