= Nigel Napier-Andrews =

Canadian director and author (born 1942)

Nigel Napier-Andrews (born June 12, 1942 - March 22, 2025) was a British/Canadian TV producer, director, and author. In 2014 he became the host of the TV series Escapes with Nigel.

== Early life ==
Nigel Napier-Andrews was born in England, and spent parts of his childhood in Wimbledon, Cairo, Egypt and Benghazi, Libya. He attended Oundle School and then travelled to Kenya in 1959 to work at the Kenya Weekly News.

== Career ==
Nigel Napier-Andrews returned to England to work for the BBC, and later moved to Canada, where he subsequently switched to working for the CBC as producer and director of several television series including:

- Elwood Glover's Luncheon Date from 1969 to 1971
- the panel show This is the Law from 1972 to 1976
- The Bob McLean Show a daily interview program from 1977 to 1979 and 1982 to 1984
- the comedy series Stay Tuned in 1977
- the psychic panel show Beyond Reason from 1977 to 1980

He was director of Pierre Berton’s 26 episode half-hour television drama series Heritage Theatre in 1985 and co-executive producer of the first Gemini Awards in 1986. He subsequently worked in corporate video, event production and public relations. Until June 2009 he worked as a video producer and event planner for RBC Royal Bank. In 2012 he created the good living, food and travel blog Gentleman's Portion.

In early 2014 he hosted the first six episodes of a travel series entitled Escapes with Nigel on Bell Fibe TV1 in Southern Ontario. The series was renewed and a second series of eight episodes was shot in July and August 2014. In the winter of 2015/2016 he produced and hosted a six episode food series "Market to Table" which aired in April 2016, featuring local farmers' markets and chefs.

== Bibliography ==
- How to eat well and stay single: The bachelor's basic cookbook (1974)
- This is the Law? A Selection of Silly Laws From Around the World (1976)
- Do-it-yourself TV: A guide to community and corporate television (1990)
- Market to Table: The Cookbook (2017) eBook amazon.com
- Gentleman's Portion: The Cookbook (2020) eBook amazon.com

== Community ==
- Chairman, Visual Arts Mississauga, 1997 to 2001
- President, Performing Arts Lodges, Toronto 2005 to 2007
- Commodore, Harbour City Yacht Club, 2006 to 2008 and 2009 to 2012
