= Hoeben =

Hoeben or Hoebens is a Dutch patronymic surname derived from the archaic given name "Hoebe", a short form of Hubert. Notable people with the surname include:

- Bjorn Hoeben (born 1980), Dutch racing cyclist
- Clifton Hoeben (born 1947), Australian judge and soldier
- Piet Hein Hoebens (1948–1984), Dutch journalist, parapsychologist and skeptic
