= James Hydrick =

American stage performer and fraudster

- Born: February 28, 1959 (age 67)
- Occupation: Self-proclaimed psychic

James Alan Hydrick (born February 28, 1959) is an American former stage performer and self-described psychic.

Hydrick claimed to be able to perform acts of telekinesis, such as his trademark trick of moving a pencil resting at the edge of a table. Following a nationally televised demonstration of his abilities on That's Incredible!, he was unable to prove his supernatural abilities on That's My Line, and later confessed the fraud.

Hydrick had a long history of criminal offenses and was imprisoned at least three times, after which he escaped; his final offense was for child molestation in 1989, for which he remains in a psychiatric hospital.

== Early life ==
Hydrick was born in South Carolina to 36-year-old father Billy Hydrick and 13-year-old mother Lois Hydrick. His father was allegedly abusive. In 1989, he told an interviewer that he started learning karate at age six to protect himself from his father after seeing one of his brothers beaten to death. He and his other siblings later lived in a series of foster homes and orphanages.

Hydrick was convicted of kidnapping and torture in 1977, for which he was imprisoned. He escaped three times: he allegedly kicked through a concrete wall in a Georgia jail, broke through gates at a South Carolina prison, and finally, in 1982, he pole-vaulted over a fence at a state prison in Utah.

== Rise to fame ==
Throughout the 1970s, Hydrick was arrested repeatedly for crimes ranging from burglary to assault. Despite his difficult background and ongoing legal troubles, Hydrick gained prominence for his karate and sleight of hand tricks, earning national television exposure and a cult following. He claimed he was able to use psychokinesis to turn the pages of books and make pencils spin around on desks, among other feats. Hydrick also set up martial arts classes and claimed he could pass on the gift of psychokinesis to children through special training techniques, which was shown in 1989 to be a front for his coercing children into performing sexual favors for him, and was a factor in his conviction for sexual assault of a minor.

Hydrick's most visible demonstration of his purported skills was in an episode of the series That's Incredible! that originally aired in December 1980 and repeated in 1981. He performed the pencil-spinning trick with the host John Davidson's hand on his mouth to block him from exhaling (after Davidson suggested that he could hear Hydrick blowing). However, Hydrick had readjusted the pencil beforehand so that it was as precarious as possible and would move with the slight manipulation of his hands. He also caused a page from a telephone book to turn over, allegedly by telekinesis. Magician and paranormal skeptic James Randi awarded the program a 1980 Uri Award, later renamed the Pigasus Award, "for declaring a simple magic trick to be genuine."

== Exposure as fraud ==
James Randi replicated the pencil trick on a similar show, That's My Line, hosted by Bob Barker, demonstrating that it was a simple illusion and not a product of telekinesis. Hydrick and Randi both appeared in a follow-up episode of the show, Hydrick to demonstrate his telekinesis, while Randi was determined to prove it was only a trick. Barker and Randi offered $10,000 if Hydrick would be able to move the pages of a phone book under certain conditions. To do this, Randi placed foam peanuts on the table around the phone book to show if Hydrick was actually turning the pages by blowing on them. As Hydrick attempted to turn the page, his "powers" failed him; he claimed that the stage lights were causing the foam pieces to generate a static electric charge which, when added to the weight of the page, required more force than he was able to generate to turn the page; Randi and the judges countered that this hypothesis had no scientific basis. After 45 minutes with no results, Hydrick finally conceded his inability to complete the challenge, and the judging panel, which included a parapsychologist, declared that no supernatural phenomenon had taken place. At the end of the episode, Randi, to further discredit Hydrick, performed the same trick, openly demonstrating the blowing technique Hydrick used.

In 1981, Hydrick's so-called psychic powers were conclusively exposed as frauds by investigative journalist and professional magician Dan Korem. Hydrick confessed to Korem that he had developed his trick in prison, and that he had not learned it from a Chinese master as he originally claimed. Hydrick confessed, "My whole idea behind this in the first place was to see how dumb America was. How dumb the world is."

== Child molestation ==
Wanted on an outstanding warrant, Hydrick was apprehended after police saw him discussing psychic powers on the Sally Jessy Raphael talk show. In 1989, Hydrick was sentenced to 17 years for molesting five boys in Huntington Beach, California. After serving his sentence, he was remanded to Atascadero State Hospital for treatment under the state's sexually violent predator law. Psychologist Jesus Padilla described Hydrick as "an extremely difficult patient" who suffers from pedophilia, paraphilia, and antisocial personality disorder. Hydrick petitioned for release in May 2013, but a trial resulted in a hung jury. As of 2025, he is housed at the Coalinga State Hospital.
