= Union Township, Madison County, Indiana =

Union Township
- Township
- Location in Madison County
- Coordinates: 40°05′39″N 85°36′19″W
- Country: United States
- State: Indiana
- County: Madison
- Organized: May 3, 1830

Government
  - Type: Indiana township
  - Trustee: Timothy Dunham

Area
  - Total: 19.88 sq mi (51.5 km^{2})
  - Land: 19.81 sq mi (51.3 km^{2})
  - Water: 0.07 sq mi (0.18 km^{2}) 0.35%
- Elevation: 909 ft (277 m)

Population (2020)
  - Total: 8,887
  - Density: 449.2/sq mi (173.4/km^{2})
- ZIP codes: 46012, 46017, 47356
- GNIS feature ID: 453923
- Website: Official website

Union Township is one of fourteen townships in Madison County, Indiana, United States. As of the 2010 census, its population was 8,898 and it contained 4,004 housing units.

== History ==
Union Township was organized in 1830. It was likely named in commemoration of the federal union of the United States.

== Geography ==
According to the 2010 census, the township has a total area of 19.88 square miles (51.5 km^{2}), of which 19.81 square miles (51.3 km^{2}) (or 99.65%) is land and 0.07 square miles (0.18 km^{2}) (or 0.35%) is water.

=== Cities, towns, villages ===
- Anderson (east edge)
- Chesterfield (vast majority)

=== Cemeteries ===
The township contains these three cemeteries: Bronnenberg, Clem and Keesling.

=== Major highways ===
- Interstate 69
- State Road 32

=== Airports and landing strips ===
- Anderson Municipal Airport

== Education ==
- Anderson Community School Corporation

Union Township residents may obtain a free library card from the Anderson Public Library in Anderson.

== Political districts ==
- Indiana's 5th congressional district
- State House District 35
- State House District 37
- State Senate District 25
