= Hans Bender =

German lecturer (1907–1991)

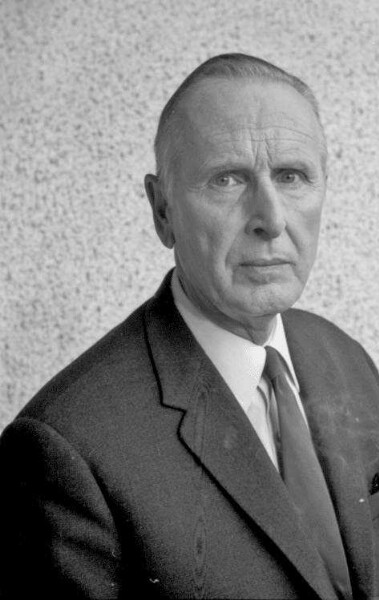
- Born: 5 February 1907; Freiburg, German Empire
- Died: 7 May 1991 (aged 84); Freiburg, Germany
- Occupation: Lecturer in parapsychology
- Spouse: Henriette Wiechert

Hans Bender (5 February 1907 – 7 May 1991) was a German lecturer on the subject of parapsychology, who was also responsible for establishing the parapsychological institute Institut für Grenzgebiete der Psychologie und Psychohygiene in Freiburg. For many years his pipe smoking, contemplative figure was synonymous with German parapsychology. He was an investigator of 'unusual human experience', e.g. poltergeists and clairvoyants. One of his most famous cases was the Rosenheim Poltergeist.

== Life ==
After his secondary school examination in 1925, he studied law in Lausanne and Paris. In 1927, he started to study psychology, philosophy, and Romance studies in Freiburg, Heidelberg, and Berlin. From 1929, he studied in psychology in Bonn with Erich Rothacker and Romance studies with Ernst Robert Curtius. He took the doctors degree 1933 by Rothacker with the dissertation Psychische Automatismen. At the time he was an assistant at the Psychological Institute of the University of Bonn, he studied medicine in parallel to the controversial psychology to get a better reputation. His claim to have made his a state examination for a PhD in medicine by professor Kurt Beringer on the subject of "Die Arbeitskurve unter Pervitin" remained a claim, as he was not able to present the promotion certificate. To eliminate this problem, he drew up a new medical dissertation at old age.

In 1939, he worked as a volunteer at the Psychiatric and Intern Clinic in Freiburg. As he was unfit for the military service, he could act in place of his drafted professor Rothacker in 1940 in Bonn. From September of this year on, he also worked at the Internal Clinic in Bonn. In June, he married Henriette Wiechert, who was "starring" as the experimental subject with the nicknames "Miss Dora D." or "Miss D." in his dissertation.

In order to have a successful career, Bender had already joined the NSDAP at that time. To be able to call himself an associate professor at the newly founded Reichsuniversität Straßburg, he was habilitated in 1941 with the treatise on the subject "Experimentelle Visionen. Ein Beitrag zum Problem der Sinnestäuschung, des Realitätsbewusstseins und der Schichten der Persönlichkeit". With the intervention of the historian Ernst Anrich, he became from the Reichsministerium for Sciences, Education and public instruction the necessary lectureship. From 1942 to 1944, he taught psychology and clinical psychology, also managing the Paracelsus Institute, where Bender originally planned to make research on the subject of astrology. At the request of his patron Friedrich Spieser, he studied the subject of dowsing.

After his detention in a British camp between November 1944 and July 1945, he returned to Freiburg im Breisgau, where he was got a lectureship for psychology. In 1950, he founded the non-university Institute for Frontier Areas of Psychology and Mental Health.

From 1946 to 1949, he acted for the Chair for Psychology and Pedagogy and was a Diätendozent afterwards. After he made guest professorships in 1951 and 1954, he was appointed as an extraordinary professor for frontier areas of psychology. In 1967, he became a full professor for psychology and frontier areas of psychology. One quarter of subjects were issues of parapsychology. In 1975, he became professor emeritus.

When journalists of the SPIEGEL magazine found out in 1977 that no copy of his medical dissertation could be found, and that Bender also could not produce a promotion certificate, the district attorney brought a procedure because of assuming a false title. To avoid prosecution, Bender promoted again by Manfred Müller-Küppers, with whom he had co-operated in cases of haunting.

== Research and activities ==
Bender had been skilled in depth psychology and oriented himself mostly by approaches of Pierre Janet and Carl Gustav Jung. From this, it follows that on the one hand, he used mostly a qualitative approach instead of a quantitative one. On the other hand, he held an "animistic" approach in parapsychology instead of a "spiritualistic" one. In parapsychology this means that paranormal phenomena were not treated as influences of spirits, but as a result of the great strain of the "focus person". Because of this approach concerning parapsychological phenomena, he associated the experiments of a sensitive approach with the analysis of an affective approach to parapsychology and neurotic faulty attitudes.

A term coined by Bender is the so-called uniformity of the occult (in German, Gleichförmigkeit des Okkulten), i.e. the fact that phenomena such as telepathy, clairvoyance, precognition, haunting and psychokinesis are reported from antiquity to the present in all epochs and in the most diverse cultures and regions of the earth, while age, educational level and social status of the experiencers do not seem to play a role. The parapsychic phenomena thus seem to be similar or uniform across historical, cultural, geographical and personal boundaries. Bender considered this to be proof that it was not myths and traditions without correspondence in objective reality that were present here, but individual, actual experiences of the individual observers, which were based on objective, even if still unknown, characteristics of reality.

Another feature of his work was his close contact with astrologers, such as Thomas Ring, a friend of his. He was consulting him in astrology both in private and scientific matters. Beside this, he was convinced that his wife had a telepathic connection to him. Seeing in case of doubt in apparently unexplainable experiences something paranormal brought him into criticism. This was not only because of his specialty or his close relation to the mass media, but also his assistants occasional observance that he was not always making thorough research. As an example, he explained in 1982 the haunting case "Chopper" that was proven to be a manipulation of a dental nurse in Neutraubling near to Regensburg headily as authentic to the magazine Die Aktuelle.

Already before the Chopper case, his critics accused him of having overlooked manipulation attempts of his focus persons. In 1978, for example, the detective director Herbert Schäfer of the State Criminal Police Office in Bremen obtained a confession from Heinrich Scholz, the focus person in a haunting case of 1965, which Bender had declared to be genuine. According to the confession, the then apprentice of a Bremen porcelain store had deliberately manipulated not only all the haunting phenomena in the store, but also in the subsequent investigation in Bender's Freiburg laboratory. Bender's assistants countered with expert reports that were meant to prove that at least some of the manipulations described by Scholz could not have taken place.

The problem of manipulations also exists in the most known haunting case of Bender, "the haunting of Rosenheim", that occurred in an attorney's chancellery between 1967 and 1968. This case was not only documented by Bender and his assistants, but by technicians of the Post Office and the power plant, by the police and physicists of the Max Planck Institute in Munich. Notwithstanding the fact that the physicists wrote in their expert opinion that not all the phenomena observed could be explained with the laws of physics, at least in one case, a manipulation of the focus person, a clerk, could be detected. Bender and his assistants explained the case such that the often psychologically labile focus persons manipulate in order to have the focus of attention, when the real parapsychological phenomena fail to appear.

== Critical reception ==
Dutch journalist and skeptic Piet Hein Hoebens has criticized Bender's investigation claims of the Rosenheim Poltergeist, saying that "No full report of the investigations has ever been published, so we are in no position to check to what extent the parapsychologists have been successful in excluding naturalistic explanations." Hoebens wrote that Bender's accounts of his investigation show that he may not have made a rigorous enough examination of the evidence, which Hoebens deems highly questionable.

Skeptical investigator Joe Nickell described Bender as a paranormal believer unwilling "to draw the obvious conclusion from the evidence." Nickell noted that Bender considered a poltergeist case to have genuine effects even though the subject was discovered to have cheated. According to Nickell "this approach contrasts with that of skeptical investigators who consider one instance of deceit to discredit an entire case".

According to magician and paranormal investigator James Randi, due to "his unquestioning acceptance of psi, Bender came in for a great deal of criticism from his colleagues in science, who referred to him as der Spukprofessor ("spook professor")". Bender was later found to have lied about having a doctorate, in addition to ignoring evidence and exaggerating his own observations on psi.

== Publications (selection) ==
- "Zum Problem der außersinnlichen Wahrnehmung. Ein Beitrag zur Untersuchung des Hellsehens mit Laboratoriumsmethoden", in Zeitschrift für Psychologie 135 (1939), pp. 20–130.
- Psychische Automatismen. Zur Experimentalpsychologie des Unterbewußten und der außersinnlichen Wahrnehmung, Leipzig, 1936.
- "Der Okkultismus als Problem der Psychohygiene", in Neue Wissenschaft 1 (1950), H. 3, pp. 34–42.
- "Zur Entwicklung der Parapsychologie von 1930–1950", in Hans Driesch's Parapsychologie. Die Wissenschaft von den "okkulten" Erscheinungen, Zurich, 1952, pp. 135–176.
- "Okkultismus als seelische Gefahr", in M. Pfister-Amende (ed.): Geistige Hygiene. Forschung und Gefahr, Basel 1955, pp. 489–499.
- "Praekognition im qualitativen Experiment. Zur Methodik der "Platzexperimente" mit dem Sensitiven Gerard Croiset", in Zeitschrift für Parapsychologie und Grenzgebiete der Psychologie 1 (1957), pp. 5–35.
- "Parapsychische Phänomene als wissenschaftliche Grenzfrage", in Freiburger Dies Universitatis 6 (1957/58), pp. 59–84.
- "Mediumistische Psychosen. Ein Beitrag zur Pathologie spiritistischer Praktiken", in the Zeitschrift für Parapsychologie und Grenzgebiete der Psychologie 2 (1958/1959), pp. 173–200.
- "Zur Frage des telepathischen Traumes", in H. Thomae, H. (ed.): Bericht über den 22. Kongreß der Deutschen Gesellschaft für Psychologie, Göttingen, 1960, pp. 276–280.
- (with J. Mischo): "'Precognition' in dream series I", in Zeitschrift für Parapsychologie und Grenzgebiete der Psychologie 4 (1960/61), pp. 114–198.
- (with J. Mischo): "'Precognition' in dream series II", in Zeitschrift für Parapsychologie und Grenzgebiete der Psychologie 5 (1961), pp. 10–47.
- "Formen der Einstellung zur Parapsychologie", in Zeitschrift für Parapsychologie und Grenzgebiete der Psychologie 7 (1964), pp. 85–92.
- "Astrologie und Aberglaube", in Neue Wissenschaft 12 (1964), H. 1, pp. 1–23.
- "Erich Rothacker 1888–1965", in Zeitschrift für Parapsychologie und Grenzgebiete der Psychologie 9 (1966), 149f.
- "Neue Entwicklungen in der Spukforschung", in Zeitschrift für Parapsychologie und Grenzgebiete der Psychologie 12 (1966), pp. 1–18.
- "Telepathie und Hellsehen als wissenschaftliche Grenzfragen", in Schopenhauer-Jahrbuch auf das Jahr 1967, pp. 36–52.
- (with J. Mischo): A prosecutor confronted with "weirdness" in Zeitschrift für Parapsychologie und Grenzgebiete der Psychologie 12 (1970), pp. 255–259.
- (Ed.): Parapsychologie - Development, Results, and Problems, Darmstadt 1974.
- "Psychohygienische und forensische Aspekte der Parapsychologie", in G. Condreau (ed.): Die Psychologie des 20. Jahrhunderts, Bd. 15, Zürich 1979, pp. 651–672.
- "W.H.C. Tenhaeff (1894–1980)", in Zeitschrift für Parapsychologie und Grenzgebiete der Psychologie 23 (1981), pp. 231–236.
- Telepathy, second sight, and psychokinesis, Munich 1983.
- Dealings with the Occult, Freiburg 1984.
- "A positive critic of superstition", in R. Pilkington (ed.): The Men and Women of Parapsychology, Jefferson, N.C. 1987, pp. 114–118.

== See also ==
- C. T. K. Chari
