= George Makepeace House =

Historic house in Indiana, United States

- U.S. National Register of Historic Places
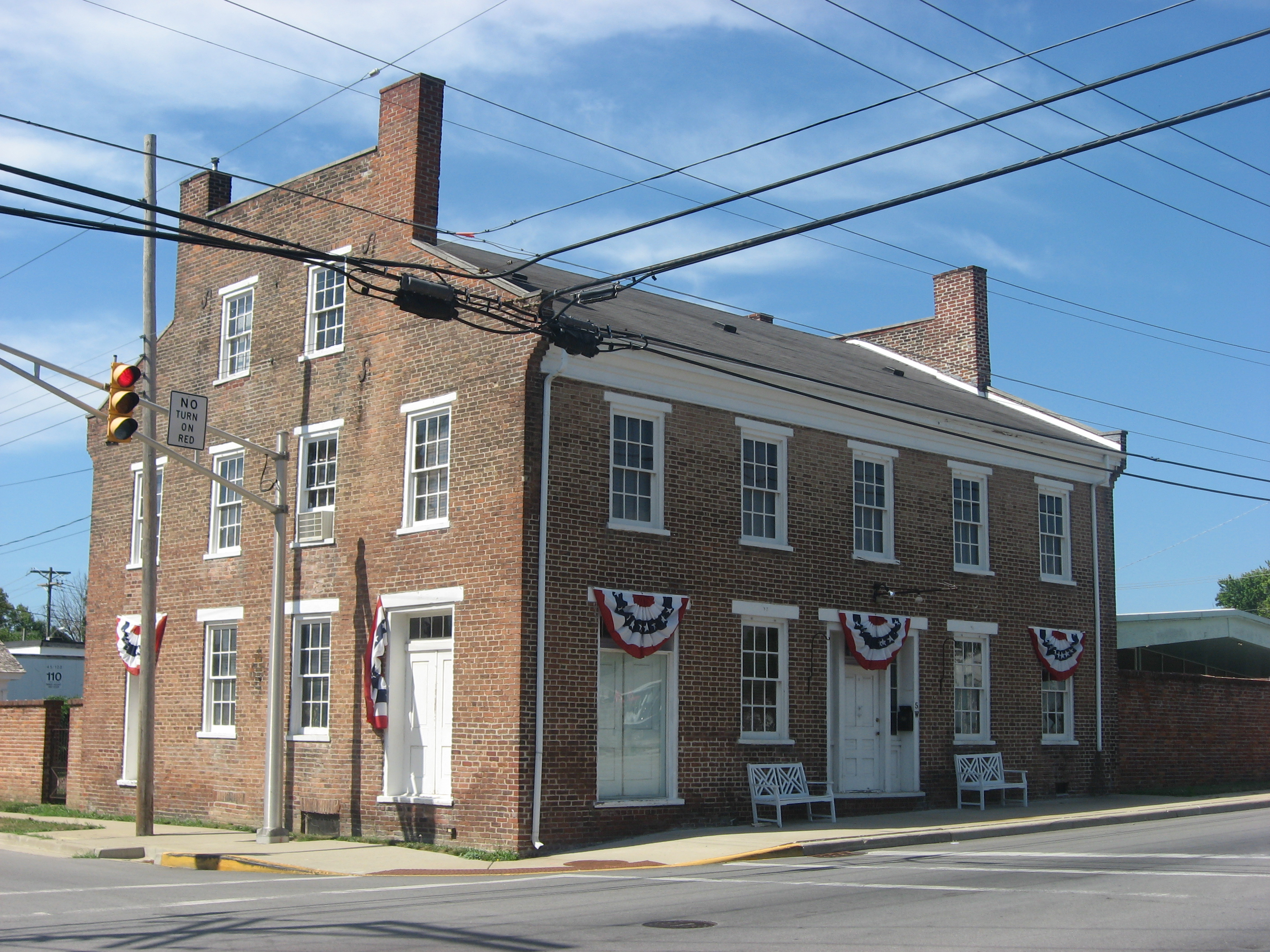
- George Makepeace House, July 2012

- Location within Indiana Location within the United States
- Location: 5 W. Main St., Chesterfield, Indiana
- Coordinates: 40°6′48″N 85°35′45″W
- Area: less than one acre
- Built: 1850
- Architectural style: Federal
- NRHP reference No.: 85000596
- Added to NRHP: March 21, 1985

George Makepeace House, also known as the Makepeace-Cornelius-McCallister House, is a historic home located at Chesterfield, Indiana. It was built in 1850, and is a 2 1/2-story, five-bay, rectangular, Federal style brick commercial / residential building. It has a side-gable roof and two paired brick chimneys at each end.

It was listed in the National Register of Historic Places in 1985.
