= Alexander Aksakov =

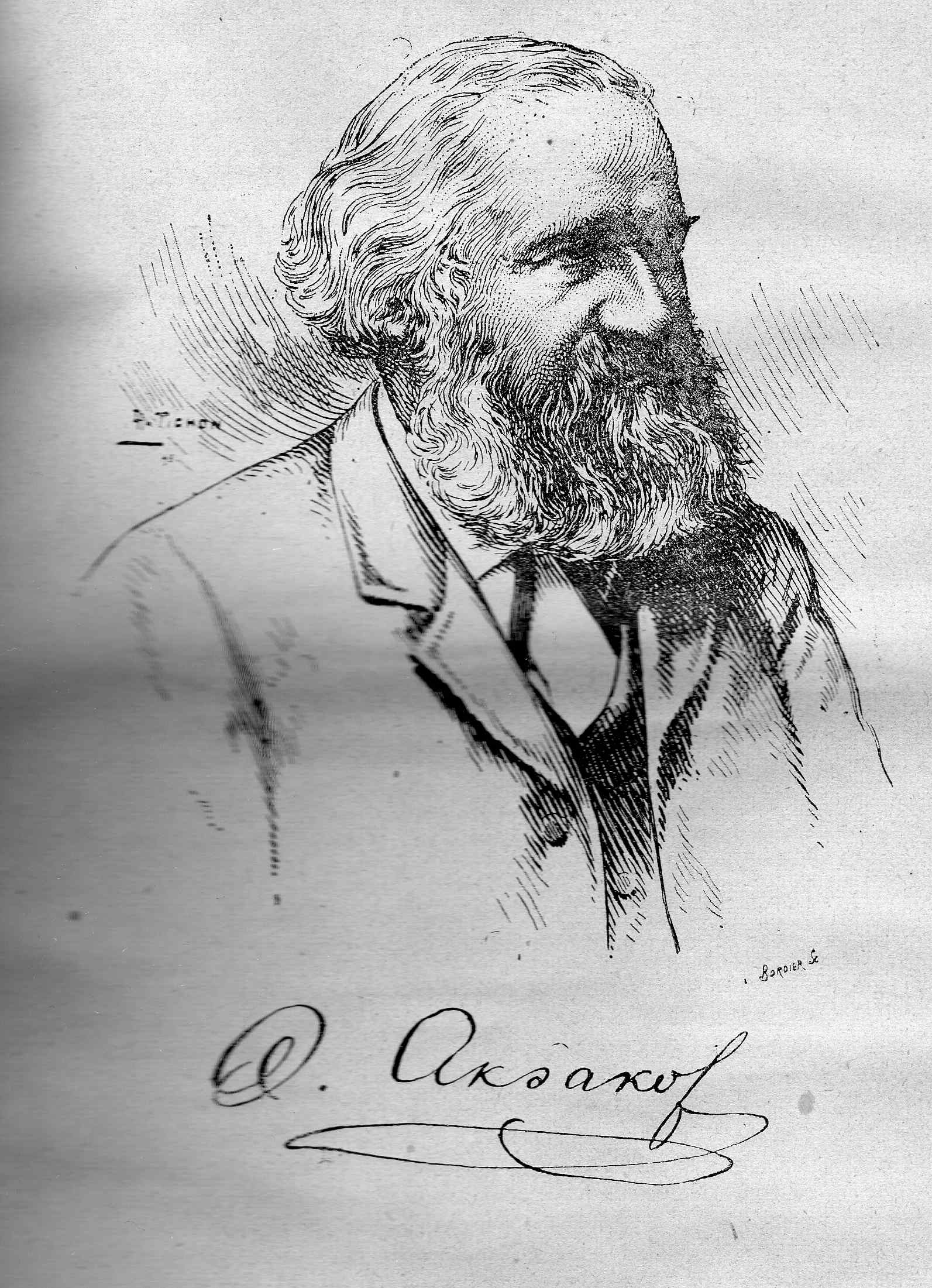
- A signed portrait of Alexandr Aksakov. 1906
- Born: Алекса́ндр Никола́евич Акса́ков; 27 May 1832 village Repyovka, Gorodishche Uyezd, Penza Governorate, Russian Empire
- Died: 4 January 1903 (aged 70); Saint Petersburg, Russian Empire
- Occupations: writer, translator, journalist, editor, psychic researcher
- Years active: 1850s-1903

Alexandr Nikolayevich Aksakov (Алекса́ндр Никола́евич Акса́ков; 27 May 1832 – 4 January 1903) was a Russian writer, translator, journalist, editor, state official and psychic researcher, who is credited with having coined the term "telekinesis". While living in Germany with his wife and publishing his writings there, he began to spell his name as Alexander Aksakof to accommodate the German spelling style, and this is the name by which he is most known outside of Russia.

== Biography ==
Alexandr Nikolayevich Aksakov was born in Penza Governorate, to the landlord Nikolai T. Aksakov, nephew of the writer Sergey Aksakov. His wife's name was Sophie.

In 1851, having graduated from the Tsarskoye Selo Lyceum, Aksakov joined the Russian Imperial Ministry of Internal Affairs. In 1852 as a member of Melnikov-Pecherskiy's expedition he traveled to the Nizhny Novgorod region to investigate the case of the local Old Believers movement. In 1858 Nizhny Novgorod's governor A. N. Muravyov (one of the original Decembrists) invited Aksakov to join the local government's Office for the State Properties an adviser for its Economic division. In 1868-1878 Aksakov served as a member of His Imperial Majesty's Own Chancellery and retired as a state councillor which gave him the right to be addressed as "your Excellency".

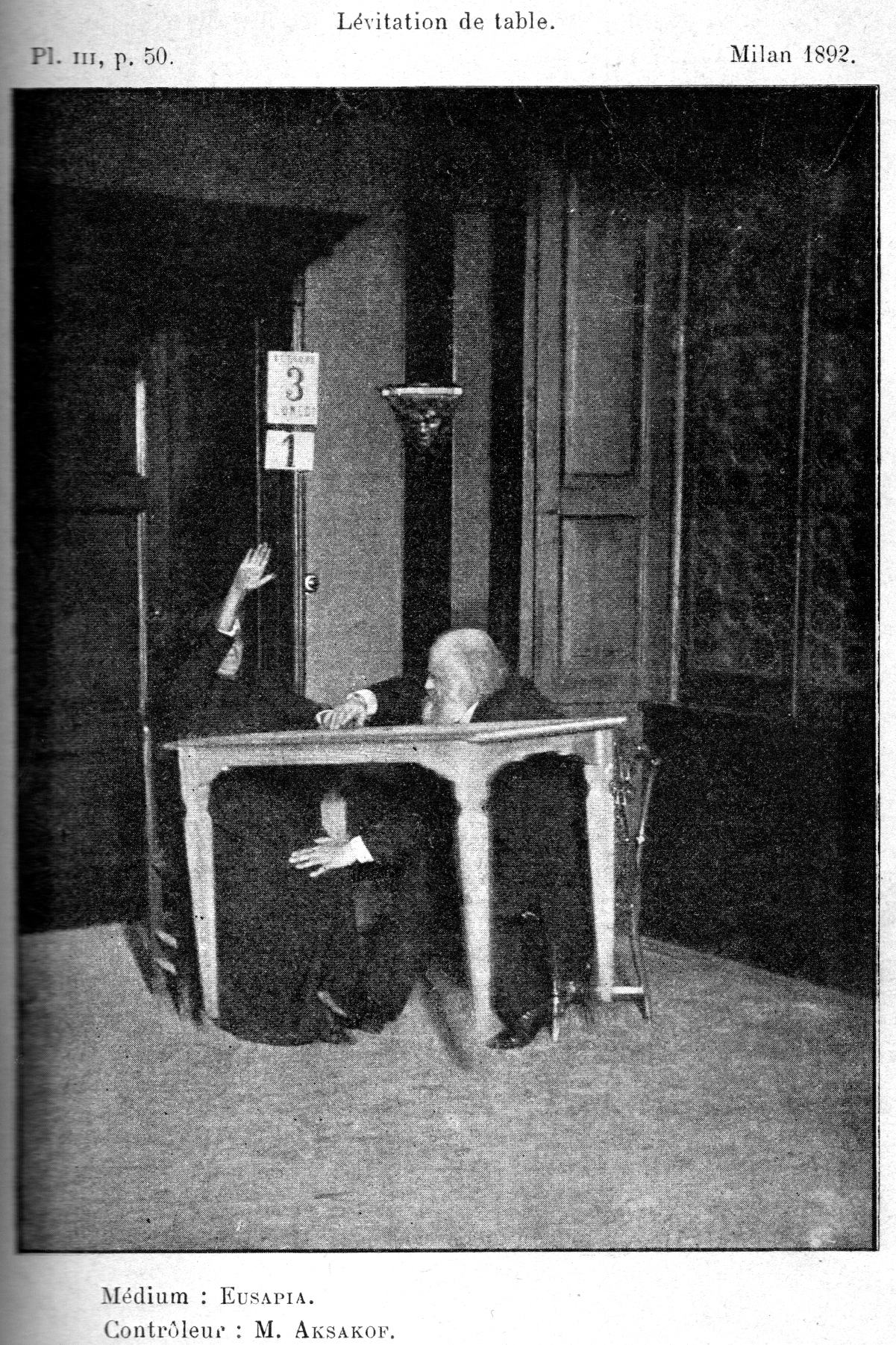
Aksakov (right) monitors for fraud while medium Eusapia Palladino "levitates" a table, Milan, 1892.

As a student Aksakov was greatly impressed by the works of Emanuel Swedenborg. This led to an all-consuming interest in mediumship, specifically in its physical manifestations. In 1863 he translated Swedenborg's Heaven and Hell (De Caelo et Ejus Mirabilibus et de inferno. Ex Auditis et Visis) from Latin into Russian, under the title "About Heaven, Universe and Hell as it's been seen and heard by E. Swedenborg". In Leipzig he published his own books "Gospel According to Swedenborg" (1864), "Swedenborg's Rationalism: The Critical Analysis of his Study of the Holy Bible" (1870) and "The Book of Genesis according to Swedenborg" (1870), which were praised by Fyodor Dostoyevsky and Nikolai Leskov.

In the late 1860s Aksakov became famous as one of the organizers (along with professor Aleksandr Butlerov and zoologist and writer Nikolai Wagner) of the first séances in Russia. He continued to translate major spiritualist works, including those of Andrew Jackson Davis (both into Russian and German). In 1874 he started editing the spiritualist monthly Psychische Studien based in Leipzig. His best known works on the subject, Animism and Spiritism (Анимизм и спиритизм), was published in 1893. (Note: This book is a critical study of the work by Eduard von Hartmann Der Spiritismus (1885).)

In Europe, Aksakov became known for his study the case of the British medium Mme. d'Esperance, whom he later praised as an honest, sincere and mysteriously gifted person. This side of his work has been well documented in Arthur Conan Doyle's "The History of Spiritualism". Aksakov also investigated psychic medium Eusapia Palladino and has been credited with being the first to use the term telekinesis.

Alexandr Aksakov wrote on the great variety of subjects, the most controversial of which was the nature and history of Russian drinking habits. His articles and essays appearing regularly in Day (День) magazine edited by Ivan Aksakov.

He died in Saint Petersburg, aged 70.

== Books ==
- Александр Аксаков. Анимизм и спиритизм. Animism and Spiritism by A. Aksakov (in Russian)
