= That's My Line =

- Created by: Mark Goodson
- Directed by: Lawrence Einhorn
- Presented by: Bob Barker
- Starring: Suzanne Childs; Tiiu Leek; Kerry Millerick
- Announcer: Johnny Olson
- Country of origin: United States
- No. of seasons: 2

Production
- Production company: Mark Goodson-Bill Todman Productions

Original release
- Network: CBS
- Release: August 9, 1980 – April 11, 1981

That's My Line is a summer CBS reality television series developed by Mark Goodson. Conceived in response to the success of NBC's Real People and ABC's That's Incredible!, That's My Line borrowed its name from one of Goodson and Bill Todman's earlier productions, the panel game What's My Line?, and shared its central conceit of highlighting average people with unusual occupations. Unlike the earlier show, That's My Line had no panel or game components, instead being centered around interviews and demonstrations. The series ran as a summer replacement series for two abbreviated seasons in 1980 and 1981.

It was hosted by Bob Barker and announced by Johnny Olson, both associated with Goodson-Todman's hit game show, The Price Is Right (Olson had also been the What's My Line? announcer for many years). The series was co-hosted by Suzanne Childs and Tiiu Leek, and joined during the 1981 run by Kerry Millerick. The thrust of the show during the 1981 season also changed from unusual occupations to an emphasis on the funny, bizarre, or ridiculous.

Notable moments included voice artist Mel Blanc having a contest with an audience member on who does voice acting the best (the "audience member" being his son Noel) and magician James Randi contesting James Hydrick's psychic abilities.
