= Prairie Profile =

- Genre: Documentary
- Narrated by: Bill Guest; Marilyn Phillips; Mike Winlaw
- Country of origin: Canada
- Original language: English
- No. of seasons: 1
- No. of episodes: 15

Production
- Running time: 30 minutes

Original release
- Network: CBC Television
- Release: 3 January – 11 April 1965

Prairie Profile is a Canadian documentary television series that aired on CBC Television in 1965.

== Premise ==
Historic and biographical films about Manitoba and Saskatchewan were featured during this series.

== Scheduling ==
This half-hour series was broadcast on Sundays at 1:00 p.m. (Eastern) from 3 January to 11 April 1965.
