= Chesterfield, Indiana =

- Town
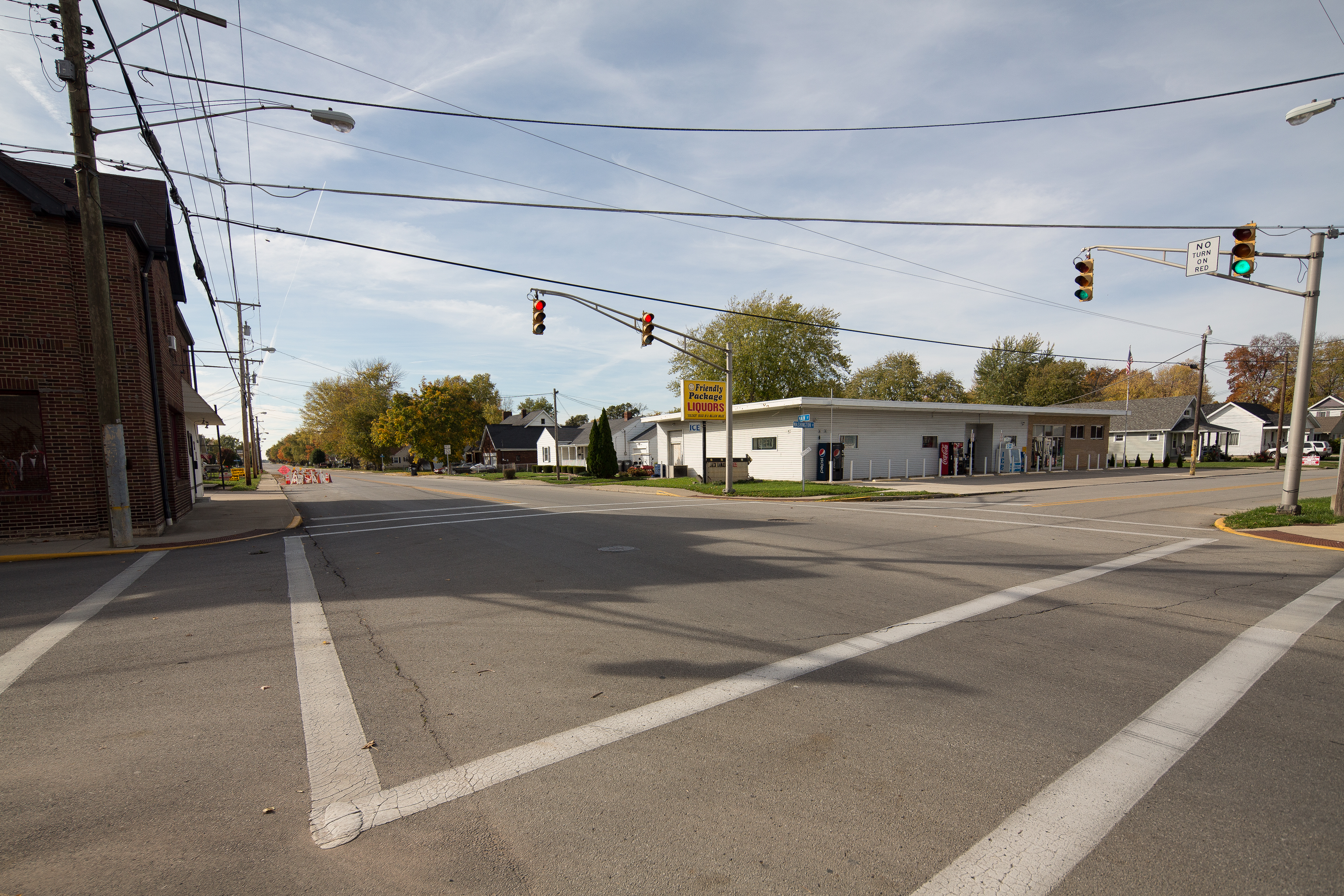
- Intersection of Main Street and Washington Street

- Logo
- Motto: "A Progressive Community"
- Location in Madison and Delaware counties, Indiana
- Coordinates: 40°06′47″N 85°35′40″W
- Country: United States
- State: Indiana
- Counties: Madison, Delaware
- Townships: Union, Salem
- Established: 1830
- Renamed: 1834
- Incorporated: March 11, 1858

Area
  - Total: 1.37 sq mi (3.54 km^{2})
  - Land: 1.37 sq mi (3.54 km^{2})
  - Water: 0 sq mi (0.00 km^{2})
- Elevation: 899 ft (274 m)

Population (2020)
  - Total: 2,490
  - Estimate (2025): 2,519 ▲
  - Density: 1,819.5/sq mi (702.51/km^{2})
- Time zone: UTC−5 (EST)
  - Summer (DST): UTC−5 (EST)
- ZIP Code: 46017
- Area code: 765
- FIPS code: 18-12376
- GNIS feature ID: 2396641
- Website: chesterfield.in.gov

Chesterfield is a town in the U.S. state of Indiana which lies in Union Township, Madison County, and Salem Township, Delaware County. The population was 2,490 at the 2020 census. It is part of the Indianapolis–Carmel–Anderson metropolitan statistical area.

== History ==
Chesterfield, originally "West Union", was platted by Amasa Makepeace in 1830. It was renamed Chesterfield in 1834.

On March 11, 1858, Chesterfield was officially incorporated as a town.

The Chesterfield Spiritualist Camp District and George Makepeace House are listed in the National Register of Historic Places.

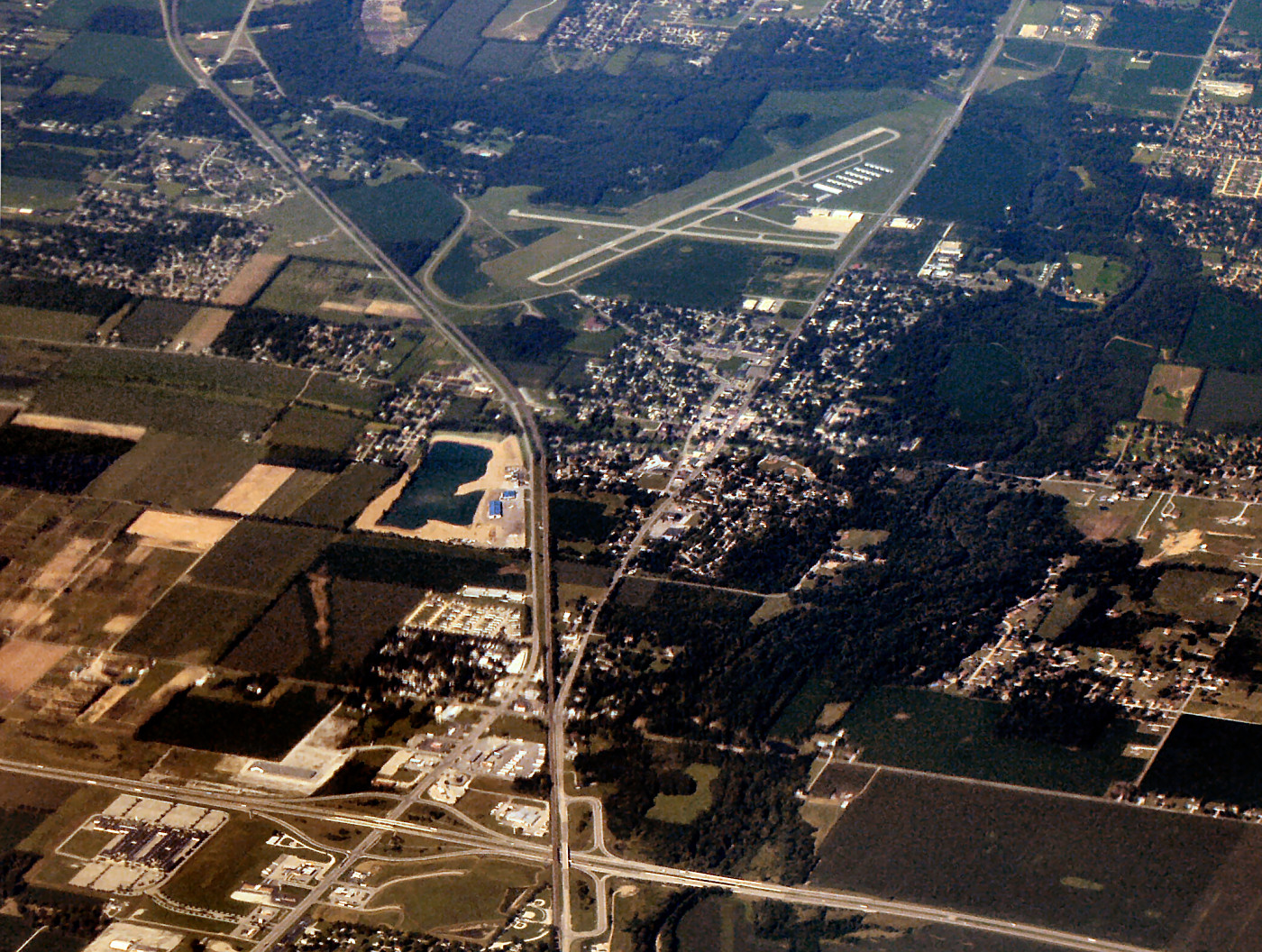
Aerial view of Chesterfield facing southwest

== Geography ==
Chesterfield is located in eastern Madison County with a small portion extending east into southwestern Delaware County. It is bordered to the west by the city of Anderson, the Madison county seat, and to the east by the town of Daleville.

Indiana State Road 32 passes through Chesterfield as its Main Street, leading west into Anderson and northeast through Daleville 13 miles (21 km) to Muncie. Interstate 69 passes just east of the Chesterfield town limits, with access from Exit 234 (SR 67). I-69 leads southwest 44 miles (71 km) to Indianapolis and north 76 miles (122 km) to Fort Wayne. The White River flows east to west along the northern border of the town.

According to the U.S. Census Bureau, Chesterfield has a total area of 1.37 square miles (3.55 km^{2}), all land.

== Demographics ==
Historical population
Census	Pop.	Note	%±
1870	203		—
1880	150		−26.1%
1910	285		—
1920	319		11.9%
1930	460		44.2%
1940	581		26.3%
1950	1,086		86.9%
1960	2,588		138.3%
1970	3,001		16.0%
1980	2,701		−10.0%
1990	2,730		1.1%
2000	2,969		8.8%
2010	2,547		−14.2%
2020	2,490		−2.2%
2025 (est.)	2,519	▲	1.2%
U.S. Decennial Census

=== 2020 census ===
As of the 2020 census, Chesterfield had a population of 2,490, with 1,098 households and 404 families living in the town. The population density was 1,817.5 inhabitants per square mile (701.7/km^{2}). There were 1,225 housing units at an average density of 894.2 per square mile (345.3/km^{2}). The median age was 40.3 years; 5.7% of residents were under age 5, 21.1% were under age 18, and 19.4% were age 65 or older. For every 100 females there were 89.6 males, and for every 100 females age 18 and over there were 85.9 males age 18 and over.

100.0% of residents lived in urban areas, while 0.0% lived in rural areas.

There were 1,098 households, of which 26.8% had children under the age of 18 living in them. Of all households, 36.6% were married-couple households, 21.1% were households with a male householder and no spouse or partner present, and 33.2% were households with a female householder and no spouse or partner present. About 35.6% of all households were made up of individuals, and 13.5% had someone living alone who was 65 years of age or older. The average household size was 2.27 and the average family size was 3.06.

There were 1,225 housing units, of which 10.4% were vacant (127 units) at a density of 92.7 per square mile (35.8/km^{2}). The homeowner vacancy rate was 1.6% and the rental vacancy rate was 2.8%.

Racial composition as of the 2020 census
Race	Number	Percent
White	2,272	91.2%
Black or African American	31	1.2%
American Indian and Alaska Native	0	0.0%
Asian	14	0.6%
Native Hawaiian and Other Pacific Islander	0	0.0%
Some other race	28	1.1%
Two or more races	145	5.8%
Hispanic or Latino (of any race)	65	2.6%

=== Demographic estimates ===
31.7% of the population had never been married. 47.1% of residents were married and not separated, 7.6% were widowed, 12.9% were divorced, and 0.7% were separated. 13.2% of the population were veterans.

The most common language spoken at home was English with 97.3% speaking it at home, 2.5% spoke Spanish at home and 0.2% spoke an Asian or Pacific Islander language at home. 1.3% of the population were foreign born.

=== Income and poverty ===
The median household income in Chesterfield was $44,219, 21.3% less than the median average for the state of Indiana. 14.1% of the population were in poverty, including 24.8% of residents under the age of 18. The poverty rate for the town was 1.2% higher than that of the state.

21.3% of the population was disabled and 10.9% had no healthcare coverage. 48.9% of the population had attained a high school or equivalent degree, 21.0% had attended college but received no degree, 11.5% had attained an Associate's degree or higher, 8.1% had attained a Bachelor's degree or higher, and 4.9% had a graduate or professional degree. 5.6% had no degree.

54.3% of Chesterfield residents were employed, working a mean of 38.6 hours per week. The median gross rent in Chesterfield was $887 and the homeownership rate was 64.6%.

=== 2010 census ===
As of the census of 2010, there were 2,547 people, 1,090 households, and 663 families living in the town. The population density was 1,929.5 inhabitants per square mile (745.0/km^{2}). There were 1,275 housing units at an average density of 965.9 per square mile (372.9/km^{2}). The racial makeup of the town was 97.4% White, 0.4% African American, 0.2% Native American, 0.7% Asian, 0.1% from other races, and 1.3% from two or more races. Hispanic or Latino of any race were 1.1% of the population.

There were 1,090 households, of which 31.5% had children under the age of 18 living with them, 41.3% were married couples living together, 13.6% had a female householder with no husband present, 6.0% had a male householder with no wife present, and 39.2% were non-families. 32.7% of all households were made up of individuals, and 11.8% had someone living alone who was 65 years of age or older. The average household size was 2.28 and the average family size was 2.89.

The median age in the town was 39.5 years. 22.8% of residents were under the age of 18; 8.2% were between the ages of 18 and 24; 25.5% were from 25 to 44; 26.3% were from 45 to 64; and 17.3% were 65 years of age or older. The gender makeup of the town was 48.5% male and 51.5% female.

=== 2000 census ===
As of the census of 2000, there were 2,969 people, 1,269 households, and 808 families living in the town. The population density was 2,586.5 inhabitants per square mile (998.7/km^{2}). There were 1,365 housing units at an average density of 1,189.1 per square mile (459.1/km^{2}). The racial makeup of the town was 98.42% White, 0.40% African American, 0.10% Native American, 0.30% Asian, 0.30% from other races, and 0.47% from two or more races. Hispanic or Latino of any race were 1.38% of the population.

There were 1,269 households, out of which 31.3% had children under the age of 18 living with them, 48.3% were married couples living together, 11.4% had a female householder with no husband present, and 36.3% were non-families. 30.8% of all households were made up of individuals, and 11.6% had someone living alone who was 65 years of age or older. The average household size was 2.30 and the average family size was 2.87.

In the town, the population was spread out, with 24.2% under the age of 18, 8.5% from 18 to 24, 29.9% from 25 to 44, 22.5% from 45 to 64, and 14.9% who were 65 years of age or older. The median age was 36 years. For every 100 females, there were 87.7 males. For every 100 females age 18 and over, there were 84.3 males.

The median income for a household in the town was $37,143, and the median income for a family was $47,222. Males had a median income of $35,412 versus $22,966 for females. The per capita income for the town was $18,738. About 2.9% of families and 5.9% of the population were below the poverty line, including 5.9% of those under age 18 and 7.5% of those age 65 or over.

== Transportation ==
Chesterfield is served by a variety of major roads.

- Interstate 69 (exit 34)
- State Road 32
- State Road 67
- State Road 232

== Education ==
The portion in Madison County (that is, the vast majority of the municipality) is in the Anderson Community School Corporation. That district's comprehensive high school is Anderson High School.

The portion of Chesterfield in Delaware County is in the Daleville Community Schools school district. That district's comprehensive high school is Daleville High School.
