= Thomas Ring (astrologer) =

German painter

Thomas Karl Ring (28 November 1892 – 24 August 1983) was a German astrologer, painter and writer. He was born in Nuremberg and died in Schaerding, Austria.

== Early life and education ==
Thomas Ring was born at five o'clock in the afternoon on the 28 November 1892 in the village Muggenhof near Nuremberg. His father Nikodemus Ring was a German engineer from Warsaw, his mother Margarethe Ring was a descendant from a family of shoemakers and peasants. His early childhood was marked by several changes of locations, the family lived in Austria, Switzerland, the Netherlands and England before his father was involved in the establishment of a bicycle workshop in Lennep in North Rhein-Westphalia. By 1897 the family had moved to the great-grandmother of Thomas Ring in Southern Russia near Kyiv. In 1899 Thomas entered primary school in Schönebeck near Magdeburg. By 1905 the family finally settled down in Berlin, where he attended a private high school whose students mainly constituted members of the Prussian nobility. After high school, his father ordered him to begin an education as an engineer, but Thomas insisted on his wish to become a painter until they found a compromise and Thomas was allowed to become a chemographer. From 1908 to 1911 he absolved an apprenticeship as a chemographer, during which he learned different types of printing. Concordantly he also attended evening classes in painting and drawing at the royal art academy in Berlin. In 1911 he enrolled as a full-time student at the Royal art academy.

== World War I ==
His studies were interrupted as the World War I commenced in 1914 in which he volunteered for the German Empire. He was wounded in one of his first involvements in the battles and until his redeployment in October 1916, he got to know several poets and painters around the magazine Der Sturm such as Georg Muche, Herwarth Walden, Theodor Däubler or William Wauer. Initially stationed in the Western Front, he later was sent to the Eastern Front in Romania then in 1917 in Libau in Latvia. Back in the western front in November 1917, he was captured during the Battle of Cambrai and sent into a POW camp in Calais. He was eventually sentenced to death due to a mutiny in April 1918. Only the intervention of the Swiss Consulate spared him and following he was transferred to POW camp in Wales. In the camp, he began to be active as a painter. After several unsuccessful attempts to escape, he was released in November 1919. It was also in the end of 1919, when he was advised by his friend Georg Muche to seriously focus on astrology.

== Berlin 1919 – 1932 ==
In Berlin he was involved in the local Dada movement and exhibited his works in several Juryfreie Art Exhibits. In 1920 he and Gertrud Schröder, a librarian of the Der Sturm bookshop. In the year 1927 he became a member of the Communist Party of Germany in which's party organ The Red Flag (de:Die Rote Fahne) he subsequently published articles and poems. In 1928 his artistic success culminated in an exhibition at the Grand Exhibit of Berlin. A few months before the Nazi Party (NSDAP) of Adolf Hitler assumed the power, he decided to emigrate to Austria in November 1932.

== Austria 1932 – 1943 ==
In Austria his interest in astrology emerged with force, he began to write a newsletter on astrology and produced astrological horoscopes. In 1934 Ring and his wife moved to Graz. In the late 30s three astrological works of his were published by the Deutsche Verlags-Anstalt. His communist past brought him some troubles, in 1934 was questioned by the Austrian gendarmerie in Johnsbach and following the Austrian Anschluss in 1938, the situation became even more difficult. In June 1942, he was prohibited to further publish as his worldview wouldn't support the aims of Nazi Germany.

== World War II ==
In 1943 and 1944 during World War II he worked at the Psychological Institute of the University of Strassburg in occupied Alsace, France. There he worked with the parapsychologist Hans Bender who would write a foreword of the first volume of the Astrologic Anthropology. In November 1944 the allied forces liberated Strassburg from the Nazis and he and his wife came into a French POW camp. His wife died in February 1945 in the POW camp St.Sulpice la Pointe near Touluse.

== Later years ==
Following his release from the POW camp in 1946, he returned to Austria where he married the artist Irmtraut Bilger in 1947. In 1952 he and his wife settled in the countryside near Wittenschwand in the Black Forest in Germany. He took part in three exhibits (1961 in Berlin, 1971 and 1973 in Cologne) in which he mostly seen as part of a member of Der Strum and presented as a constructivist. In 1974 the Studio Dumont in Cologne, realized a solo exhibit with forty-seven of his works. He died on the 24 August 1983 in Schärdling, Austria and was buried in the cemetery in Graz St.Peter.

== Published works ==
He has published texts and poems in the magazines Der Sturm and the communist Die Rote Fahne. Between 1956 and 1973 he published the four volumes of the Astrologic Anthropology.

== Personal life ==
He was married to Gertrud Pauline Ernestine Schröder on the 16 November 1920. After he widowed in 1945, he married Irmtraut Bilger in May 1947.
