= Brookman =

Brookman is a surname. Notable people with the surname include:

- David Brookman (Australian politician) (1917–2000), Australian politician
- David Brookman, Baron Brookman (born 1937), British trade unionist and politician
- Eunice Brookman-Amissah, Ghanaian Minister of Health and Ambassador to the Netherlands
- George Brookman (1850–1927), Australian businessman and politician
- Herman Brookman (1891–1973), American architect
- Keith Brookman, Baron Brookman (1937–2025), British steel worker and trade unionist
- Lester George Brookman (1904–1971), Minnesota stamp dealer and expert philatelist
- Matthew P. Brookman (born 1968), American lawyer and United States district judge
- Norman Brookman (1884–1949), Australian politician
- Vera Brookman (1908–1964), British painter
- William Brookman (1859–1910), Australian businessman and politician

Fictional characters

- Kathy Brookman, character on the ITV soap opera Emmerdale

== See also ==
- Barbara Brookman Wallace (1918–2011), political figure in British Columbia
- Brookmans Park, Hertfordshire, England
