= M. Lamar Keene =

American author (1936–1996

Morris Lamar Keene (10 August 1936 – 11 June 1996), was a spirit medium in Tampa, Florida and at Camp Chesterfield Indiana, where he was known as the "Prince of the Spiritualists". He was also the trustee of Universal Spiritualist Association. He is best known for his 1976 book The Psychic Mafia, in which he coined the term "true-believer syndrome".

Keene was the subject of a six-episode series, Fake Psychic, on BBC Radio 4 in February 2022.

== Early life ==
Morris Lamar Keene was one of three children born in Tampa Hills, Florida, to Morris William Keene and Roxie Lucille Jones Keene. He later legally changed his name to Charles Lamar Hutchison, and that was his name at the time of his death.

== The Psychic Mafia ==
In 1976, Keene co-authored The Psychic Mafia, "as told to" Allen Spraggett, a well-known Canadian writer on paranormal topics. The writer William V. Rauscher, himself a believer in psychic powers, contributed a foreword and a bibliography and wrote that he had conducted 75 hours of interviews with Keene, during which Keene admitted that all of his psychic activities were done by fraudulent means. Keene revealed how he got rich by tricking thousands of people in séances (Randi 1995:135). James Randi, a professional magician, interviewed Keene in 1977, and discovered that Keene was quite unsophisticated in fooling people with magic, but Keene explained that his spiritualist clients were easy to fool (Randi 1982:246). Keene described how the victims fell for the most transparent ruses. Keene coined the term true-believer syndrome in the book (Keene 1997:151).

In The Psychic Mafia, Keene explicitly professed a belief in God, life after death, psychic phenomena and ESP, even after making his case against true believers and renouncing his trade as a phony medium.

Keene not only confessed that he himself was a fraudulent medium, but also that many of his colleagues were as well. He wrote that it was common practice for mediums to share information on clients, to help one another fool the clients into believing that the knowledge about them came from the spirit world. The book caused a storm among his former associates in spiritualist circles. There were telephone calls threatening his life and one night, while Keene was walking across his front lawn in Tampa, an unseen shooter fired at him and missed. He later dug the rifle bullet out of the wall of his house. (Keene 1997:156–57)

== Later life and death ==
Keene changed his name to Charles Lamar Hutchison, moved to another city, and entered the warehouse and storage business. In 1979, as he was leaving his office, a car drove up and an assailant fired several shots, hitting him and severing his femoral artery, resulting in an extended hospital stay (Randi 1982:246). He lived the rest of his life as Hutchison and died in 1998 at the age of 59.

== Quotation ==
- The true-believer syndrome merits study by science. What is it that compels a person, past all reason, to believe the unbelievable. How can an otherwise sane individual become so enamored of a fantasy, an imposture, that even after it's exposed in the bright light of day he still clings to it — indeed, clings to it all the harder?… No amount of logic can shatter a faith consciously based on a lie. — M. Lamar Keene and Allen Spraggett

== See also ==
- True-believer syndrome

== Bibliography ==
- M. Lamar Keene (as told to Allen Spraggett), The Psychic Mafia, Prometheus Books, 1997, ISBN 1-57392-161-0 (Originally published in 1976 by St. Martin's Press and published by Dell in 1977.)
