= Dan Korem =

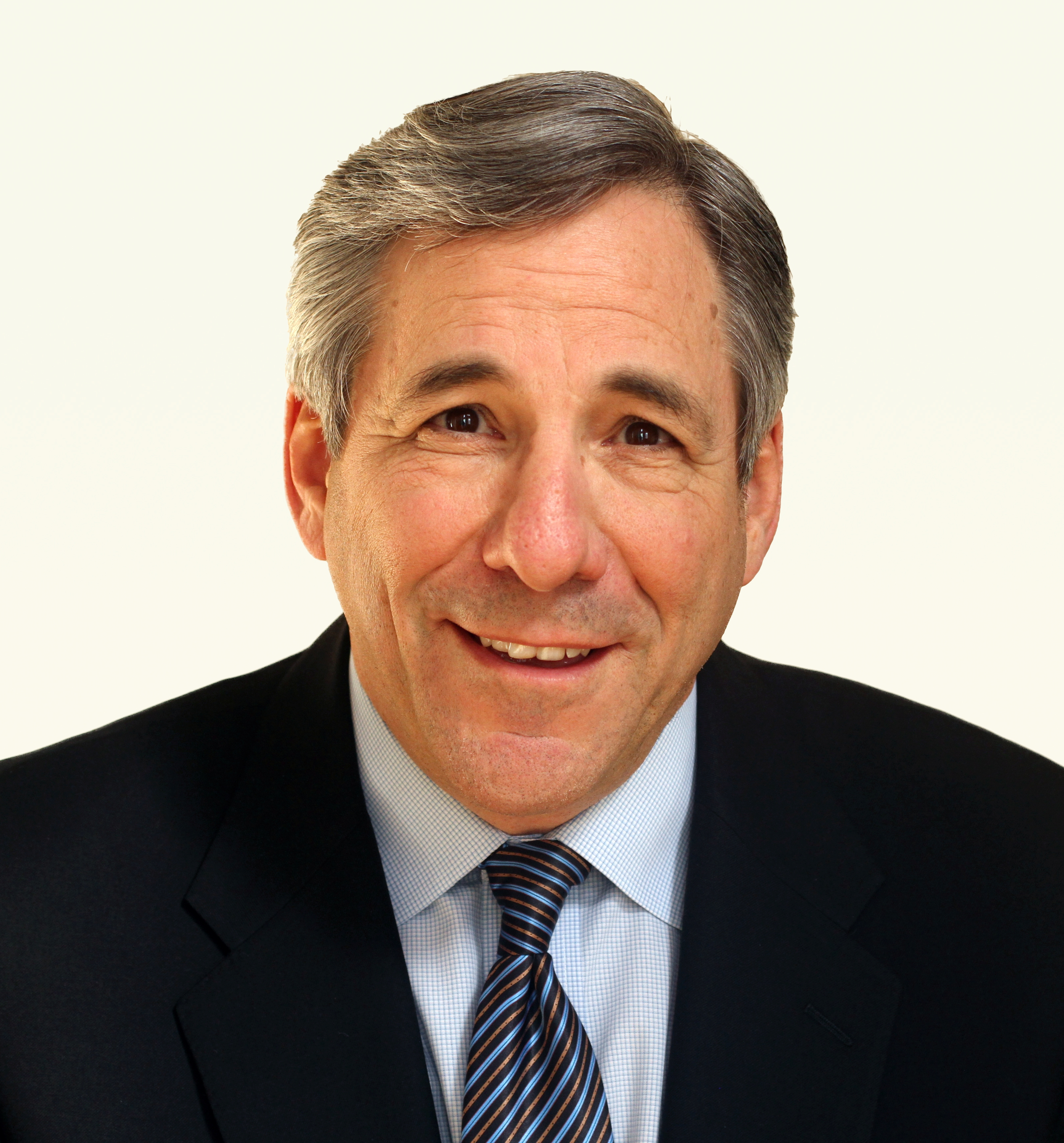
- Korem in 2016
- Born: 6 November 1952 (age 73); United States
- Occupations: Non-fiction author, speaker, journalist, consultant

Dan Korem (born November 6, 1952) is an American investigative journalist, author, documentary producer, speaker, and researcher. His focus is issues and practical applications related to snapshot behavioral reads. He is the author of several books, including: Snapshot - Reading and Treating People Right the First Time (2015), The Art of Profiling: Reading People Right the First Time, Expanded 2nd Edition (2012), Rage of the Random Actor - Disarming Catastrophic Acts and Restoring Lives (2005), Suburban Gangs: The Affluent Rebels (1995), and Streetwise Parents, Foolproof Kids (1992)

== Career ==
Korem's first profession was a professional magician (through the early 1990s) and he gained a reputation as a skilled magician. It was during this time that he focused on the psychological and social aspects of the subject of deception itself. He also developed an interest in claims of paranormal powers and has written about the tricks of psychics and others who fraudulently claimed to have powers. Korem is a theist and states that he embraces the Christian faith. His transition to investigative journalism started when he became involved in criminal investigations at the request of law enforcement agencies who were investigating scams by those who fraudulently claimed to have powers.

In 1981, he was asked to investigate an alleged psychic who was forming a cult-like group in Salt Lake City, Utah and led to Korem producing his first documentary, "Psychic Confession." Pulitzer Prize nominee Hugh Aynesworth, and Emmy Award-winning 60 Minutes producer Imre Horvath, were recruited by Korem for the project. The subject of the 1983 documentary was James Hydrick, who was molested as a child and is presently incarcerated for child molestation. Hydrick explained how he deceived people with demonstrations that appeared to be powers and his motivation to deceive. After the U.S. broadcast, the United States Department of Health and Human Services used the documentary as a training tool on the effects of child abuse. Korem continued to investigate others who fraudulently claimed to have powers through 1992 and found connections to how various groups formed, such as cults and gangs.

Korem formed Korem & Associates (K&A) in the early 1990s to provide consultancy and training how to make and apply snapshot reads. To date, the K&A faculty has globally trained and provided consultancy for over 40,000 professionals, including: entrepreneurs, corporate professionals, collegiate and professional athletic coaches, educators, law enforcement, and military.

=== Suburban and small-town gang research ===
Motivated by the 1992 drive-by shooting at a local high school in a Dallas suburb near his home, Korem went to eleven countries over seven years and investigated the new suburban, small-town gang trend that affected statistically safe communities. When in Hungary, Korem was introduced to the research of Maria Kopp, Ph.D. on protective factors to mitigate risk of suicide and gang recruitment. This led Korem to develop the "Missing Protector Strategy," which was published along with Koop's research in Suburban Gangs - The Affluent Rebels. Korem became a consultant on gang prevention and risk mitigation and The Missing Protector Strategy was applied in North American Schools, several with significant success.

=== Korem Profiling System ===
In the early 1990s, at the request of presidents of companies who were members of the Young Presidents' Organization (YPO), Korem developed the Korem Profiling System for negotiations in foreign countries to avoid racial, ethnic, and cultural stereotyping when making on-the-spot behavioral reads. He published several notable books on behavioral profiling for use by behavioral and non-behavioral science professionals as well as laypeople. The system was designed to allow individuals to develop the ability to make "snapshot" behavioral reads and behaviorally profile without stereotyping in spontaneous environments. Applications for the system include: negotiations, preventing domestic violence on military bases, educating students and improving classroom instruction, coaching athletes, violence prevention, and other applications where human interaction is an important factor.

In 2015, Captain Vic Johnson, was awarded the Army's "Social Worker of the Year" award. Johnson said it was the use of the Korem Profiling System and additional research provided by Korem that was a key factor in his rendering such service.

Korem continues to research practical behavioral profiling applications for professionals and laypeople. Presently, Korem delegates a special emphasis on teaching teens and young adults how to use the snapshot read skillset.

== Bibliography ==
- Snapshot - Reading and Treating People Right the First Time (2015)
- The Art of Profiling: Reading People Right the First Time, Expanded 2nd Edition (2012)
- Rage of the Random Actor - Disarming Catastrophic Acts and Restoring Lives (2005)
- Suburban Gangs: The Affluent Rebels (1995)
- Streetwise Parents, Foolproof Kids (1992)
- Powers: Testing the Psychic and Supernatural (1988)
- Korem Without Limits (1985)
- The Fakers: Exploding the Myths of the Supernatural (1980)
