= Irene Hughes =

American psychic

- Born: May 19, 1920; Tennessee
- Died: December 7, 2012 (aged 92); Beecher, Illinois
- Occupation: Psychic

Irene F. Hughes (May 19, 1920 – December 7, 2012) was an American psychic.

She was a favorite guest on The Merv Griffin Show. She also made regular appearances on Regis Philbin's Saturday Night in St. Louis and A.M. Los Angeles. Her clients included Eva Gabor and Howard Hughes.
