= Marcel Broekman =

American film director

- Born: 14 September 1922; Amsterdam, Netherlands
- Died: 21 March 2013 (aged 90); Newport Beach, California, USA
- Occupations: Filmmaker, Cinematographer, Palmist
- Years active: 1945–1980

Marcel Broekman (September 14, 1922 – March 21, 2013) was a Dutch-born American filmmaker, cinematographer and palmist.

== Work ==
Marcel Broekman was a co-producer of the cult hit "Amityville Horror" in partnership with Ronald Saland and Howard Kuperman through their Manhattan‐based business called Professional Film Services. His filmography includes featurettes and documentaries about the making of movies from 1962-1980, including over 41 feature films.

Broekman was a palmist featured on CBC's "Beyond Reason", a television quiz show seen throughout Canada from 1977 to 1980. Programs featured a group of experts from various paranormal specialties attempting to find the identity of hidden visitors.

Marcel Broekman was the author of the first encyclopedia about Palmistry titled "The Complete Encyclopedia of Practical Palmistry". The book served as one of the first written guides to reading and interpreting the lines and markings on the human hand. The book is divided into sections on events, character and potential, and case histories, and provides interpretations of each feature on a hand. It is organized in such a way that it is possible to read the palm at the same time as the text.

== Personal life ==
Born and raised in Amsterdam, Marcel Broekman escaped Nazi-occupied Holland during World War II in 1942. Prior to their escape, Marcel spent a great deal of time in Paris, France where he studied Palmistry from a veteran local palmist. He emigrated to Manhattan, New York with his parents and brother and soon thereafter found work in the entertainment industry alongside his filmmaker/producer father Barend Broekman.

He died at the age of 90 at home in Newport Beach, California. He is survived by a son, a daughter, 4 grandchildren and 7 great grandchildren.

== Selected filmography ==
- 1981 Acting: Lee Strasberg and the Actors Studio (Documentary)
- 1981 On Location with Rich and Famous (Documentary short)
- 1980 On Location with: FAME (Documentary short) (photographed by)
- 1979 On Location with the Champ (Documentary short) (as photography)
- 1978 Wiz on Down the Road (Short)
- 1977 Filming a Love Story: Bobby Deerfield (Documentary short)
- 1977 The Gauntlet: Behind the Scenes (Documentary short)
- 1976 A Look Into the 23rd Century (Documentary short)
- 1976 Eastwood in Action (Documentary short) (photographed by)
- 1976 The Redd Foxx Becomes a Movie Star (Documentary short)
- 1976 Harry Callahan/Clint Eastwood: Something Special in Films (Documentary short)
- 1975 The Day of the Director (Documentary short)
- 1975 Lumet: Film Maker (Documentary short)
- 1975 Urban Living: Funny and Formidable (Short)
- 1974 ...Promises to Keep (Documentary short)
- 1973 The Moviemakers (Documentary short)
- 1973 Martin Scorsese: Back on the Block (Documentary short) (photographed by)
- 1973 The Hero Cop: Yesterday and Today (Documentary short)
- 1972 The Dangerous World of 'Deliverance' (Documentary short) (photographed by)
- 1972 Screwball Comedies... Remember Them? (Documentary short)
- 1972 The Moviemakers (Documentary short)
- 1972 The Saga of Jeremiah Johnson (Documentary short) (photographed by)
- 1970 John Wayne and Chisum (Documentary short) (photography)
- 1970 On Location with the Owl and the Pussycat (Documentary short)
- 1968 'Bullitt': Steve McQueen's Commitment to Reality (Documentary short) (photographed by)
- 1968/II The Moviemakers (Documentary short) (photographed by)
