= Barend Broekman =

Dutch film producer

Barend Broekman (June 8, 1898 - July 8, 1970) was a Dutch film producer.

== Career ==
He was the President of Vedis Films, which had offices in New York and France.

He produced Three Waltzes (French: Les trois valses) which is a 1938 French historical musical film directed by Ludwig Berger and starring Yvonne Printemps, Pierre Fresnay and Henri Guisol. It is an operetta film, based on music by Oscar Straus. The film's sets were designed by the art directors Jean d'Eaubonne, Raymond Gabutti and Jacques Gut.

== Family ==
Barend was married to Jo Verdoner. The couple had two sons: Marcel and Robert. Born and raised in Amsterdam, Barend Broekman escaped Nazi-occupied Holland during World War II in 1942. He emigrated to Manhattan, New York with his wife and sons, and soon thereafter found work in the entertainment industry.

Barend Broekman died on July 8, 1970, at the age of 72 in London, United Kingdom.
