= Allen Spraggett =

Canadian writer and broadcaster (1932–2022)

- Born: Allen Frederick Spraggett; 26 March 1932; Toronto, Ontario, Canada
- Died: 19 July 2022 (aged 90); Newmarket, Ontario, Canada
- Occupation(s): Broadcaster, writer
- Known for: Paranormal topics

Allen Frederick Spraggett (26 March 1932 – 19 July 2022) was a Canadian writer and broadcaster, known for his works concerning the paranormal.

== Biography ==
During the 1950s, Spraggett was a minister of the Open Door Evangelical Church. He transferred to the United Church of Canada to become a minister there, then worked as the religion editor of Toronto Star. In the 1970s, he wrote The Unexplained, a syndicated newspaper column concerning the paranormal.

In 1975, Spraggett hosted a Canadian television show called E.S.P. In 1976, M. Lamar Keene co-authored a self-expose of fraudulent mediumship, The Psychic Mafia "as told to" Allen Spraggett.

Spraggett was host of the CBC television quiz show Beyond Reason from 1977 to 1980. He also hosted the radio shows Sun Spots and The Unexplained on CFRB in Toronto.

In 1979, he was charged with two counts of gross indecency, based on allegations by youths from Winnipeg. Spraggett was acquitted of these charges in April 1980. However, he had difficulty in resuming his broadcasting and writing career after that trial.

During the early 1980s Spraggett provided the daily horoscope forecasts for the Pete and Geets morning drive show on CFNY FM in Toronto.

Spraggett was a believer in faith healing and wrote a biography of Kathryn Kuhlman. He described Kuhlman as the "greatest faith healer since Biblical times."

He died in Newmarket, Ontario on 19 July 2022.

== Bibliography ==
- The Unexplained (1967) LCCN 67-26236
- The Bishop Pike Story (1970) OCLC 119820
- Kathryn Kuhlman : The Woman who Believes in Miracles (1970) LCCN 71-103843
- Probing the Unexplained (1971) OCLC 208605
- Arthur Ford, The Man Who Talked with the Dead (1973) LCCN 72-9600
- The Case for Immortality (1974) LCCN 73-91365
- The World of the Unexplained (1974) OCLC 4481248
- The Spiritual Frontier (1975, co-writer with William Rauscher) ISBN 0385071892
- New Worlds of the Unexplained (1976) OCLC 15765037
- The Psychic Mafia (1976, co-writer with M. Lamar Keene) OCLC 2212880
- Ross Peterson: The New Edgar Cayce (1977) ISBN 0385122985
