= Piet Hein Hoebens =

Dutch journalist, skeptic and critic of parapsychology

Piet Hein Hoebens (29 September 1948, Utrecht – 22 October 1984) was a Dutch journalist, skeptic, and critic of parapsychology.

Hoebens is most well known for debunking the claims of psychic detectives. He worked as a Dutch journalist and investigated claims of paranormal phenomena. He was a staff member for the newspaper De Telegraaf for 13 years and a member of the Committee for Skeptical Inquiry.

He was an associate of Marcello Truzzi and contributed to the Zetetic Scholar regarding the claims of psychics such as Peter Hurkos and Gerard Croiset which he found to be bogus.

Hoebens killed himself in October 1984.

== Publications ==
- Hoebens, Piet Hein. (1981). Gerard Croiset: Investigation of the Mozart of "Psychic Sleuths". Skeptical Inquirer 6: 18–28. available online
- Hoebens, Piet Hein. (1981). The Mystery Men From Holland I: Peter Hurkos' Dutch Cases. Zetetic Scholar 8: 11–17,
- Hoebens, Piet Hein. (1982). Croiset and Professor Tenhaeff: Discrepancies in Claims of Clairvoyance. Skeptical Inquirer 6: 32–40. available online
- Hoebens, Piet Hein. (1982). Mystery Men From Holland II: The Strange Case of Gerard Croiset. Zetetic Scholar 9: 21–32,
- Hoebens, Piet Hein. (1983). Sense and Nonsense in Parapsychology. Skeptical Inquirer: 8: 121–132.
- Hoebens, Piet Hein. (with Marcello Truzzi, 1985). Reflections on Psychic Sleuths. In A Skeptic's Handbook of Parapsychology, ed. Paul Kurtz. Prometheus Books. pp. 631–643. ISBN 0-87975-300-5
- Hoebens, Piet Hein (2017). Hövelmann, Gerd H.; Michels, Hans (eds.). Legitimacy of Unbelief: The Collected Papers of Piet Hein Hoebens. Vienna and Zurich: LIT-Verlag. ISBN 9783643908551. OCLC 967855203.
