= Lior Suchard =

Israeli mentalist (born 1981)

- ליאור סושרד
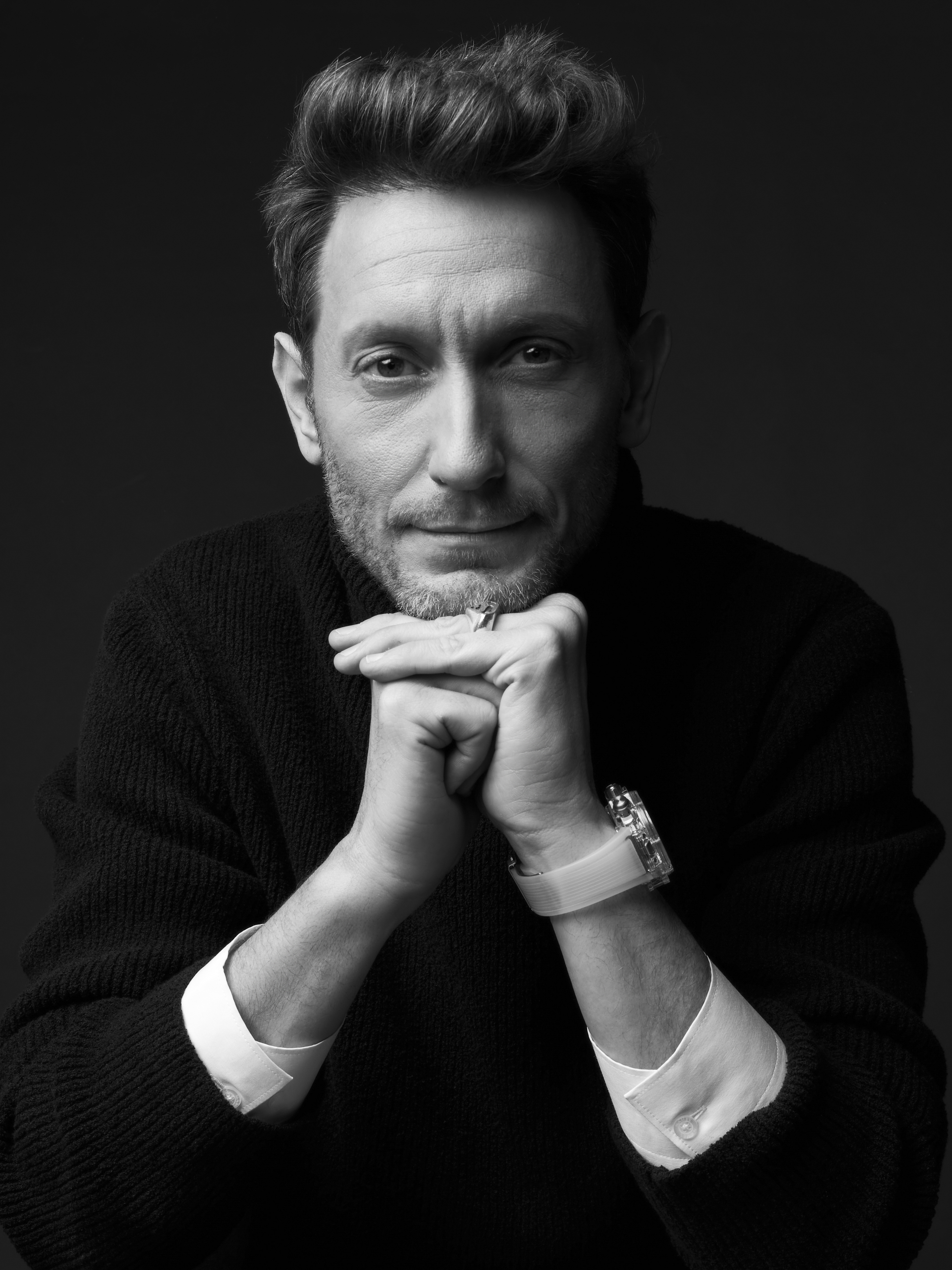
- Born: 6 December 1981 (age 44); Haifa, Israel
- Occupation: Mentalist entertainer
- Years active: 2005–present
- Known for: The Successor winner
- Website: liorsuchard.com

Lior Suchard (Hebrew: ליאור סושרד, pronounced [liˈ(ʔ)oʁ ˈsuʃaʁd]; born 6 December 1981) is an Israeli mentalist, entrepreneur, businessman, entertainer, performer, and master of ceremonies.

== Early life ==
Suchard was born in Haifa, Israel, as the youngest of three brothers. At a young age, he first performed in front of school children, and at 14 he began to do shows at events and birthdays parties. He is a graduate of the Reali School in Haifa.

== Early stage career and The Successor ==
After completing three years of military service as a Patriot fighter in the Israeli Air Force, Suchard began to increase his appearances in Israel. His first national television exposure was on various morning shows.

In 2005 Suchard was invited to appear on The Successor (also known as The Next Uri Geller), Uri Geller's Israeli TV show, which was aired in late 2006. Suchard beat eight other candidates and won the competition to be Geller's successor. This was an international breakthrough for Suchard because the program was sold to and broadcast in several countries, including Germany, Poland and Italy.

In 2011, the documentary Skeptical dealt with the development of his international career as a sensory artist. The film was screened on Channel 2 in 2012.

== Media appearances ==
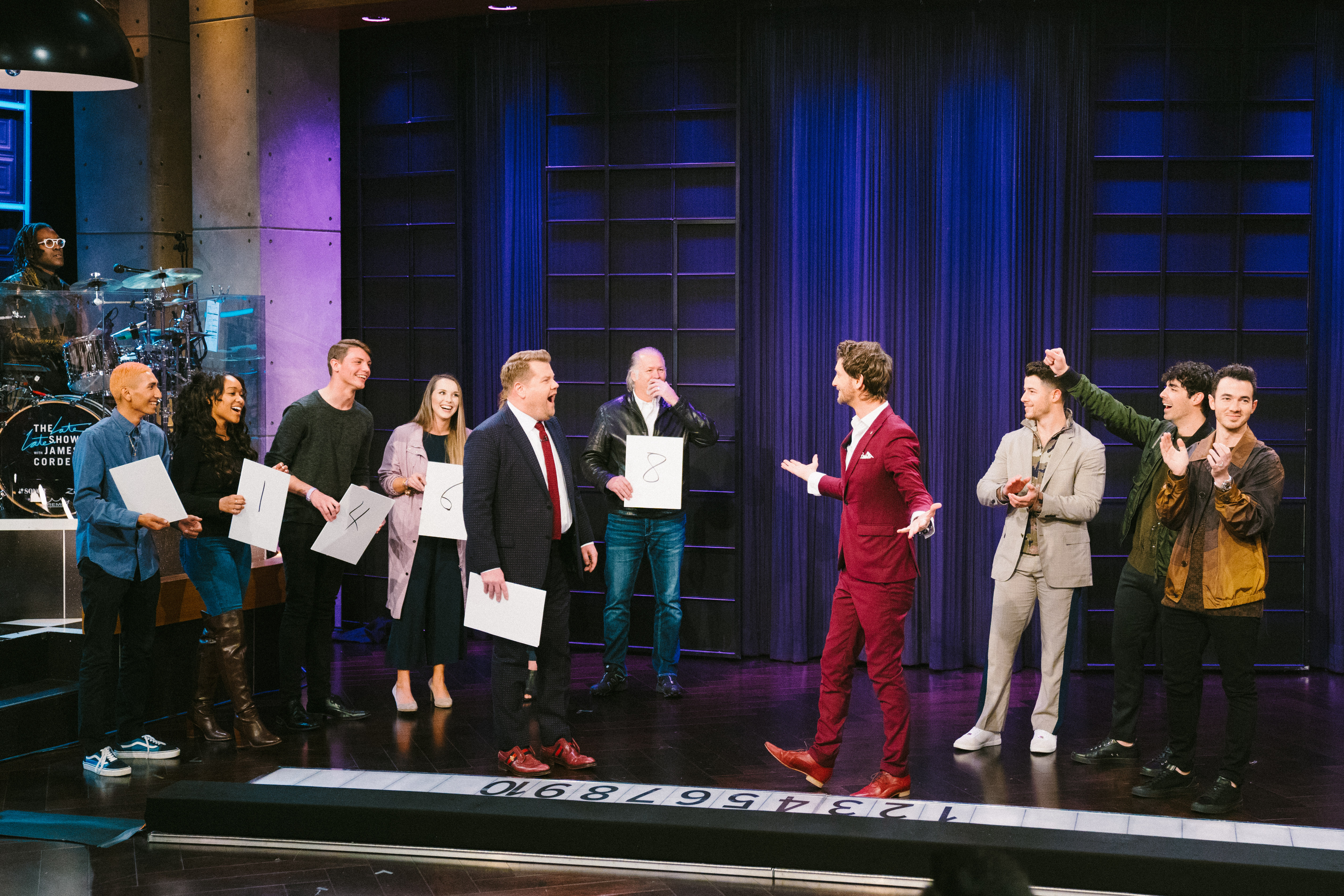
Lior Suchard in 2019

Suchard’s profile grew after appearing on a number of American TV shows such as The Tonight Show with Jay Leno, on which he appeared five times (2010, 2011, 2012, and twice in 2013) The View, Larry King Now, Good Morning America, The Late Late Show with James Corden, Live with Kelly and Ryan, Dr. Phil and The Ellen DeGeneres Show.

Suchard hosted and directed the game show Money Pump, which was broadcast in May 2012 on Channel 2.

Suchard was the host of Brain Games.

In 2020 Lior's new show "gone mental with Lior" aired on the video platform Quibi. Lior co-produced and star the show alongside celebrities like Ben Stiller, David Dobrik and Kate Hudson.

In 2019, Suchard was chosen to appear on the telecast for the Eurovision Song Contest 2019, where he appeared in the event's green room, presenting his skills to the contestants and to the television audience. This was the first time in the history of the competition that a non-musical guest performer was invited to be on the telecast.

In 2010 Suchard placed 28th on People Magazine's Sexiest Men Alive list.

== Celebrities ==
Suchard has performed for many famous people such as Drake, Owen Wilson, Jeff Goldblum, Bill Clinton, Oprah Winfrey, Stevie Wonder, Usain Bolt, Novak Djokovic, Sachin Tendulkar, Amber Heard, Rebel Wilson, Robin McGraw, Larry King, Gerard Butler, Piers Morgan, Steve Waugh, Kim Kardashian, Jennifer Lopez, Jamie Foxx, Harry Connick Jr, Kristen Bell, Kanye West, the Jonas Brothers, and Andrea Bocelli.

== Real life predictions ==
In 2013, during the elections to the Nineteenth Knesset, Suchard was invited to predict the results of the elections about ten days before counting the votes. He wrote the results on a note enclosed in an envelope that was placed in a vault under strict guard at the Dizengoff Center in Tel Aviv throughout the days leading up to the election. After the counting of votes, it was revealed that Suchard had accurately predicted the results.

In January 2016, 10 hours before the opening of the 20/20 cricket match between Australia and India, Suchard appeared on Australian television and correctly predicted the final score of the match.

== Touring ==
Suchard is a popular touring act and has performed in over 70 countries. In February 2016 he embarked on a tour of 18 performances in Australia. He appeared all over the country including seven times at the Sydney Opera House.

In 2012, Suchard went to celebrate the 70th birthday of Barbra Streisand. He was invited to be the main show, during which he stunned the famous guests. Following this, he was invited to be a part of her tour. The first performance was attended by about 7,000 members and associates of the singer, including entertainment stars and other performances attracted a crowd of 20,000 people. Streisand's reaction to Suchard's ability was quoted in the Times of Israel:

In 2018, Suchard did a series of shows together with behavioral scientist Dan Ariely.

== Business career ==
Suchard invested in Reposify, which was later acquired by Crowdstrike. Suchard is a partner with Merlin Ventures. Suchard was also an investor and strategic advisor in MUGO. He is an investor and advisor in the startup company Anywear. He is also invested in Thursday Boot and Emboline. He was chief brand officer of Robotemi. He is also a Hublot Ambassador.

== Corporate work ==
In 2017, he appeared in El Al's safety instruction video.

Suchard was in a series of commercials for Mazda and did videos for Israel’s Aliyah and Integration Ministry.

== Private events ==
Suchard works at private events such as the wedding of Thibaut Courtois and Mishel Gerzig, Kanye West’s birthday party and Leonardo Dicaprio Foundation.

== Awards ==
Suchard won the Mandrake d’Or award for Best Mentalist and the Milbourn Award for Mentalism. Suchard won the Light of Israel award from the Ministry of Foreign Affairs.

Suchard's live show called "Supernatural Entertainment" won the Best Innovative Act Award at the 2015 Live Quotient Awards in India.

== Book ==
Suchard is the author of Mind Reader: Unlock The Power of Your Mind to Get What You Want published by HarperCollins. In it he teaches the basics of psychology and explains the main theories and tools he uses throughout his performances of mind reading.

== Personal life ==
Suchard met his future wife, Tal, when she was working in a cafe. They live in Tel Aviv with their three children.
