= Amnesty bin =

Receptacle into which items can be placed without incurring consequences

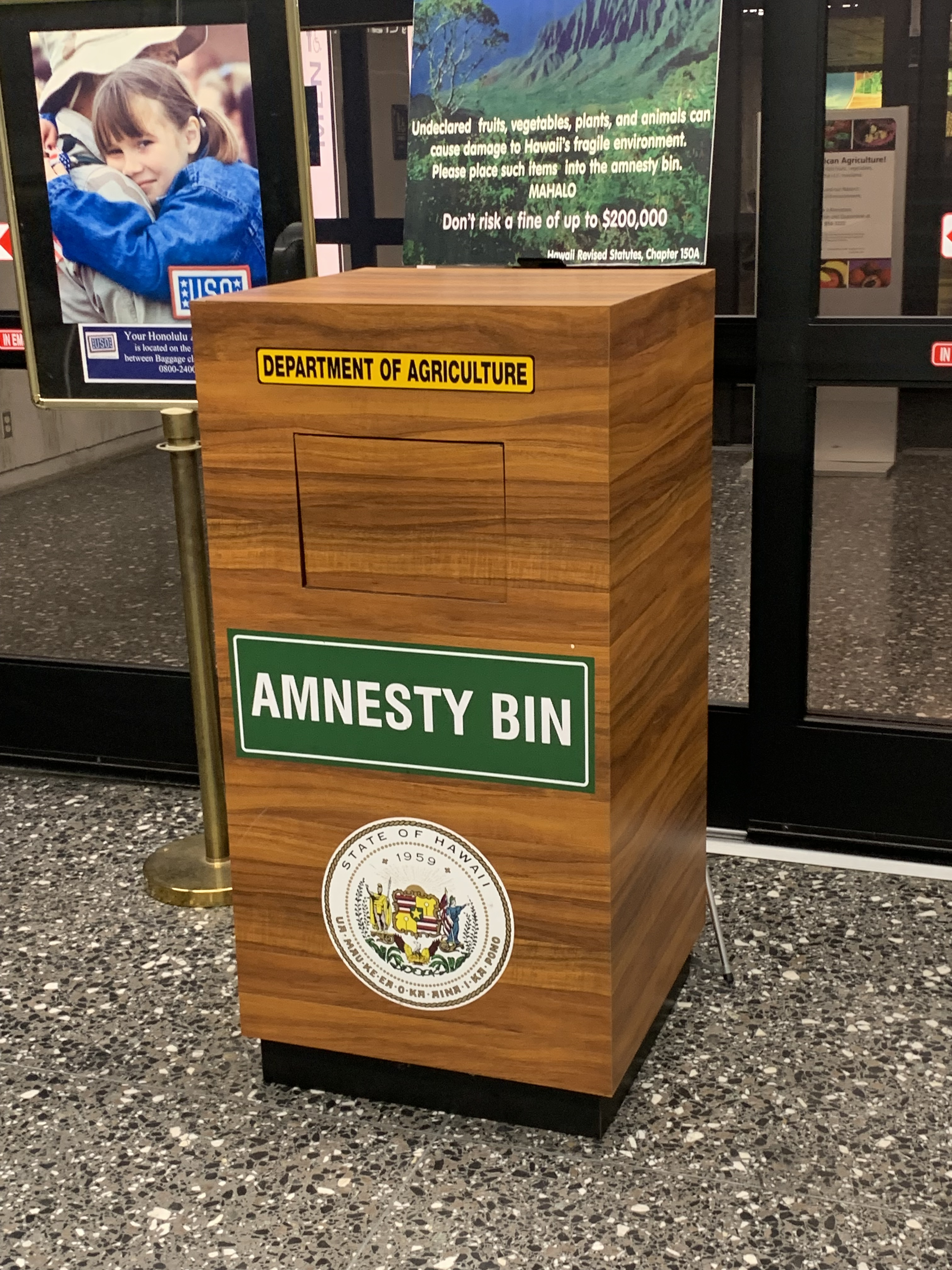
An amnesty bin at Daniel K. Inouye International Airport

An amnesty bin or amnesty box is a receptacle into which items can be placed without incurring consequences related to those items. Amnesty bins have been used for various items, including drugs, weapons, fruit, invasive species, and animals. A version of an amnesty bin is also used at Amazon warehouses for damaged items.

== At music venues ==
In Europe, drug-related deaths at music festivals present a public health concern. Amnesty bins for drugs at festivals have been proposed as a method of harm reduction; a study in Ireland found that 75% of participants said they would use amnesty bins for drugs if they were part of a drug checking system that would provide alerts about dangerous drugs in circulation. One London dance venue required patrons to place any illegal drugs they possessed into an amnesty bin as of 1999. Items placed into the bin in 1998 and 1999 were analyzed in a 2001 study of illicit drug consumption, in order to determine which street drugs were currently available.

== At airports ==
=== In Australia ===
To prevent certain pests and diseases from entering areas within the country, amnesty bins are used in Australia as part of the Fruit Fly Exclusion Zone (FFEZ). Travelers to Melbourne from outside the FFEZ are asked to place any fruit they are carrying into an amnesty bin in the airport.

=== In New Zealand ===
In New Zealand airports, amnesty bins coupled with signage about the fines for bringing in invasive species are used to help preserve the biosecurity of the isolated country. Chinese and English signage is used on the bins. The bins and signage are placed by the Ministry for Primary Industries.

=== In the United States ===
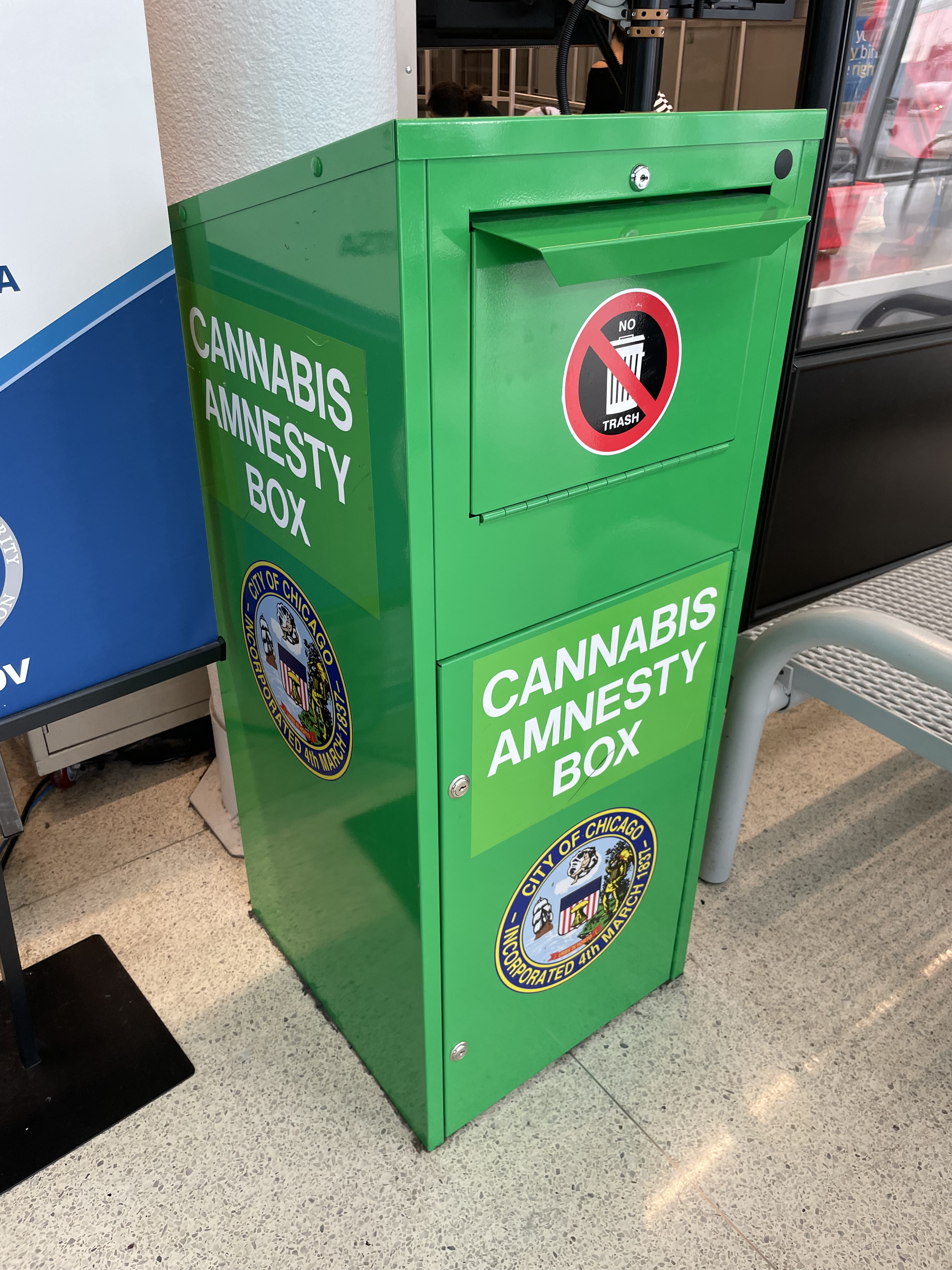
Cannabis amnesty box at O'Hare Airport

==== Chicago ====
In 2020, bright blue amnesty boxes for cannabis disposal were placed outside the security checkpoints at O'Hare International Airport and Midway International Airport in Chicago. Intended to allow departing travelers to dispose of cannabis, which is legal in Illinois but illegal under federal law, the boxes are owned by the Chicago Department of Aviation and serviced by the Chicago Police Department.

==== Colorado ====
At Colorado Springs Airport, amnesty boxes just before the entrance to security allow departing travelers to dispose of cannabis, which is legal in Colorado but illegal on commercial flights in the United States. The boxes have been used to dispose of cannabis edibles, electronic cigarettes, pipes, and concentrate.

An additional amnesty box for cannabis is located at Aspen/Pitkin County Airport. Most flights from the airport land at Denver International Airport, where cannabis is banned. Departing travelers at Aspen/Pitkin with cannabis are instructed to either return it to their vehicles or place it in the bin.

==== Hawaii ====
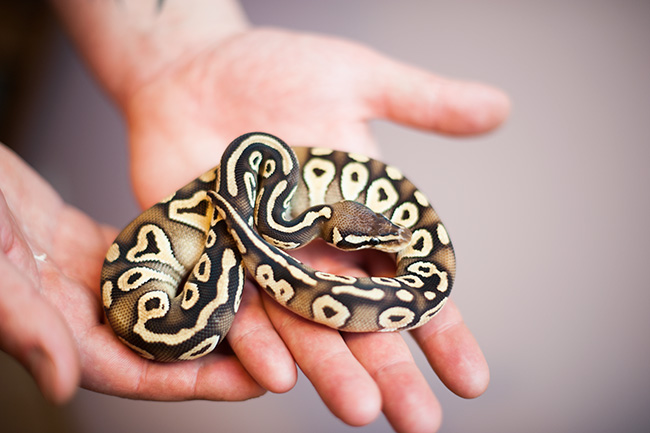
A small ball python, about the size of the one found in a Honolulu amnesty bin

At airports in Hawaii, amnesty bins are provided for agricultural reasons, intended to prevent the introduction of invasive plants and animals. Arriving passengers, who have already filled out agricultural declaration forms, can place prohibited items in the bins without risking consequences. According to the acting manager of the Plant Quarantine Branch at the Hawaiʻi Department of Agriculture, 60 to 70 pounds (27 to 32 kg) of material are placed in the bins at Daniel K. Inouye International Airport in Honolulu every few days; pest-free plant material can be used as animal feed for confiscated animals at the Department of Agriculture facilities, while contaminated material is destroyed. In 2002, a foot-long ball python was found in one of the airport's amnesty bins. The snake was believed to have been placed into the bin inside an airsickness bag, and subsequently escaped from the bag, as a torn bag was also found in the bin. It was the first animal ever found in an amnesty bin in the Oʻahu airport.

==== Las Vegas ====
In 2018, thirteen green amnesty boxes were placed in high-traffic areas of McCarran International Airport (now Harry Reid International Airport) in Las Vegas for disposal of cannabis and prescription drugs. Seven more were planned to be placed at Henderson Executive Airport, North Las Vegas Airport, and areas of Reid International Airport operated by private companies.

== Knife bins ==
A knife bin is a bin in which people can anonymously dispose of knives, avoiding possible criminal offenses related to knives. One such amnesty bin for knives, located in Hackney, had more than 1,500 weapons placed into it over two years in the early 2010s.

== In the Amazon fulfillment process ==
Fulfillment centers belonging to Amazon use amnesty bins as part of their process. Robotic stowers of incoming items place damaged or unscannable items into amnesty bins rather than bins for sorted items, thereby identifying them as problems to be solved later by a human. For outgoing items, human workers place damaged or unscannable items into amnesty bins for the same reason; robotic pickers for outbound items do the same.
