= Knife Angel =

Contemporary sculpture highlighting knife crime

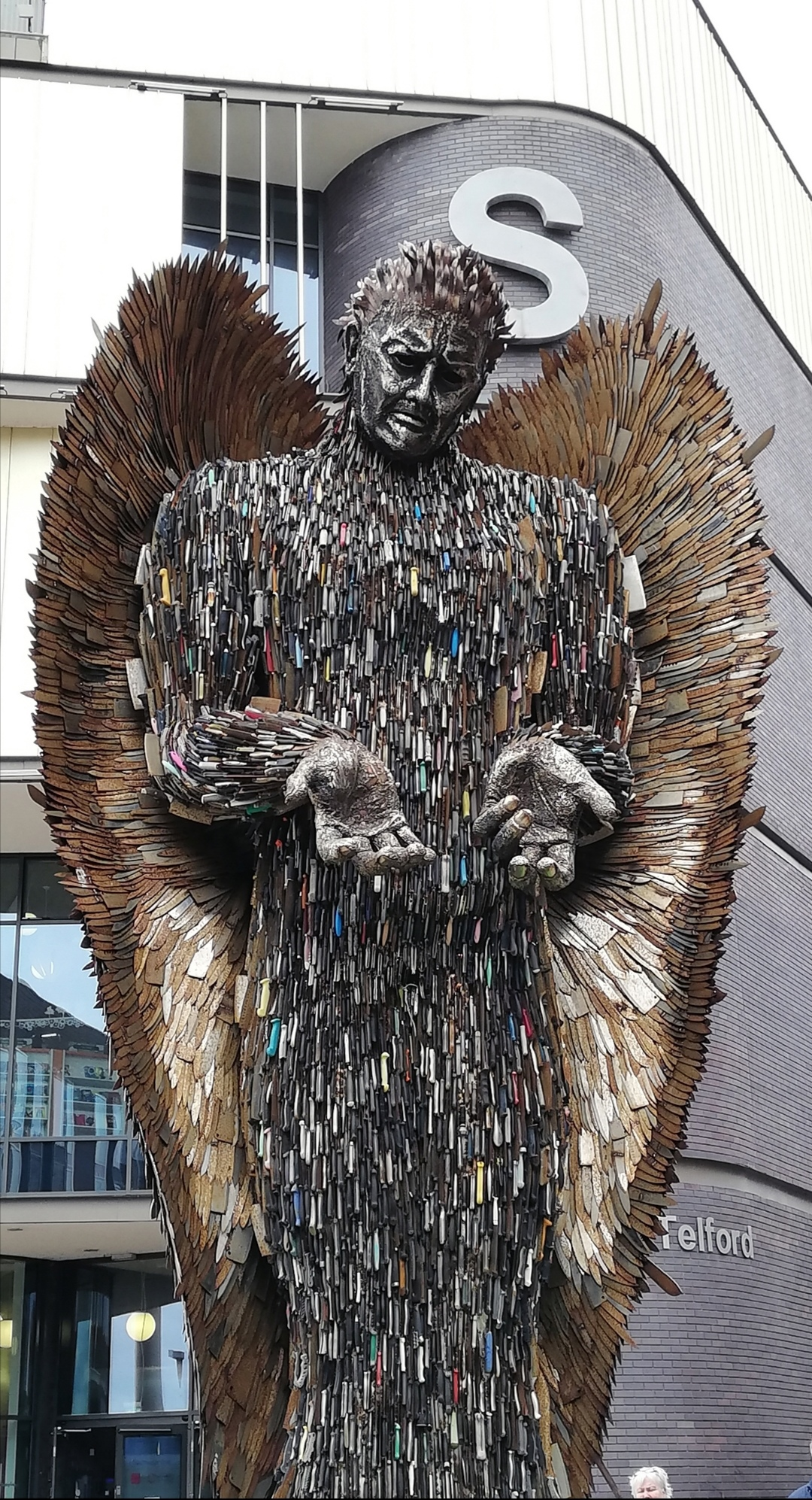
- The Knife Angel, Telford, March, 2020
- Artist: Alfie Bradley, British Ironworks Centre
- Completion date: 2018
- Type: Sculpture
- Dimensions: (27 feet (8.2 m) in)

The Knife Angel (also referred to as the National Monument Against Violence & Aggression) is a contemporary sculpture formed of 100,000 knives created by artist Alfie Bradley and the British Ironworks Centre, based in Oswestry, England.

Completed in 2018, the structure of the angel stands at 27 ft (8.2 m) tall. In order to create the sculpture, 200 knife banks were produced by the Ironworks and amnesties held for individuals to anonymously donate their knives. Knives seized by police were also included, some of which arrived in evidence tubes still with bodily fluids on their surface.

The sculpture was created in order to highlight knife crime in the United Kingdom and educate young people on the harmful effect violent behaviour can have on their communities.

The sculpture was made at a reported cost of £500,000.

== Construction ==
Once the knives were delivered to the British Ironworks Centre in Oswestry, Shropshire, each one was disinfected before being blunted. The knives were then welded onto an existing steel frame to form the body of the angel and remaining knives were welded onto steel plates to form the wings, giving a feather-like appearance.

By the project's completion, all 43 police forces contributed to the total 100,000 knives, blades, swords and other weapons used in violent crime. In addition to these blades, one consignment contained explosives that were packaged incorrectly. This necessitated Ministry of Defence bomb disposal personnel being called out and performing a controlled explosion.

Families who lost loved ones as a result of knife crime were invited to have a message engraved onto a blade used in the sculpture. Over 80 families contacted the artist in order to engrave a personal message on a blade used in the wings. The centre and the sculptor have been criticized by some relatives of the victims of knife crime, but have also been praised by others; the artist was a victim of knife crime himself.

In 2014, early design stages of the Knife Angel are shown on the television show Escape to the Country where show host, Jules Hudson was allowed by artist, Alfie Bradley, to weld a World War II bayonet onto a metal plate as part of the project. The project was originally expected to be complete in 2015, as mentioned in the episode. Sketches of Bradley's Knife Angel are shown as well as his previous knife statues.

== The National Anti-Violence UK Tour ==
Following the completion of the sculpture in 2018 it began a nationwide tour in order to highlight the anti-violence message behind its construction.

The sculpture was on display in Corby, Northamptonshire until 29 May 2022, and for the month of June was displayed in Aberystwyth.

The sculpture was on display outside the Grand Entrance to Birkenhead Park on the Wirral Peninsula for July 2022.

The sculpture was on display at Kirkleatham Museum, Redcar during August 2022. In December 2022 the Knife Angel travelled to Milton Keynes where a variety of educational events created a long lasting legacy.

The Knife Angel was situated in Newport in Wales, near Friars Walk, for the month of November 2022.

The Knife Angel was situated in Slough in January 2023, Gloucester Cathedral for February 2023 and Guildford Cathedral from 1 until 30 March 2023. It was in Crewe, Cheshire during May 2023, and arrived in Nuneaton, Warwickshire on 1 June to spend four weeks in the town's Market Place. It was then displayed in Lichfield, Staffordshire for a month from 1 July.

The Knife Angel was taken to Colchester, Essex outside of the Jumbo water tower from 1 of October until 31 October 2023.

It was later moved and situated in Bolton, Greater Manchester, from 1 November 2023 until 30 November 2023.

The Knife Angel then exhibited in Walsall remaining there till 28 December 2023. On 25 January 2024 it was announced the Knife Angel would travel to be displayed at the Royal Armouries Museum in Leeds. The Knife Angel was temporarily installed on The Rock in Bury on 29 February.

The Knife Angel was displayed in Taunton, Somerset for the month of April 2024. In May 2024, the Knife Angel was located at the Italian Gardens in Weston-super-Mare. The Knife Angel was displayed in Keel Square in Sunderland for the month of June 2024. For the month of July, The Knife Angel was on display outside the Victoria Centre, Southend-on-Sea.

From 28 August 2024 The Knife Angel was displayed in Haverhill, Suffolk. From 2 December 2024, the Knife Angel is displayed in Perth, Scotland.

From the 31 May until the 28 June 2025, the knife angel was displayed in Newton Aycliffe, County Durham, England.

Throughout October 2025 The Knife Angel is being displayed in Howardsgate Welwyn Garden City, Hertfordshire.

The Knife Angel arrived in Plymouth, Devon, in March 2026.

The Knife Angel arrived in Newark-on-Trent on 21 April 2026, where the Knife Angel's visit coincided with the 1 year Anniversary of local man James Cook (Cookie) who was brutally murdered on Castlegate on 1 May 2026. The Knife Angel remained in the Market Square until 20 May 2026.

== Potential listing ==
The sculpture is one of hundreds that were nominated in 2018 for listed status.

== Knife Bee ==
With a similar theme, the Ironworks Centre has also made a 'Knife Bee' from knives and guns, with the bee symbolising industrious Manchester and the construction from weapons representing the city's intolerance of violence.
