= Ella (novel) =

1998 novel written by Uri Geller

- Cover of first hardback edition. The child on the cover is Geller's daughter.
- Author: Uri Geller
- Language: English
- Genre: Science fiction, parapsychology
- Publisher: Headline
- Publication date: 12 March 1998
- Publication place: United Kingdom
- Media type: Print (hardback & paperback)
- Pages: 438
- ISBN: 9780747259206
- Followed by: Dead Cold

Ella, or Ella: A Psychic Thriller, is a science fiction novel by Israeli illusionist and self-proclaimed psychic Uri Geller, first published in 1998. The novel tells the story of Ella Wallis, an abused 14-year-old girl living in Bristol, England, who develops telekinesis, levitation, and other psychic powers and achieves fame while at the midst of a power struggle between adults who want to control her.

== Background ==
The book's themes marked a change for Geller, moving his focus away from illusions such as spoon bending and onto the power of prayer. As part of his research for the novel, Geller spent two days at Saint Catherine's Monastery, at the foot of Mount Sinai. Geller said in an interview with Heise Online that he gave powers to Ella that he did have, but always wanted, and noted that a lot of the plot within the book that covered poor public relations stunts and bad press was inspired by the reactions he himself had received over the years, as was the criticism made by the book of skepticism. He expressed his hope to The Times that Ella would be made into a movie, but as yet this has not been the case. The Guardian suggested parallels between Ella's and Geller's lives, with the darkness in Geller's life being reflected in much of the plot of the book.

== Plot ==
The story concerns a fourteen-year-old girl named Ella Wallis, who lives in Bristol with her parents. She is bullied at school due to her family's poverty, and is abused at home, both physically by her fundamentalist Christian father, and sexually by his brother, Ella's uncle. Her French mother is an alcoholic. The stress and upset in her life result in Ella developing bulimia, and subsequently paranormal powers, beginning with pyrokinesis, when she sets a Nativity scene alight at school. She then develops telekinesis in a response to her uncle trying to exorcise her, moving books with her mind. As Ella's abilities become more widely-known, a series of people try to exploit her, including Icelandic psychic researcher Peter Guntarson, Spanish public relations specialist José Miguel Dóla, and her own family, who realise the money-earning potential of Ella's abilities. Over time Ella develops further powers, including levitation, teleportation, remote viewing, and psychic healing. She gets ever thinner, from the ongoing impact of her eating disorder, and eventually appears to die live on television, with her final act being to heal the sickness of everyone in the world, with something known as the "Ella Effect". The book hints that she was actually transformed into an angel.

== Reception ==
Publishers Weekly described the book as an "acerbic portrait of the sensationalist media, [which] adds a new twist to this predictable but engaging tale". In a highly critical review, The Jerusalem Post said that "There is not a single redeeming feature in any one of the ugly, unpleasant, and indeed revolting characters in this book", and that "as a thriller writer, Geller is a flop." 10 years later, in 2008, Geller was still upset by the Post's review, and blamed it on the "intelligentsia" not accepting him.
