= Charles Panati =

American journalist (born 1943)

- Born: Charles Panati; March 13, 1943 (age 83); Baltimore, Maryland
- Occupation: Physicist
- Writing career
- Period: Active: 20th Century
- Genre: Paranormal
- Notable works: The Geller Papers; The Silent Intruder
- Literary movement: Paranormal

Charles Panati (born March 13, 1943) is a former college professor, industrial physicist, author and science editor of Newsweek.

== Biography ==
Panati was born in Baltimore, Maryland, and raised in Atlantic City, New Jersey. After graduating from Villanova University (1961–65) with a B.S. in physics, Panati obtained a master's degree in Radiation Health Physics (1966) from Columbia University and worked in cancer research at the Columbia Presbyterian Hospital. Panati is openly gay.

== Parapsychology ==
After joining Newsweek in 1971, Panati became interested in parapsychology and published his first book, Supersenses: Our Potential For Parasensory Experience (1974), which described parapsychological research into extrasensory perception. The book was described in a review as a respectable survey of psi phenomena but "the skeptic will remain unconvinced... because the subject is not amenable to rational, empirical scrutiny." Panati later met the Israeli psychic Uri Geller, who suggested Panati collect and publish 22 research papers by scientists around the world who had investigated the spoon-bender's alleged abilities. The Geller Papers (1976), edited by Panati, caused controversy when it was published. Several prominent magicians came forward to demonstrate that Geller's so-called psychic talents could be easily duplicated by stage magicians. Science writer Martin Gardner wrote that Panati had been fooled by Geller's trickery and The Geller Papers were an "embarrassing anthology". In Death Encounters (1979), Panati investigated the phenomenon of clinical death, in which subjects report being drawn toward a white light while wrestling with the will to live. Pittsburgh Post-Gazette writer Wendy Thomson Warner wrote that, "His views on parapsychology have, rightly or wrongly, been the target of widespread skepticism in the scientific community."

== Origins book series ==
Panati has written a series of books about the origins of ordinary, everyday things, beginning in 1984 with The Browser’s Book of Beginnings. He wrote a second book, Extraordinary Origins of Everyday Things in 1987 that was praised as "excellent bathroom reading". Subsequent books in the series were Panati’s Parade of Fads, Follies and Manias: The Origins of Our Most Cherished Obsessions in 1991, Sacred Origins of Profound Things: The Stories Behind the Rites and Rituals of the World’s Religions in 1996, Sexy Origins of Intimate Things in 1998, and Words To Live By: Origins of Common Wisdom Expressions in 1999.

His book Extraordinary Origins of Everyday Things has been described as a "handy reference". Panati's Sacred Origins of Profound Things received a positive review and was described as "an informative and entertaining book on the origins of religious ideas, sacred items, worship practices, holy symbols, and holidays."

== The Silent Intruder: Surviving the Radiation Age ==
In 1981, Panati and his brother, Michael Hudson, wrote The Silent Intruder: Surviving the Radiation Age, a book that seeks to examine the interaction of radiation and human tissue.

== Media ==
Panati has appeared as a guest on Oprah, Regis and Letterman.

== Publications ==
- Words To Live By, Viking Penguin, 1999
- Sexy Origins and Intimate Things, Viking Penguin, 1998
- Sacred Origins of Profound Things, Viking Penguin, 1996
- Panati’s Parade of Fads, Follies and Manias, HarperCollins, 1991
- Extraordinary Endings of Practically Everything and Everybody, HarperCollins, 1989
- Extraordinary Origins of Everyday Things, HarperCollins, 1987
- The Browser’s Book of Beginnings, Houghton Mifflin, 1984
- The Pleasuring of Rory Malone, St. Martin's Press, 1982
- The Silent Intruder: Surviving the Radiation Age, Houghton Mifflin, 1981
- Breakthroughs, Houghton Mifflin, 1980
- Death Encounters, Bantam, 1979
- Links, Houghton Mifflin, 1978
- The Geller Papers, Houghton Mifflin, 1976
- Supersenses, Quadrangle/The New York Times, 1974
