= British Ironworks Centre & Shropshire Sculpture Park =

Attraction in Shropshire, England

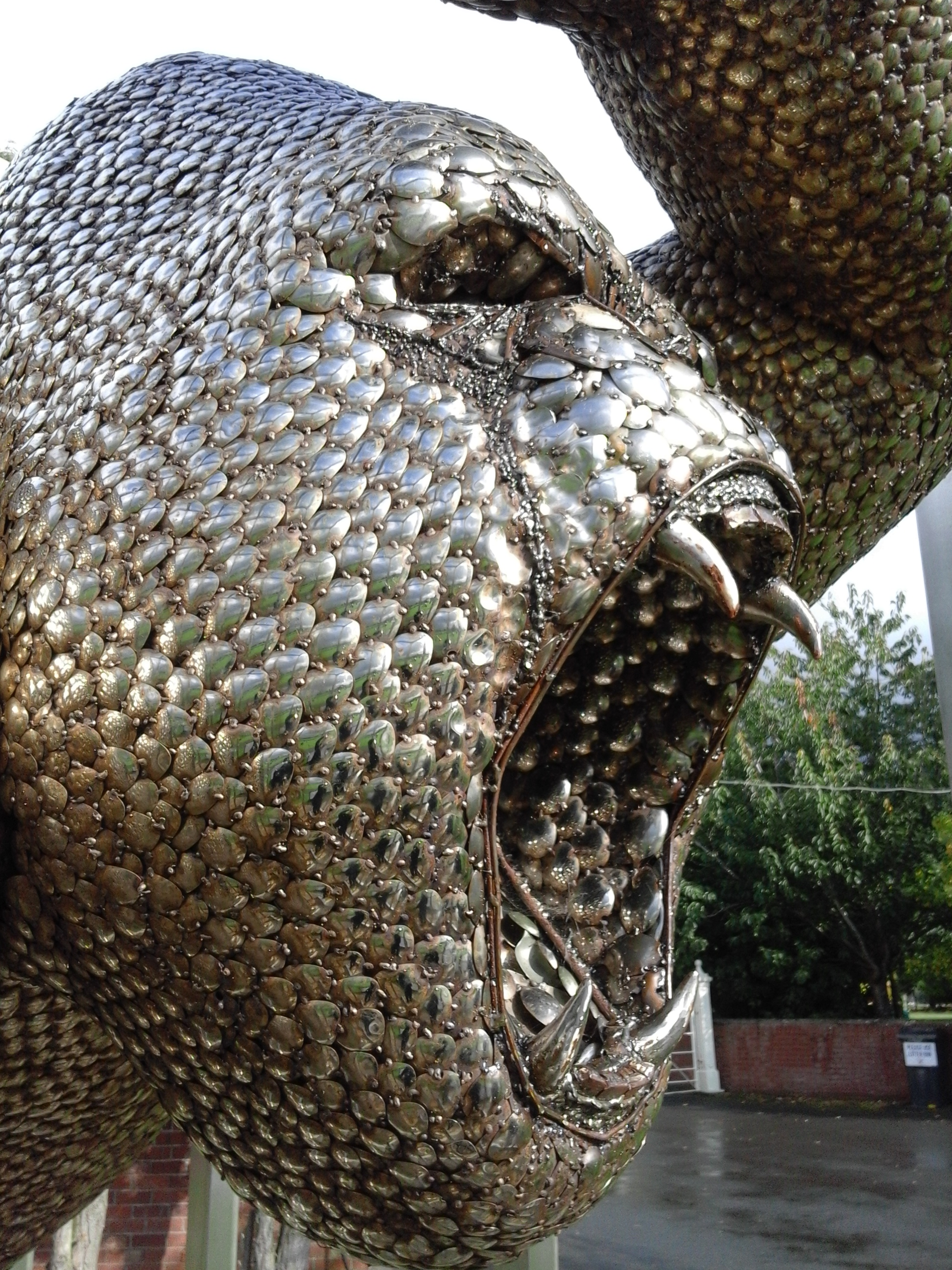
- Metal gorilla constructed from 40,000 spoons at the sculpture park of the British Ironworks Centre

- Location within Shropshire
- Location: Aston, Oswestry, Shropshire, England
- Coordinates: 52.8436°N 2.9933°W
- Type: Indoor/outdoor sculpture park Forge; Visitors centre
- Director: Clive Knowles

The British Ironworks Centre & Shropshire Sculpture Park is a forge, silversmiths and sculpture park with a large showroom near Oswestry in Shropshire, England. The centre is famous for its safari park of sculptures, mostly in metal, and its gorilla made entirely of spoons. The centre is located on the A5 road 3.1 miles (5 km) south east of Oswestry town.

On site, the centre has a shop, café, forge, silversmiths, clock repairer, sculpture park and falconry.

== History ==
In 2013, the centre was asked to create four iron pavilions to celebrate the anniversary of Queen Elizabeth II's coronation. The order came from Buckingham Palace, and the pavilions would be used as entrances to the celebrations being held in its gardens.

The centre have also handcrafted steel forget-me-nots for a charity fundraiser for a Shropshire hospice, the Severn. One thousand of the steel flowers were unveiled in April 2016, and a hasty re-order was required when the first batch of 1,000 sold out within hours.

== Spoons Gorilla ==
In 2013, illusionist Uri Geller commissioned the centre to create a 12 ft (3.7 m) high gorilla from spoons sent in from around the world. Initially 6,000 spoons were donated from across the globe including one that used to belong to Winston Churchill. When the project was complete the final tally was 40,000 spoons from as far afield as China, India, Kenya, Armenia and Tahiti . Whilst Geller commissioned the piece, it was funded by the Ironworks Centre.

The gorilla sculpture was created by sculptor Alfie Bradley over 5 months and was unveiled by Prince Michael of Kent in 2014. The sculpture was taken to Uri Geller's house in the same year, but is now on display back at the centre.

== Knife Angel ==
In 2014, Alfie Bradley and the British Ironworks Centre launched a new incentive called the 'Save a Life, Surrender Your Knife' campaign. This project ultimately resulted in a 27-foot-tall sculpture, Knife Angel. The artist and the Centre encouraged a knife amnesty in conjunction with local police forces across the United Kingdom, to enable them to build/sculpt an angel statue. Initially only 37 police forces responded and sent in knives. Clive Knowles, chairman of the British Ironworks Centre, criticised six police forces across England and Wales from not getting involved with the project. By the project's completion, all 43 police forces contributed to the total 100,000 knives, blades, swords and other weapons used in violent crime. In addition to these blades, one consignment contained explosives that were packaged incorrectly. This necessitated Ministry of Defence bomb disposal personnel being called out and performing a controlled explosion.

The centre and the sculptor have been criticized by some relatives of the victims of knife crime, but have also been praised by others. At least 80 families left personal messages engraved into the blades. The artist was a victim of knife crime himself.

The sculpture was completed in 2018. In the year following its completion, the work was transported on a nationwide tour in order to highlight an anti-violence message. The sculpture is one of hundreds that have been nominated in 2018 for listed status.
