= The Successor (TV program) =

Israeli television competition program

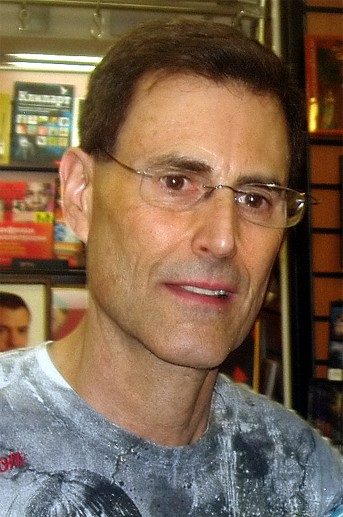

The Successor (also known as The Next Uri Geller) is an Israeli television competition program in which contestants perform acts of mentalism, illusion, escapism and other feats before a live studio audience. The acts are judged by a panel, with votes from the studio audience and viewers at home. The original program was created by Uri Geller in 2007 for Israeli television, with Geller also acting as one of the judges on the show.

The program was subsequently remade in the United States under the title Phenomenon, co-hosted by illusionist Criss Angel. Versions also aired in Germany, the Netherlands, Hungary, Greece, Turkey and Russia. The program has been televised in multiple countries worldwide, including Canada, Latin America, Australia and Finland.

== International versions ==
=== American version: Phenomenon ===
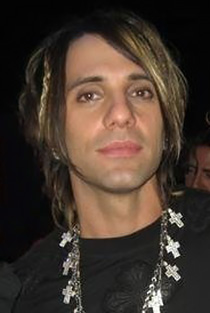
Controversy with Criss Angel on the show

In late 2007, the show was introduced to the United States, under the name of Phenomenon, co-starring Criss Angel, and hosted by British TV presenter Tim Vincent.

The show was notable for the 31 October 2007 controversy when Criss Angel challenged Geller and contestant Jim Callahan to prove they had supernatural abilities. Angel pulled two envelopes from his pocket and said, "I will give you a million dollars of my personal money right now if either one of you can tell me specific details of what’s in here right now." On 21 November 2007, Angel again offered Uri Geller $1,000,000 on the finale of NBC's nationally televised Phenomenon, to which Geller began to discuss seemingly random events which included the numbers 1, 20, 19, 40, and 1. Angel appeared to cut Geller off mid-sentence to reveal the contents of the envelope, which were the numbers 9 1 1.

=== Other countries ===
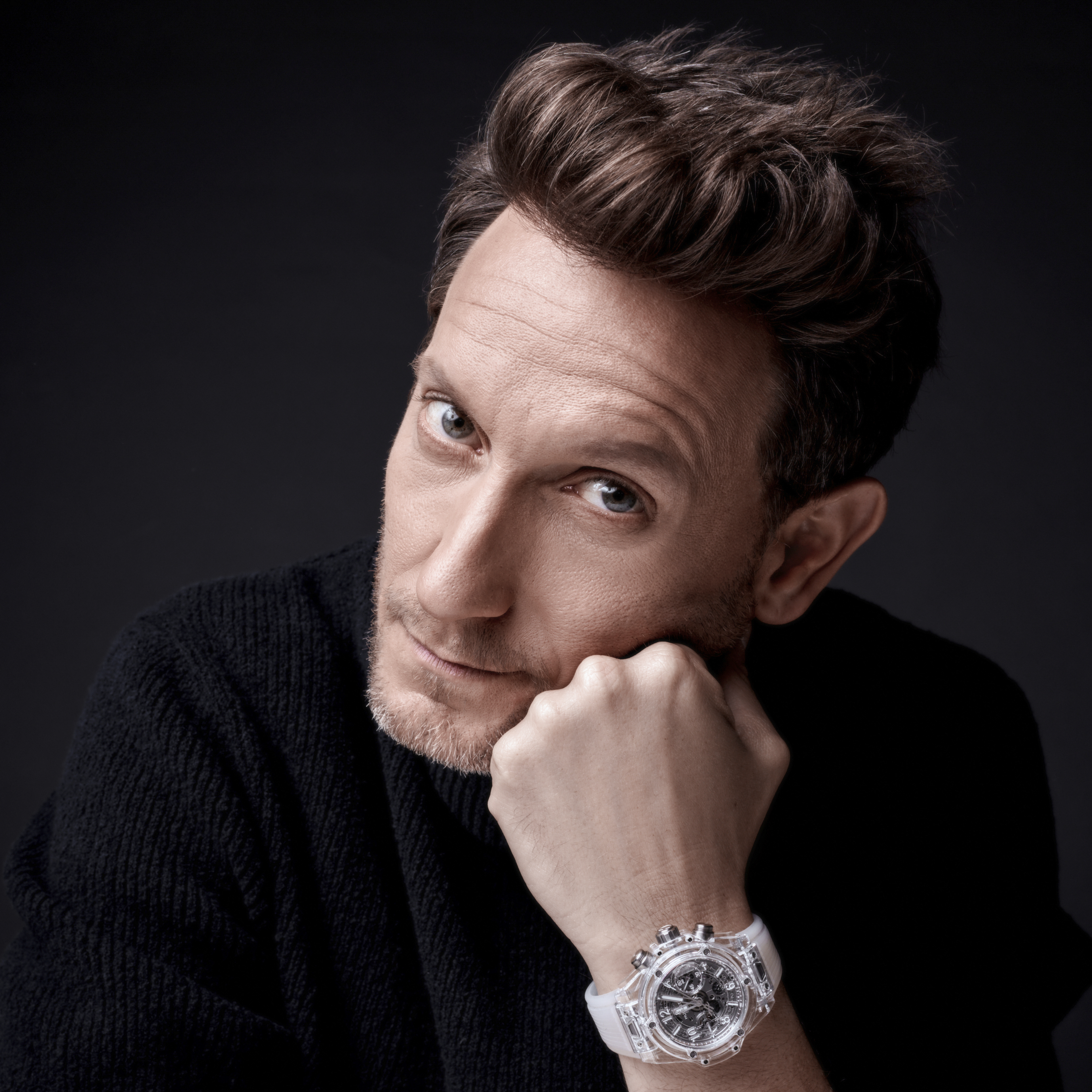
Lior Suchard made his name on The Successor

- Israel: Lior Suchard won the Israeli version of the show. This win proved to be a turning point in Suchard's career as the program was sold and broadcast in various countries, providing him with international recognition.
- Germany: On 8 January 2008, The Next Uri Geller ("The Next Uri Geller – Unglaubliche Phänomene Live"), the German version of the program, began on the German TV network ProSieben, followed by a second season in January 2009.
- Netherlands: The Dutch version of the program titled De Nieuwe Uri Geller ("The New Uri Geller") was launched on SBS6 in 2008, followed by two more seasons in 2009 and 2010. TV personality and former Luv' singer Patty Brard appeared as a regular guest star in the first season and as a co-host with Tooske Ragas in the second and third seasons. Brard was also part of a jury that preselected candidates for the 2010 edition.
- Russia: In September 2008, the live show was launched in Russia, filming live in Moscow.
- Hungary: The Hungarian version of the live show called A kiválasztott – Ki lesz Uri Geller utódja? ("The Chosen One – Who Will Be the Successor of Uri Geller?") began on 29 March 2008. During the show, Geller speaks both in Hungarian and in English.
- Greece: In 2009, Geller started a Greek version called Uri Geller's Successor ("Ο Διάδοχος του Uri Geller – O Diadoxos tou Uri Geller") on the Greek television network Antenna (or ANT1), co-hosted by Christos Ferentinos.
- Turkey: The Turkish version of the show ran on Turkish TV network Star TV, starting April 2008. Ratings were helped by a lengthy article in the Turkish Daily News, under the headline "Famed psychic transfixes Turkish television".
- Sweden: In 2011, Geller hosted a Swedish version called Fenomen ("Phenomenon") on the Swedish Kanal 5.
