= Uri Geller =

Israeli-British illusionist and self-proclaimed psychic (born 1946)

- אורי גלר
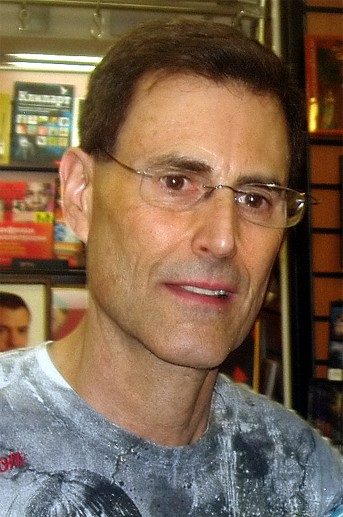
- Geller in 2009
- Born: 20 December 1946 (age 79); Tel Aviv, Mandatory Palestine (now Israel)
- Occupations: Performer, illusionist, self-proclaimed psychic
- Years active: 1968−present
- Spouse: Hannah Geller (m. 1979)
- Children: 2
- Website: urigeller.com

Uri Geller (/ˈʊəri ˈɡɛlər/ OOR-ee GHEL-ər; Hebrew: אורי גלר; born 20 December 1946) is an Israeli-British illusionist, magician, television personality, and self-proclaimed psychic. He is known for his trademark television performances of spoon bending and other illusions. Geller uses conjuring tricks to simulate the effects of psychokinesis and telepathy. Geller's career as an entertainer has spanned more than four decades, with television shows and appearances in many countries. Several magicians have dismissed Geller’s claims of possessing psychic powers, arguing that his effects can be replicated by others using standard stage magic techniques.

== Early life ==
Geller was born on 20 December 1946 in Tel Aviv, which was then part of the British Mandate of Palestine (now Israel). His mother and father were of Austrian-Jewish and Hungarian-Jewish background respectively. Geller is the son of Itzhaak Geller (Gellér Izsák), a retired army sergeant major, and Margaret "Manzy" Freud (Freud Manci). Geller claims that he is a distant relative of Sigmund Freud on his mother's side.

At the age of 10 Geller's parents divorced and his mother moved to Nicosia, Cyprus, where she married a Hungarian Jewish pianist who owned a bed and breakfast there. Her new husband died a year later. After living with a foster family on kibbutz Hatzerim, Geller joined his mother in Cyprus. While there he attended school at the Terra Santa College and learned English. When Geller arrived Cyprus was under British rule before becoming independent in 1960. He witnessed intercommunal violence between Greek and Turkish Cypriots during the Cyprus Emergency, and recalled taking refuge from the scenes of death he witnessed on the beach in Kyrenia with his dog. He returned to Israel at age 16 and worked in construction before joining the Israel Defense Forces at age 18, volunteering for the Paratroopers Brigade. In 1967, he fought in the Six-Day War on the Jordanian front and was wounded in action. He claims that the war injury left him with lifelong weakness in his left elbow. According to Geller, a formative experience of his life was killing a Jordanian soldier in combat near Jerusalem.

Geller worked as a photographic model in 1968 and 1969, during which time he began to perform for small audiences as a nightclub entertainer, becoming well known in Israel. He started to perform in theatres, public halls, auditoriums, military bases and universities in Israel. His first public controversy came in 1970. After Geller had met Sophia Loren in Rome, a public relations agent published a fabricated image of Geller with Loren, and her objections to the image made front-page news in Israel. Assuming that his career was over, he initially asked his manager to cancel his next performance at a theater in Haifa before learning that tickets to the show were sold out. According to Geller, "that’s when I realized controversy, for me, is a diamond on a silver platter."

The parapsychologist Andrija Puharich met Geller in 1971 and assisted him in travelling to the United States. After spending a year living in Germany, Geller moved to the United States in 1973.

== Television and film career ==
Geller became famous demonstrating on television what he claimed to be psychokinesis, dowsing and telepathy. His performance included spoon bending, describing hidden drawings and making watches stop or run faster. Geller said he performed those feats through willpower and the strength of his mind. His apparent ability to bend metal objects during his television appearances came to be known as the "Geller effect" and made him a celebrity. The work of magician and investigator James Randi was the main factor in revealing that Geller's actual methods were stage magic tricks.

In 1973, Geller appeared on The Tonight Show Starring Johnny Carson, an appearance recounted in both Randi's book The Truth About Uri Geller and in the Nova documentary episode "Secrets of the Psychics" hosted by Randi on PBS. In the documentary, Randi says that "Johnny had been a magician himself and was skeptical" of Geller's claimed paranormal powers, so before the date of taping, Randi was asked "to help prevent any trickery"; accordingly, the show's staff prepared its own props without informing Geller and did not let Geller or his staff "anywhere near them". When Geller joined Carson on stage, he appeared surprised that he was not going to be interviewed, but instead was expected to display his abilities using the provided articles. Geller said "This scares me" and "As you know, I told your people what to bring", and "I'm surprised because before this program your producer came and he read me at least 40 questions you were going to ask me". Geller was unable to display any paranormal abilities, saying "I don't feel strong", and expressed his displeasure at feeling he was being "pressed" to perform by Carson. According to Adam Higginbotham:

The result was a legendary immolation, in which Geller offered up flustered excuses to his host as his abilities failed him again and again. "I sat there for 22 minutes, humiliated" Geller told me, when I spoke to him in September. "I went back to my hotel, devastated. I was about to pack up the next day and go back to Tel Aviv. I thought, That's it – I'm destroyed."

This appearance on The Tonight Show, which Carson and Randi had orchestrated to debunk Geller's claimed abilities, backfired. According to Higginbotham,

To Geller's astonishment, he was immediately booked on The Merv Griffin Show. He was on his way to becoming a paranormal superstar. "That Johnny Carson show made Uri Geller", Geller said. To an enthusiastically trusting public, his failure only made his gifts seem more real: If he were performing magic tricks, they would surely work every time.

By the mid-1980s, Geller was described as "a millionaire several times over" and claimed to be performing mineral-dowsing services for mining groups at a standard fee of £1 million. In June 1986, the Australian Skeptic reported that Geller had been paid $250,000 and granted an option of 1,250,000 Zanex shares at $0.20 each until 5 June 1987. However "no diamonds had come from the site identified by Geller."

British television presenter Noel Edmonds often used hidden cameras to record celebrities in Candid Camera–like situations for his television programme, Noel's House Party. In 1996 Edmonds planned a stunt in which shelves would fall from the walls of a room while Geller was in it. The cameras recorded footage of Geller from angles he was not expecting and they showed Geller grasping a spoon firmly with both hands as he stood up to display a bend in it.

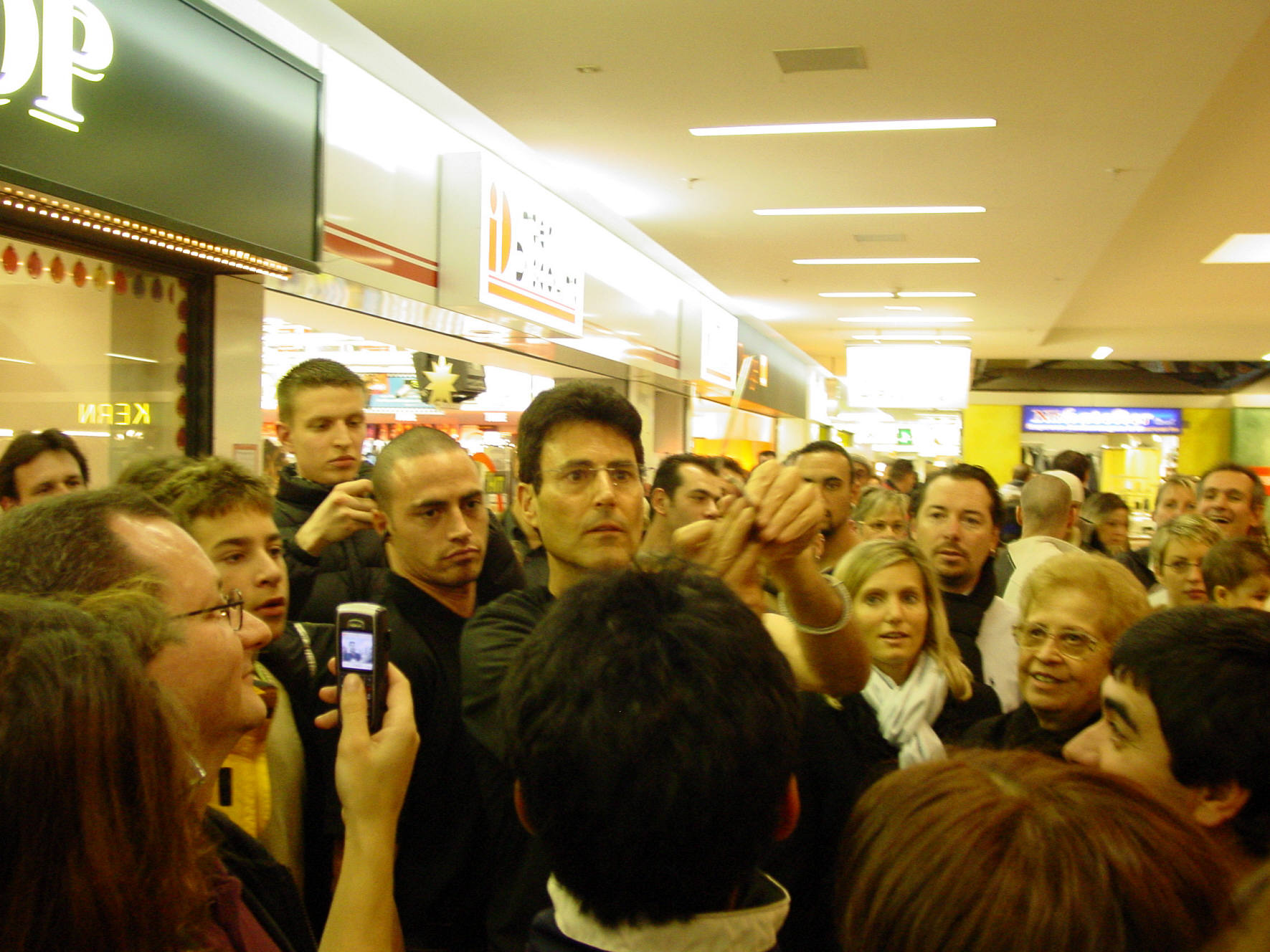
Geller doing a spoon-bending trick in a mall in Switzerland, 2005

Geller starred in the horror film Sanitarium (2001), directed by Johannes Roberts and James Eaves. In May 2002 he appeared as a contestant on the first series of the reality TV show I'm a Celebrity...Get Me Out of Here!, where he was the first to be eliminated and finished in last place. In 2005, Geller starred in Uri's Haunted Cities: Venice, a XI Pictures/Lion TV production for Sky One, which led to a behind-the-scenes release in early 2008 called Cursed; both productions were directed by Jason Figgis. In early 2007, Geller hosted a reality show in Israel called The Successor (היורש), where the contestants supposedly displayed supernatural powers; Israeli magicians criticised the program, saying that it was all magic tricks. Geller said he welcomed the "mystical aura" that the publicity gave him. In July 2007, NBC signed Geller and Criss Angel for Phenomenon, to search for the next great mentalist; contestant Mike Super won the position. In January 2008, Geller began hosting the TV show The Next Uri Geller, broadcast by Pro7 in Germany.

In February 2008, Geller stated in the TV show The Next Uri Geller (a German version of The Successor) that he did not have any supernatural powers, before winking to the camera. He also appeared on the Dutch television program De Nieuwe Uri Geller, which shares a similar TV format to its German counterpart. The goal of the programme was to find the best mentalist in the Netherlands. In March 2008, he started the same show in Hungary (A kiválasztott in Hungarian). During the show, Geller speaks in both Hungarian and English. Geller also performs his standard routines of making stopped watches start, spoons jump from televisions, and tables move. Geller co-produced the TV show Book of Knowledge, released in April 2008. In October 2009, a similar show, called The Successor of Uri Geller, aired on Greek television.

In 2013, a BBC documentary, The Secret Life of Uri Geller – Psychic Spy?, featured Uri Geller, Benjamin Netanyahu, Christopher "Kit" Green, Paul H. Smith, Harold Puthoff and Russell Targ. The documentary claimed Geller became a "psychic spy" for the CIA, was recruited by Mossad, and worked as an "official secret agent" in Mexico, being a frequent guest of President José López Portillo. In the film, Geller claims to have erased floppy discs carried by KGB agents by repeatedly chanting the word "erase".

== Paranormal claims ==
Geller has claimed his feats are the result of paranormal powers given to him by extraterrestrials. The Committee for the Scientific Investigation of Claims of the Paranormal (CSICOP) was a prominent early critic of Geller. Skeptics such as James Randi have shown that Geller's tricks can be replicated with stage magic techniques.

Andrija Puharich met Geller in 1971 and endorsed him as a genuine psychic. Under hypnosis, Geller claimed he was sent to Earth by extraterrestrials from a spaceship 53,000 light years away. Geller later denied the space fantasy claims, but affirmed there "is a slight possibility that some of my energies do have extraterrestrial connection." Puharich also stated that Geller teleported a dog through the walls of his house. Science writer Martin Gardner wrote that since "no expert on fraud was there as an observer" nobody should take the claim seriously.

In his biography of Geller, Uri: A Journal of the Mystery of Uri Geller (1974), Puharich claimed that with Geller he had communicated with super-intelligent computers from outer space. According to Puharich the computers sent messages to warn humanity that a disaster was likely to occur if humans did not change their ways. The psychologist Christopher Evans, who reviewed the book in New Scientist, wrote that although Puharich believed every word he had written the book was credulous and "those fans of Geller's who might have hoped to have used the book as ammunition to impress the sceptics [...] will be the most disappointed of all." James Randi has written that the biography contained "silly theories," but was "both a boost and a millstone to Geller."

In 1992, Geller was asked to investigate the kidnapping of Hungarian model Helga Farkas. He predicted she would be found in good health but she was never found and is widely believed to have been murdered. Geller was a friend of Bruce Bursford and helped him "train his mind" during some cycling speed-record-breaking bids in the 1990s.

In 1997, Geller was involved with Second Division football club Exeter City by placing ‘energy-infused’ crystals behind the goals at Exeter's ground to help the club win a crucial end-of-season game. (Exeter lost the game 5–1.) He was appointed co-chairman of the club in 2002. The club was relegated to the Football Conference in May 2003, where it remained for five years. He has since severed ties with the club. He had also been involved with Reading F.C. and claimed in 2002 that he had helped them to avoid relegation by getting the club's supporters to look into his eyes and say "win, Reading, win.” Reading manager Alan Pardew dismissed Geller's role in the club's survival – which was achieved thanks to a draw in the critical match – stating "as soon as we get a bit of joy, thanks to all the hard work and efforts of my staff and players, he suddenly comes out of the blue and tries to claim the limelight." In a 2008 interview, Geller told Telepolis "I said to this German magazine, so what I did say, that I changed my character, to the best of my recollection, and I no longer say that I do supernatural things. It doesn't mean that I don't have powers. It means that I don't say ‘it's supernatural’, I say 'I'm a mystifier!' That's what I said. And the sceptics turned it around and said, ‘Uri Geller said he's a magician!' I never said that." In that interview Geller further explained that when he is asked how he does his stunts he tells children to "forget the paranormal. Forget spoon bending! Instead of that, focus on school! Become a positive thinker! Believe in yourself and create a target! Go to university! Never smoke! And never touch drugs! And think of success!"

In March 2019, The Guardian reported that Geller wrote an open letter to the British Prime Minister, Theresa May, stating that he would telepathically prevent her from leading Britain out of the European Union. In Geller's words, "As much as I admire you, I will stop you telepathically from doing this – and believe me I am capable of executing it." The United Kingdom left the European Union on 31 January 2020 under the leadership of May's successor, Boris Johnson.

=== Stage magic parallels ===
Many scientists, magicians, and skeptics have suggested possible ways in which Geller could have tricked his audience by using misdirection while bending objects such as keys and spoons manually. There are many ways in which a bent spoon can be presented to an audience so as to give the appearance it was manipulated using supernatural powers. One way is through brief moments of distraction in which a magician can physically bend a spoon or other object unseen by the audience, before gradually revealing the bend to create the illusion that the spoon is bending before the viewers' eyes. Another way is to pre-bend the spoon, reducing the amount of force that needs to be applied to bend it again. Critics have accused Geller of using his demonstrations fraudulently outside the entertainment business. James Randi, one of Geller's most prominent critics, wrote The Truth About Uri Geller explaining how Geller's various alleged supernatural abilities, such as spoon bending and telekinesis, can be easily reproduced by any magician using sleight of hand.

In the early 1970s, an article in The Jerusalem Post reported that a court had ordered Geller to refund a customer's ticket price and pay court costs after finding that he had committed fraud by claiming that his feats were telepathic. A 1974 article in Haolam Hazeh alleged that Geller's manager Shipi Shtrang and Shipi's sister Hannah Shtrang secretly helped in Geller's performances. In Geller's first autobiography, My Story, he acknowledged that, in his early career, his manager talked him into adding a magic trick to make his performances last longer. This trick involved Geller appearing to guess audience members' car registration numbers, when his manager had given them to him ahead of time. Yasha Katz, who had been Geller's manager in Britain, said in 1978 that all performances by Geller were simply stage tricks and he explained how they were really done.

Geller's spoon-bending feats are discussed in The Geller Papers (1976), edited by Charles Panati. There was controversy when it was published. Several prominent magicians came forward to demonstrate that Geller's psychic feats could be duplicated by stage magic. Martin Gardner wrote that Panati had been fooled by Geller's trickery and The Geller Papers were an "embarrassing anthology".

During telepathic drawing demonstrations, Geller claimed the ability to read the minds of subjects as they drew a picture. Although in these demonstrations he cannot see the picture being drawn, he is sometimes present in the room, and on these occasions can see the subjects as they draw. Critics argue this may allow Geller to infer common shapes from pencil movement and sound, with the power of suggestion doing the rest.

Geller admits, "Sure, there are magicians who can duplicate [my performances] through trickery." He has claimed that even though his spoon bending can be repeated using trickery, he uses psychic powers to achieve his results. Physicist Richard Feynman, who was an amateur magician, wrote in Surely You're Joking, Mr. Feynman! (1985) that Geller was unable to bend a key for him and his son. Randi has stated that if Geller is truly using his mind to perform these feats, "He is doing it the hard way."

In November 2008, Geller accepted an award during a convention of magicians, the Services to Promotion of Magic Award from the Berglas Foundation. In his acceptance speech, Geller said that if he had not had psychic powers then he "must be the greatest" to have been able to fool journalists, scientists, and Berglas himself. In October 2012, Geller gave a lecture for magicians in the United States at the Genii Magazine 75th Birthday Bash.

=== Scientific testing ===
Geller's performances of drawing duplication and cutlery bending usually take place under informal conditions such as television interviews. During his early career, he allowed some scientists to investigate his claims. When Geller's supposed abilities were tested by the US Central Intelligence Agency in 1973, the experimenters concluded that Geller had "demonstrated his paranormal perceptual ability in a convincing and unambiguous manner".

A study was commissioned by the United States Defense Intelligence Agency as part of the Stargate Project and conducted during August 1973 at Stanford Research Institute (now known as SRI International) by parapsychologists Harold E. Puthoff and Russell Targ. Geller was isolated and asked to reproduce simple drawings prepared in another room. Writing about the same study in a 1974 article published in the journal Nature, they concluded that he had performed successfully enough to warrant further serious study.

In An Encyclopedia of Claims, Frauds, and Hoaxes of the Occult and Supernatural, Randi wrote, "[Harold E. Puthoff] and Russell Targ, who studied Mr. Geller at the Stanford Research Institute, were aware, in one instance at least, that they were being shown a magician's trick by Geller [...] Their protocols for this 'serious' investigation of the powers claimed by Geller were described by Ray Hyman, who investigated the project on behalf of the Department of Defense's Advanced Research Projects Agency, as 'sloppy and inadequate.'" Critics have pointed out that both Puthoff and Targ were already believers in paranormal powers and Geller was not adequately searched before the experiments. The psychologist C. E. M. Hansel and skeptic Paul Kurtz have noted that the experiments were poorly designed and open to trickery.

Critics of the experiments include psychologists David Marks and Richard Kammann, who published a description of how Geller could have cheated in an informal test of his so-called psychic powers in 1977. Their 1978 article in Nature and 1980 book The Psychology of the Psychic (2nd ed. 2000) described how a normal explanation was possible for Geller's alleged psychic powers. Marks and Kammann found evidence that while at SRI, Geller was allowed to peek through a hole in the laboratory wall separating him from the drawings he was being invited to reproduce. These drawings were placed on a wall opposite the peephole which the investigators Targ and Puthoff had stuffed with cotton gauze. In addition to this error, the investigators had also allowed Geller access to a two-way intercom, enabling him to listen to the investigators' conversation during the times when they were choosing and/or displaying the target drawings. These basic errors indicate the great importance of ensuring that psychologists, magicians, or other people with an in-depth knowledge of perception, who are trained in methods for blocking sensory cues, be present during the testing of psychics. Marks, after evaluating the experiments, wrote that none of Geller's paranormal claims had been demonstrated in scientifically controlled conditions, concluding that "Geller has no psychic ability whatsoever. However, I believe him to be a very clever, well-practiced magician." Marks and Kammann tested Geller's ability to mentally repair watches and found that "many supposedly broken watches had merely been stopped by gummy oil and simply holding them in the hand would warm the oil enough to soften it and allow watches to resume ticking."

== Litigation ==
Geller has litigated or threatened legal action against some of his critics with mixed results. These included libel allegations against James Randi and illusionist Gérard Majax.

In 1971, mechanical engineering student Uri Goldstein attended one of Geller's shows, and subsequently sued the show's promoters for breach of contract. He complained that Geller had promised a demonstration of several psychic powers but had delivered only sleight-of-hand and stage tricks. The case came before the civil court in Beersheba. Geller was not present as the summons had been sent to the office of the promoter Miki Peled, who had ignored it as being trivial. Goldstein was awarded IL27.5 (around $5) for breach of contract. Later, Goldstein admitted that he went to the show specifically with the intention of suing to get his money back, and he had already found a lawyer to represent him prior to attending the performance.

In a 1989 interview with a Japanese newspaper, James Randi was quoted as saying that Geller had driven a scientist to "shoot himself in the head" after finding out that Geller had fooled him. Randi afterwards claimed it was a metaphor lost in translation. The story was also repeated in a Canadian newspaper, which quoted Randi as saying essentially the same thing: "One scientist, a metallurgist, wrote a paper backing Geller's claims that he could bend metal. The scientist shot himself after I showed him how the key bending trick was done." In 1990, Geller sued Randi in a Japanese court over the statements published in the Japanese newspaper. Randi claimed that he could not afford to defend himself; therefore, he lost the case by default. The court declared Randi's statement an "insult" as opposed to libel, and awarded a token judgement against him, paying Geller only "one-third of one-percent of what he'd demanded". Since the charge of "insult" is only recognized in Chinese and Japanese law, Randi was not required to pay. Later in 1995, Geller agreed not to pursue payment of the Japanese fine. Randi maintained that he had never paid anything to Geller.

In 1992, Geller filed a $15 million suit against Randi and CSICOP for statements made in an International Herald Tribune interview on 9 April 1991, but he was unsuccessful because the statute of limitations had expired. In 1994, Geller asked to dismiss without prejudice, and he was ordered to pay $50,000 for the publisher's attorney fees. After not paying in time, Geller was sanctioned with an additional $20,000. Due to the sanction, the suit was dismissed with prejudice, which, according to Randi's attorneys, means that Geller cannot pursue the same suit in any other jurisdiction. In 1995, Geller and Randi announced that this settled "the last remaining suits" between him and the CSICOP. As part of the settlement, Geller agreed not to pursue the payment of the 1990 Japanese ruling, in exchange for Prometheus Books inserting an errata on all future editions of Physics and Psychics, correcting erroneous statements made about him.

In 1991, Geller sued Timex Corporation and the advertising firm Fallon McElligott for millions in Geller v. Fallon McElligott over an ad showing a person bending forks and other items, but failing to stop a Timex watch. Geller was sanctioned $149,000 for filing a frivolous lawsuit.

In 1998, the Broadcasting Standards Commission (BSC) in the United Kingdom rejected a complaint made by Geller, (the BSC) saying that it "wasn't unfair to have magicians showing how they duplicate those 'psychic feats'" on the UK Equinox episode "Secrets of the Super Psychics".

In 1999, Geller considered a suit against IKEA over a furniture line featuring bent legs that was called the "Uri" line.

=== Copyright claims ===
In November 2000, Geller sued video game company Nintendo for £60 million over the Pokémon species "Yungerer", localized in English as "Kadabra", which he claimed was an unauthorized appropriation of his identity. The Pokémon in question has psychic abilities and carries a spoon. Geller also claimed that the star on Kadabra's forehead and the lightning patterns on its abdomen are symbolisms popular with the Waffen-SS of Nazi Germany. The katakana for the character's name, ユンゲラー, is visually similar to the transliteration of Geller's own name into Japanese (ユリゲラー). He is quoted as saying: "Nintendo turned me into an evil, occult Pokémon character. Nintendo stole my identity by using my name and my signature image." Earlier in the year, an expansion pack for the Pokemon Trading Card Game called Team Rocket was released that introduced Dark Pokemon, with one of the cards being Dark Kadabra or Evil Yungerer in the Japanese release. Pokémon anime director and storyboard artist Masamitsu Hidaka confirmed in an interview that Kadabra would not be used on a Pokémon Trading Card until an agreement was reached on the case. In November 2020, Geller issued an apology and agreed to allow cards depicting Kadabra to be printed.

In 2007, Geller issued a DMCA notice to YouTube to remove a video uploaded by Brian Sapient of the "Rational Response Squad" which was excerpted from an episode of the Nova television series titled "Secrets of the Psychics". The video included footage of Geller failing to perform. In response, Sapient contacted the Electronic Frontier Foundation, issued a DMCA counter-notice, and sued Geller for misuse of the DMCA. Geller's company, Explorologist, filed a counter-suit. Both cases were settled out of court; a monetary settlement was paid (but it is not clear whether Sapient paid Geller or vice versa) and the eight seconds of footage owned by Explorologist were licensed under a noncommercial Creative Commons license.

== Personal life ==
After arriving in the United States, Geller lived in Palo Alto, California for a year before moving to New York City. He spent most of his time living in the United States in New York. He also spent a year living in rural Japan in a forest near Mount Fuji with his family on the advice of John Lennon. In 1983, he emigrated to the United Kingdom after a relative suggested that it would be a better place to raise a family. He lived in the village of Sonning, Berkshire, England. In 2015, he returned to Israel, settling in Tel Aviv. Geller currently lives in Jaffa. He is trilingual, speaking fluent Hebrew, Hungarian and English. In an appearance on Esther Rantzen's 1996 television talk show Esther, Geller declared that he had suffered from anorexia nervosa and bulimia for several years. He has written 16 fiction and non-fiction books.

Geller married his wife, Hanna Geller, in 1979. Michael Jackson was best man when the couple renewed their wedding vows in 2001. Geller also negotiated the TV interview between Jackson with the journalist Martin Bashir, Living with Michael Jackson. The interview furthered controversy around Jackson, causing him and Geller to fall out with each other. Geller said they later reconciled before Jackson's death. Following Jackson's death, ITV broadcast an interview with Geller about his association with Jackson, titled My Friend Michael Jackson: Uri's Story, in July 2009.

On 11 February 2009, Geller purchased the uninhabited 100-metre-by-50-metre Lamb Island off the eastern coast of Scotland. Geller claimed that buried on the island is Egyptian treasure, brought there by the Irish mythological figure Scota 3,500 years ago. He claimed that he will find the treasure through dowsing. Geller also claimed to have strengthened the mystical powers of the island by burying there a crystal orb once belonging to Albert Einstein. In 2022, Geller sought to declare Lamb as the Republic of Lamb, a micronation.

In 2014, a 12-foot-tall statue of a gorilla made from approximately 40,000 metal spoons was unveiled in Geller's Berkshire garden by the Duke of Kent, with the intention of possibly relocating it to Great Ormond Street Hospital. The statue was welded by sculptor Alfie Bradley, and funded by the British Ironworks Centre of Oswestry. According to Bradley, many of the spoons were donated by schoolchildren from around the world. Speaking at the unveiling, Geller said "This will not raise money for charity. It will do something better. It will amaze sick children."

Geller is president of International Friends of Magen David Adom, a group that lobbied the International Committee of the Red Cross to recognise Magen David Adom ("Red Star of David") as a humanitarian relief organisation.

In 2021 Geller opened the Uri Geller Museum in Old Jaffa in Tel Aviv. The museum exhibits the personal collection of art and objects that Geller has collected throughout his career. It also features an archaeological display of the ancient soap factory that was discovered during the museum's renovation. At the museum's entrance is an eleven ton bent steel spoon sculpture that was certified by Guinness World Records as the largest steel spoon in the world.

Geller and his wife have two children, Daniel and Natalie. As of 2015, Daniel was a criminal prosecutor in London while Natalie was living in Los Angeles where she worked for a film company and as a part-time actress.

== Publications ==
=== Fiction ===
- Ella. Martinez Roca, 1999. ISBN 0-7472-5920-8
- Shawn. Goodyer Associates Ltd. ISBN 1-871406-09-9
- Pampini. World Authors, 1980. ISBN 0-89975-000-1
- Dead Cold. ISBN 0-7472-5921-6

=== Nonfiction ===
- My Story. Henry Holt & Company, Inc. (1975) ISBN 0-03-030196-3
- Uri Geller and Guy Lyon Playfair. The Geller Effect. Grafton, Jonathan Cape, Hunter Publishing, (1988) ISBN 0-586-07430-9, 978-0-586-07430-5
- Uri Geller and Rabbi Shmuley Boteach. Confessions of a Psychic and a Rabbi. (Foreword by Deepak Chopra) Element Books Ltd (2000) ISBN 1-86204-724-3
- Uri Geller and Lulu Appleton. Mind Medicine. Element Books Ltd (1999) ISBN 1-86204-477-5
- Uri Geller's Little Book of Mind Power. Robson Books (1999) ISBN 1-86105-193-X
- Uri Geller's Mind Power Kit. Penguin US (1996) ISBN 0-670-87138-9
- Uri Geller's Fortune Secrets. (Edited with Simon Turnbull) Psychic Hotline Pty Limited (1987) ISBN 0-7221-3812-1
- Unorthodox Encounters. Chrysalis Books (2001) ISBN 1-86105-366-5
