= Knife bin =

Crime prevention

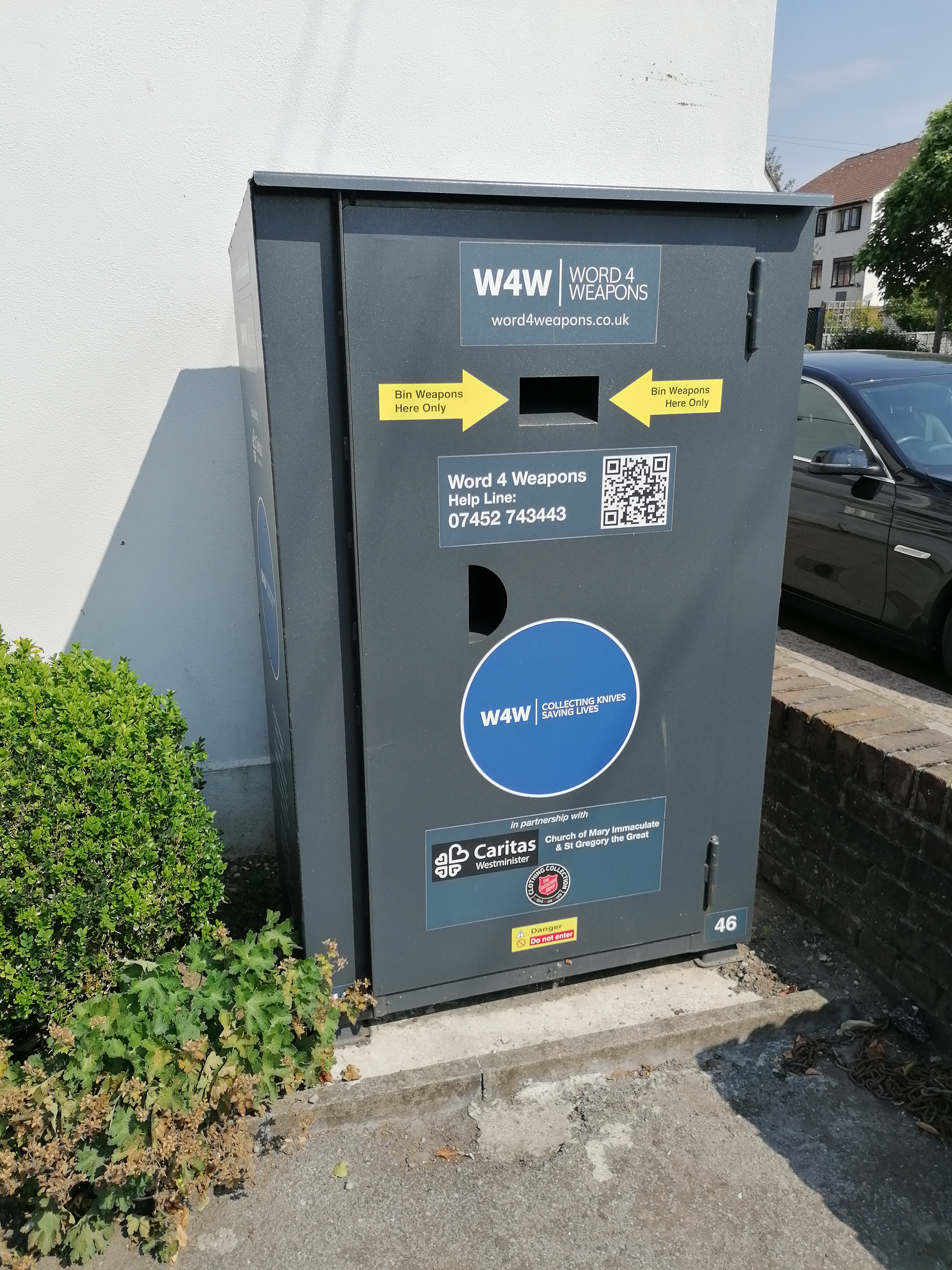
A knife bin in north London

A knife bin, also known as a knife bank, weapon surrender bin, knife amnesty bin or knife amnesty bank, is a place where the owners of knives may dispose of them in a safe and legal way. Knife bins are associated with attempts to reduce knife crime and may be sponsored by the police or churches.

== United Kingdom ==
On 8 February 2006, the United Kingdom home secretary, Charles Clarke announced that police forces in England, Scotland and Wales would hold a national knife amnesty between 24 May and 30 June 2006 in order to "reduce the devastation caused by knife crime." Since then, occasional amnesties have been held in local areas around the country. While Police agencies have observed some reductions in reports of knife crime during and after these amnesties, the effects are usually only short term. There is limited evidence that these amnesties are effective, other than raising awareness of the issues, although campaigners argue they do make a difference.

== Victoria ==
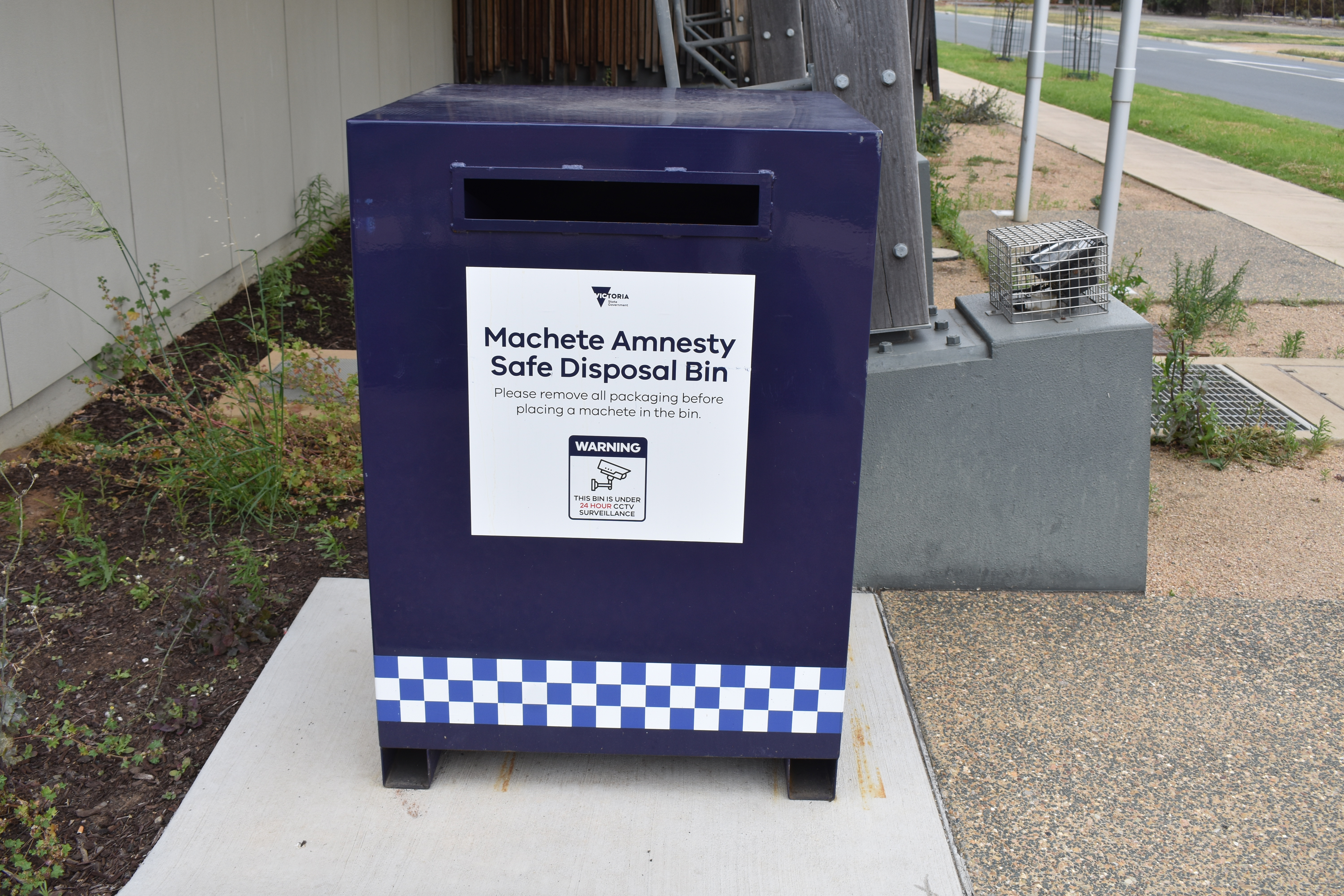
A machete bin in Echuca

A ban on machetes was announced in the Australian state of Victoria in March 2025. An amnesty was established between 1 September and 30 November, allowing machetes to be surrendered to police at designated police stations. At 45 police stations across Victoria, machete bins were placed, allowing for the safe disposal of machetes during the period. According to the Victorian government, each bin cost $2400 to create, with a $925,000 contract awarded to G4S Custodial Services to produce and install the bins. Within the first two weeks of the amnesty period, 1,386 machetes and knives had been disposed through the bins.

== See also ==
- Knife Angel
- Knife legislation
