= CSICon =

Annual skeptic conference in the United States

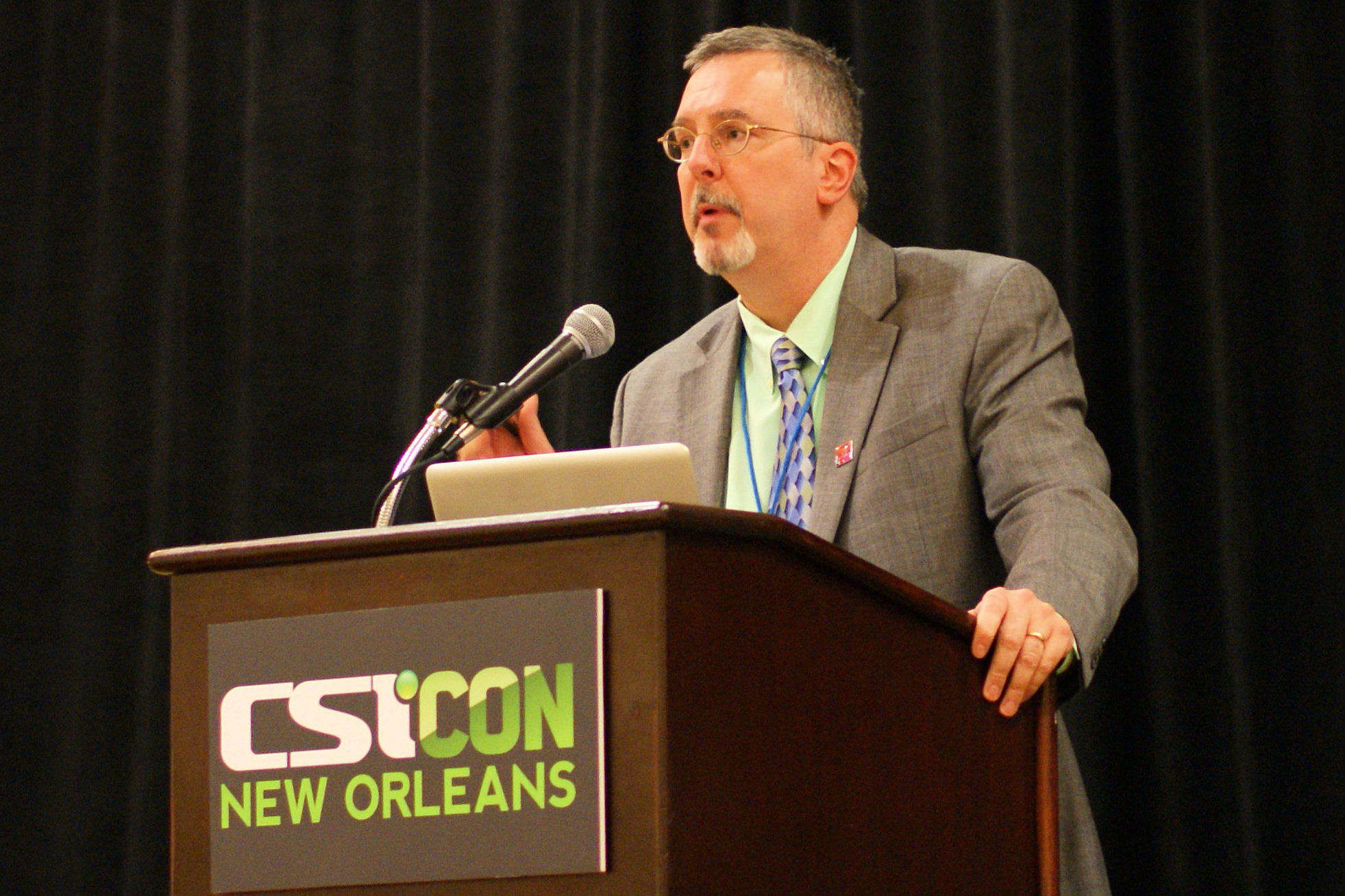
- CSI Executive Director Barry Karr speaking at CSICon 2011
- Status: Active
- Genre: science and skepticism
- Location: Las Vegas since 2016
- Country: United States
- Inaugurated: 2011 (1983)
- Attendance: 500 in 2015
- Organizer: Committee for Skeptical Inquiry
- Website: csiconference.org

CSICon or CSIConference is an annual skeptical conference typically held in the United States. CSICon is hosted by the Committee for Skeptical Inquiry (CSI), which is a program of the Center for Inquiry (CFI). CSI publishes the magazine Skeptical Inquirer.

== History ==
=== 1983–2005: CSICOP conferences ===
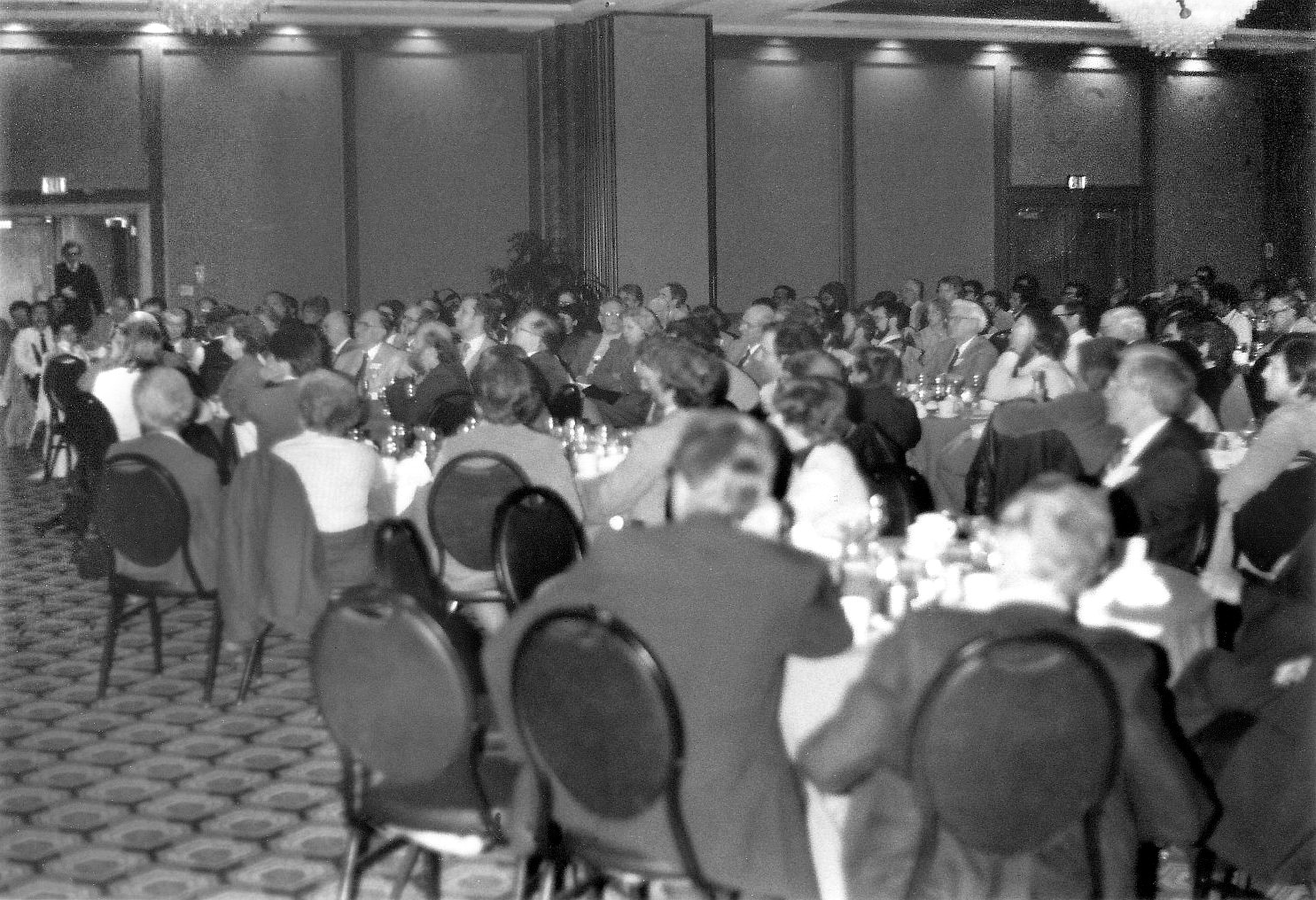
Banquet at the 1983 CSICOP Conference in Buffalo, New York

CSICon's current format stems from 2011, but similar conferences by CSI (until 2006 known as CSICOP, the Committee for the Scientific Investigation of Claims of the Paranormal) go back as far as 1983, when the first was held at the State University of New York at Buffalo (SUNY). The second international CSICOP conference, themed "Paranormal Beliefs: Scientific Facts and Fictions", was held at Stanford University in 1984. The third, the first European CSICOP conference, was held at University College London in Britain, themed "Investigation and Belief".

Throughout the 1980s, the European readership of the Skeptical Inquirer was increasing, while CSICOP members James Randi and Paul Kurtz were visiting several European countries to help found national skeptical organizations with their own magazines. In 1989, the second European CSICOP conference occurred in Bad Tölz, Germany, co-organized by the GWUP and also known as the 1st European Skeptics Congress. It was followed by the formation of the European Council of Skeptical Organisations in 1994, that would henceforth host international skeptical conferences in Europe.

Subsequent CSICOP conferences were always held inside the United States. These included the First World Skeptics Congress at SUNY Buffalo (1996), "That’s Entertainment! Hollywood, the Media, and the Supernatural" with the Council for Media Integrity in Los Angeles (1998), "Science Meets 'Alternative Medicine'" in Philadelphia (1999) and others.

=== 2005–2011: hiatus ===
Around 2005, the CSICOP conferences that were on average held every year and a half, usually at a major American university in conjunction with the relevant faculties such as physics, psychology and philosophy, went into a seven-year hiatus. According to Kendrick Frazier, the organization struggled with its leadership, focus and future perspective, prompting amongst other things the 2006 renaming from CSICOP to CSI, the Committee for Skeptical Inquiry. In the meantime, the annual skeptical conference in Las Vegas, The Amaz!ng Meeting run by the James Randi Educational Foundation (JREF), started to fill the gap and grew larger every year.

=== 2011–present: CSICon ===
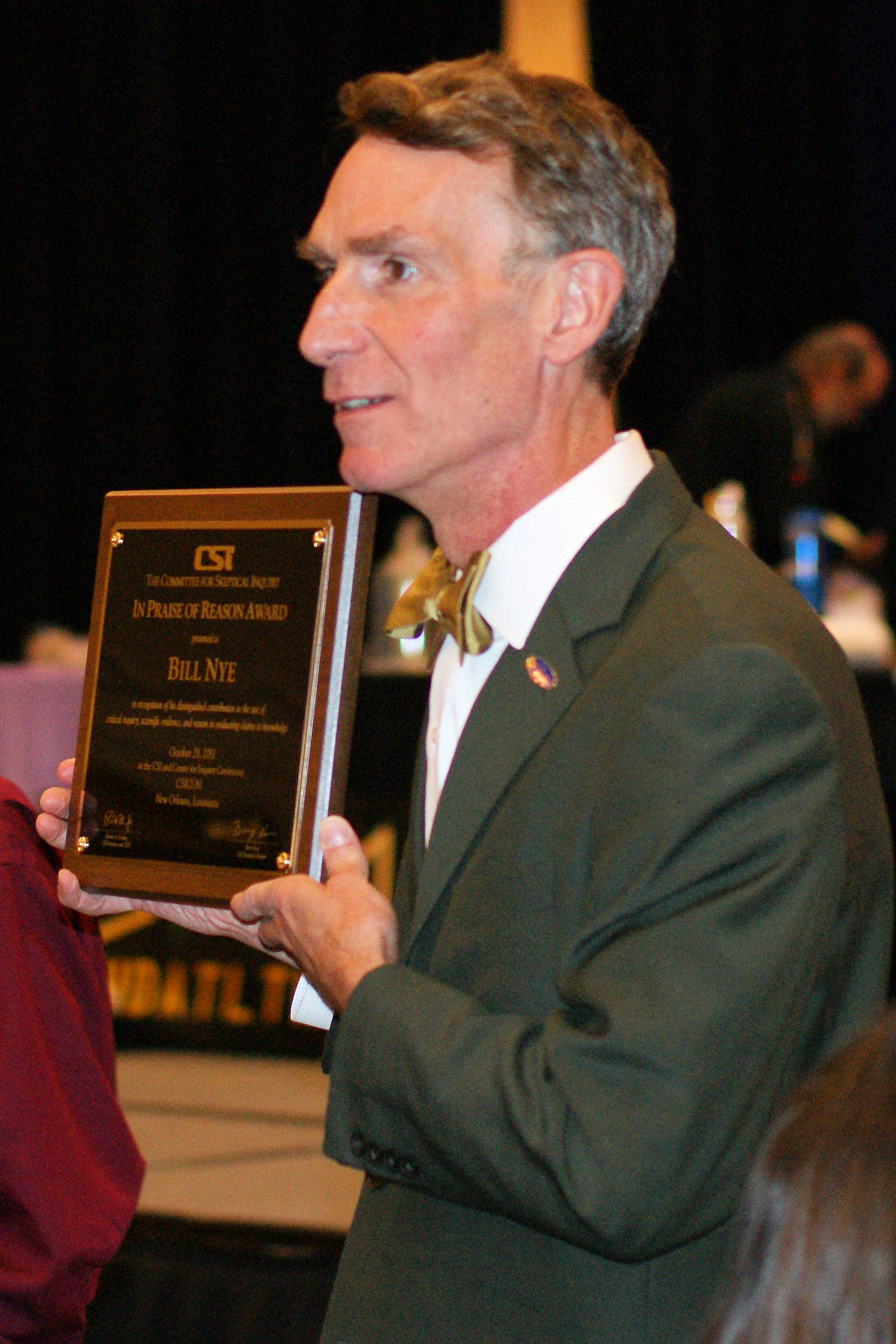
Bill Nye received the "In Praise of Reason" Award at CSICon 2011.

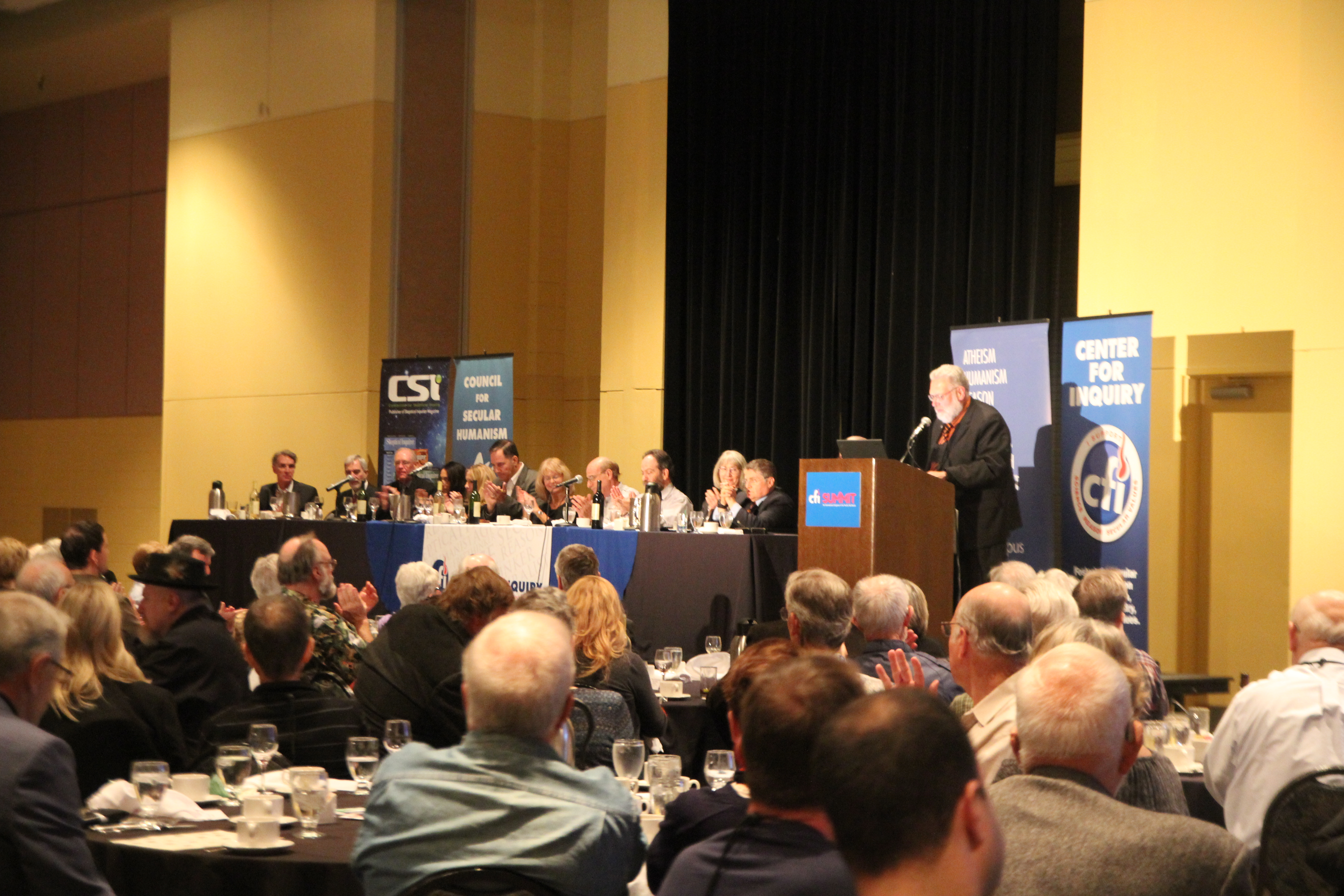
CSI, CFI and CSH gathered at the joint CFI Summit in Tacoma, Washington in 2013.

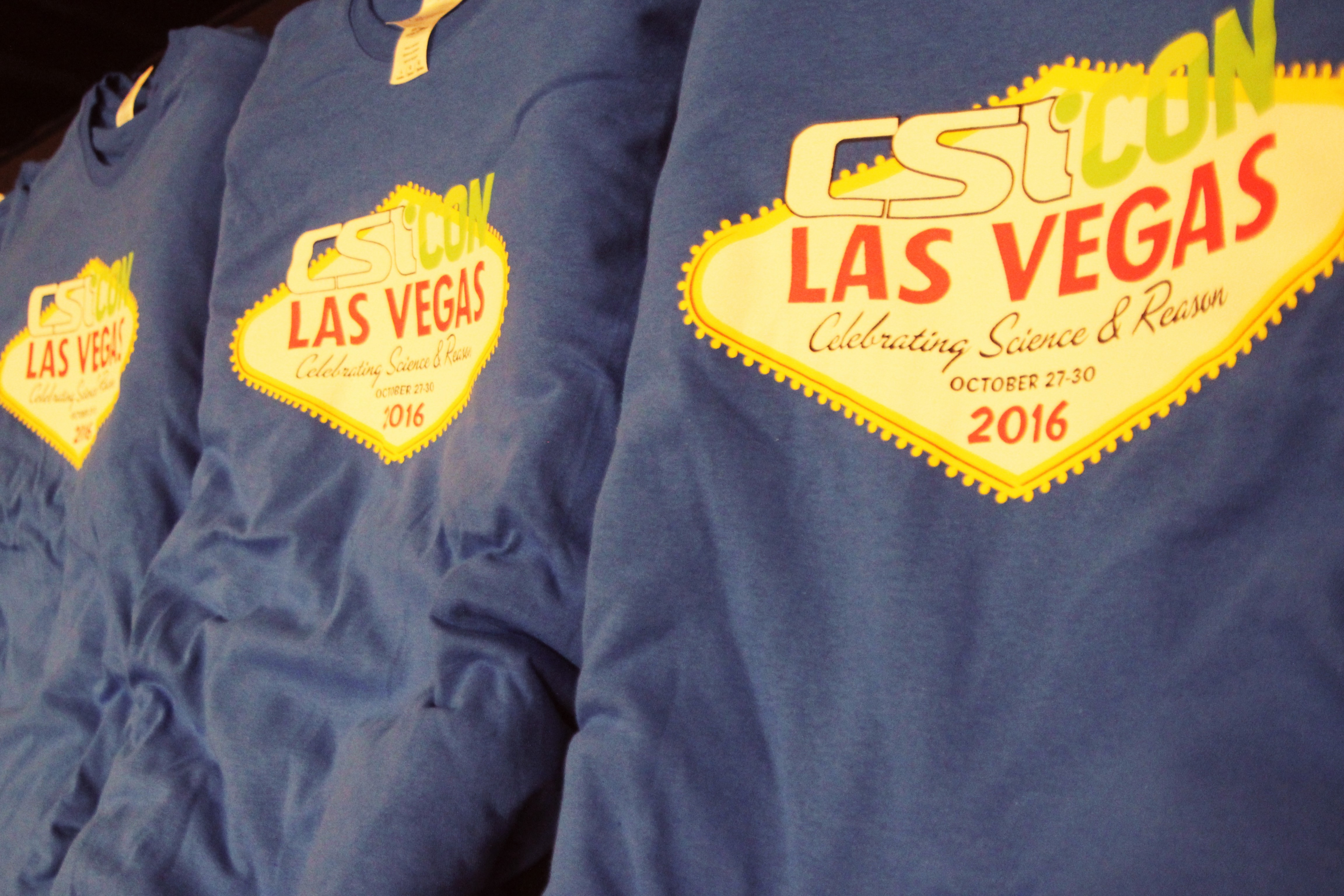
2016 CSICon logo

==== 2011 ====
When CSI stabilized in 2011, it held its first newly styled CSICon in New Orleans, Louisiana. At this first CSICon, Planetary Society president Bill Nye was presented with the "In Praise of Reason" Award for his efforts in science communication with shows such as "Bill Nye the Science Guy" and later series and lectures. Bill Nye is a frequent speaker at the conference, with speaking slots in 2011 and 2013. He also attended the conference in a non speaker role in 2018.

==== 2012 ====
CSICon 2 took place in Nashville, Tennessee, in October 2012.

==== 2013 ====
In October 2013, CSICon 3 was held as part of a larger CFI conference, including the Council for Secular Humanism (CSH), called the CFI Summit in Tacoma, Washington. This combined congress was an experiment, as some people like Ray Hyman and Daniel Loxton feared or argued the goals and focus of skepticism and humanism differed too much from each other to be discussed at a single conference.

On the other hand, Ronald A. Lindsay and Eddie Tabash defended the decision of a joint conference, and Susan Gerbic wrote afterwards she was "completely impressed" by how well the two camps overlapped (citing the creation–evolution controversy as the most important common ground), and "have to work together". In June 2015, again a joint CFI conference was organized under the banner "Reason for Change", with almost 500 people attending. Frazier opined that "[s]cientific skepticism and secularism/humanism blended fairly seamlessly" in Amherst, New York, the headquarters of CFI.

==== 2016 ====
After the last installment of The Amaz!ng Meeting in 2015, Las Vegas was chosen as the location for CSICon 2016 to fill the void.

There are active efforts to bring more students to CSICon, such as by Oregonians for Science and Reason (O4SR) which in 2016 and 2017 gave three scholarships that included conference fees, travel, hotel and food costs.

==== 2017 ====
At The Amaz!ng Meeting in 2011 (TAM 9) the Independent Investigations Group (IIG) organised a tribute to James Randi. The group gathered together with other attendees, put on fake white beards, and posed for a large group photo with Randi. At CSICon 2017, in absence of Randi, the IIG organised another group photo with leftover beards from the 2011 photo. After Randi was sent the photo, he replied, "I’m always very touched by any such expression. This is certainly no exception. You have my sincere gratitude. I suspect, however that a couple of those beards were fake. But I’m in a forgiving mood at the moment. I’m frankly very touched. I’ll see you at the next CSICon. Thank you all."

==== 2018 ====
Hundreds of new attendees to CSICon from the 650 person audience. CEO Robyn Blumner "There were impactful and thoughtful talks but also plenty of humor". According to Barry Karr the highlight for him was watching James Randi in conversation with Ray Hyman, James Alcock and Ken Frazier "discussing the founding of CSICOP (now CSI) and the dawning of the skeptic's movement. I am not sure how you can top a line-up like the one we had,... we certainly going to try next year!"

One Skeptical Inquirer article covering the 2018 conference profiled volunteer Scott Romanowski, who also volunteered at TAM, while another noted a large number of first-time attendees, and included interviews with several of these people from around the world to gain perspective on what they experienced.

==== 2019 ====
For the 2019 conference an effort was made to lower barriers for younger people to experience CSICon to encourage skeptical inquiry amongst a demographic largely absent from skeptical conferences. Susan Gerbic, Mark Edward, Kenny Biddle, John Anglin, Ron Lee and Stuart Vyse visited the Coral Academy of Science to talk to students shortly before and during the conference. The Skeptic community rallied around the cause and more than $4,000 was donated which paid for 16 students and 2 teachers to attend.

==== 2020 ====
The cancellation of the conference in 2020 due to the COVID-19 pandemic led to an online series of lectures entitled Skeptical Inquirer Presents. These sessions included presentations by well known figures in the skeptical community and opportunities for viewers to ask questions.

== Conference details ==
Dates	Location	Name	Speakers	Themes and notes
October 27–30, 2011	New Orleans, Louisiana	CSICon	Bill Nye, Phil Plait, Barbara Forrest, Lawrence Krauss, Harriet Hall, Steven Novella, William B. Davis, Chris Mooney, Karen Stollznow, James Underdown and The Heathens, Joe Nickell, James Randi, Ray Hyman, Massimo Polidoro, D. J. Grothe, Indre Viskontas, Ben Radford, Margaret Downey, PZ Myers, Sandra Blakeslee, Michelle Blackley, Richard Saunders, Kendrick Frazier, Robert Sheaffer, and others.	Theme: "The Conference Dedicated To Scientific Inquiry And Critical Thinking"
October 25–28, 2012	Nashville, Tennessee	CSICon 2	Ronald A. Lindsay, Kendrick Frazier, The Skeptics' Guide to the Universe (Steven, Bob, and Jay Novella, Rebecca Watson, and Evan Bernstein), George Hrab, PZ Myers, James Alcock, Elizabeth Loftus, Indre Viskontas, Massimo Polidoro, Richard Wiseman, Jon Ronson, Sara Mayhew, Eugenie Scott, Dan Kahan, David Morrison, Sharon A. Hill, Scott Lilienfeld, Anthony Pratkanis, David Gorski, Harriet Hall, Kimball Atwood, Richard Lippa, Carol Tavris, and others.	Theme: "The Conference Dedicated To Science And Skeptical Inquiry"
October 24–27, 2013	Tacoma, Washington	CSICon 3 (part of the CFI Summit)	Ronald A. Lindsay, Ray Hyman, Daniel Loxton, Edward Tabash, Susan Gerbic, Barry Kosmin, Michael De Dora, Ophelia Benson, Mark Hatcher, Bill Cooke, Zack Kopplin, Bill Nye, Ben Radford, James Underdown, Joe Nickell, Leonard Mlodinow, Lindsay Beyerstein, Josh Zepps, and others.	Co-organized with the Center for Inquiry as part of the "CFI Summit: A meeting of minds — a call to collaborative action"
June 11–15, 2015	Amherst, New York	Reason for Change (Note: Unlike the 2013 CFI Summit that incorporated CSICon 3, "Reason for Change" was not officially named a "CSICon", although CSI again co-organized it. Instead, it was dubbed "A CFI Conference", while the 2016 CSICon in Las Vegas has been ranked the "4th".)	Ronald A. Lindsay, James Underdown, Kendrick Frazier, Tom Flynn, Michael Specter, Eugenie Scott, Harriet Hall, Steven Novella, David Gorski, Leonard Tramiel, Rebecca Goldstein, Stephen Law, Mark Boslough, Scott Mandia, Jan Dash, Joshua Rosenau, Dave Thomas, Ray Hyman, Scott Lilienfeld, Amardeo Sarma, Barry Karr, and others.	Co-organized with the Center for Inquiry as "A CFI Conference"
October 27–30, 2016	Las Vegas, Nevada Excalibur Hotel	CSICon Las Vegas	James Alcock, Banachek, Julia Belluz, Lindsay Beyerstein, Robyn Blumner, Richard Dawkins, Katie Dyer, Sanal Edamaruku, Mark Edward, Kevin Folta, Kendrick Frazier, Susan Gerbic, Stephanie Guttormson, Harriet Hall, Ray Hall, David Helfand, George Hrab, Ray Hyman, Maria Konnikova, Lawrence Krauss, Ronald Lindsay, Elizabeth Loftus, Michael Mann, Joe Nickell, Paul Offit, Massimo Polidoro, Anthony Pratkanis, James Randi, Joe Schwarcz, Eugenie Scott, Kavin Senapathy, Jamy Ian Swiss, Jill Tarter, Carol Tavris, James Underdown, Bertha Vazquez, and Tamar Wilner.	Theme: "Celebrate Science and Reason"
October 26–29, 2017	Las Vegas, Nevada Excalibur Hotel	CSICon 2017	James Alcock, Teresa Giménez Barbat, Evan Bernstein, Lindsay Beyerstein, Kenny Biddle, Robyn Blumner, Rob Brotherton, Richard Dawkins, Rachael Dunlop, Katie Dyer, Taner Edis, Mark Edward, Kevin M. Folta, Kendrick Frazier, Susan Gerbic, David H. Gorski, MD, Harriet Hall, MD, Raymond Edward Hall, Sheldon W. Helms, Britt Hermes, George Hrab, Ray Hyman, Maria Konnikova, Lawrence Krauss, Michael Mann, Natalie Newell, Joe Nickell, Bob Novella, Jay Novella, Steven Novella, MD, Loren Pankratz, PhD, Massimo Polidoro, Ross Blocher (replaced Carrie Poppy), James “The Amazing” Randi – withdrawn (health), Cara Santa Maria, Richard Saunders, Eugenie C. Scott, Kavin Senapathy, Jim Underdown, Richard Wiseman	Your alternative to alternative facts. Science Moms had its American premiere.
October 18–21, 2018	Las Vegas, Nevada Westgate Hotel	CSICon 2018	James Alcock, Banachek, Kenny Biddle, Susan Blackmore, Mark Boslough, Tim Callahan, Troy Campbell, Timothy Caulfield, Adam Conover, John Cook, Richard Dawkins, Yvette d'Entremont, Craig Foster, Stephen Fry, Susan Gerbic, Jen Gunter, Abby Hafer, Ray Hall, George Hrab, Deborah Hyde, William M. London, Stephen Macknik, Susana Martinez-Conde, Joe Nickell, Paul Offit, Steven Pinker, Massimo Polidoro, James “The Amazing” Randi, Kavin Senapathy, Joseph Uscinski, Bertha Vazquez, Mick West, Carl Zimmer	Bigger venue. Bigger stars. Bigger ideas. Bigger fun. Attendance 650.
October 16–20, 2019	Las Vegas, Nevada Flamingo Hotel	CSICon 2019	Brian Greene, Julia Sweeney, Richard Dawkins, Britt Marie Hermes, Banachek, James Alcock, Kurt Andersen, Jann Bellamy, Kenny Biddle, Janyce L. Boynton, Troy Campbell, John de Lancie, Chip Denman, Grace Denman, Mark Edward, Susan Gerbic, Jen Gunter, Ray Hall, Bailey Harris, Jeff Hawkins, Ray Hyman, Jonathan Jarry, Nathan Lents, Nick Little, Elizabeth Loftus, Leighann Lord, Michael Mann, David Mikkelson, Loren Pankratz, Gordon Pennycook, Piff the Magic Dragon, Seth Shostak, Jim Underdown, Kavin Senapathy, Joe Schwarcz	Let's seize the moment! Attendance 646
October 15–18, 2020	Las Vegas, Nevada Westgate Hotel	CSICon 2020	Cancelled due to COVID-19	
October 21–24, 2021	Las Vegas, Nevada Flamingo Hotel	CSICon 2021	Cancelled due to uncertainty of COVID-19 safety	
October 2022	Las Vegas, Nevada Flamingo Hotel	CSICon 2022	Kenny Biddle, Timothy Caulfield, Richard Dawkins, Susan Gerbic, David Robert Grimes, Lee McIntyre, Nathan Lents, Nick Little, Naomi Oreskes, Penn Jillette, John Petrocelli, Julia Sweeney, Eddie Tabash, Nick Tiller, Neil deGrasse Tyson, Joseph Uscinski, Odaelys Walwyn-Pollard, Richard Wiseman, Seema Yasmin	
October 2023	Las Vegas, Nevada Flamingo Hotel	CSICon 2023	Kenny Biddle, Robyn Blumner, Laura Davis, Richard Dawkins, Dustin Dean, Kathleen Dyer, Erika Engelhaupt, Dave Farina, Paul Fidalgo, Craig Foster, Tjardus Greidanus, Raymond Edward Hall, George Hrab, Stephen Hupp, Glenn Kessler, Leighann Lord, Paul Offit, Naomi Oreskes, Natalia Pasternak, Penn & Teller, Massimo Polidoro, Rina Raphael, Eugenie Scott, Eddie Tabash, Melanie Trecek-King, Jim Underdown, Bertha Vazquez, Stuart Vyse, Mick West, Richard Wiseman, Seema Yasmin	
October 24–27, 2024	Las Vegas, Nevada Horseshoe Las Vegas	CSICon 2024	Neil deGrasse Tyson, Brian Cox (physicist), Banachek, Michael Mann, David McRaney, Jerry Coyne, Natalia Pasternak, Massimo Pigliucci, Rina Raphael, Richard Saunders, Daniel Simons, Eddie Tabash, Nick Tiller, Melanie Trecek-King, Jim Underdown, Forrest Valkai	
June 11-14 2026	Buffalo, New York, Buffalo Convention Center	CSICon 2026	James Alcock, Meagan Ankney, Banachek, Evan Bernstein, Kenny Biddle, Timothy Binga, Robyn Blumner, Alejandro Borgo, Pamela Brunskill, Brain Bushwood, Perry Carpenter, Brian Dunning, Michael Edwards, Ruth Frazier, Susan Gerbic, Raymond Hall, Peter Hotez, George Hrab, Stephen Hupp, Leo Igwe, Barry Karr, Scott Hamilton Kennedy, Ronald A. Lindsay, Leighann Lord, Andrea Love, Malorie Mackey, Michael Mann, Jon Michael, Bob Novella, Jay Novella, Steven Novella, Bill Nye, Rob Palmer, Ben Radford, Rina Raphael, Timothy Redmond, Daniel Reed, Mary Roach, Cara Santa Maria, Amardeo Sarma, Richard Saunders, Eugenie Scott, Sammy Shuster, Katie Suleta, Eddie Tabash, Nick Tiller, Anthony Trecek-King, Melanie Trecek-King, Jim Underdown, Bertha Vazquez, Stuart Vyse, Coleman Watts, Dan Wilson, Richard Wiseman, Justin Robert Young, Zhang Zhimin	50th anniversary of CFI Celebrate Our History...Chart our Future
July 15-18 2027	Philadelphia	CSICon 2027		

=== Sunday Morning Papers Session ===
From 2016 onward, following the end of The Amaz!ng Skeptic conferences where they first took place, CSI started having its own Sunday Morning Papers Session: fifteen-minutes presentations pertaining to a wide range of topics that are typically not otherwise discussed. They are self-described as "an opportunity for anyone with specific expertise to lend their skills to the [skeptical] movement", provided the proposals pass vetting, which requires them to be well researched. For this, they should "contain citations, introduce new data and analysis and discuss successes in media outreach", and all assertions must be rooted in evidence. Grassroots skeptics's credentials are furthermore checked to see that they match the content of their paper proposal.

Skeptical Inquirer columnist Rob Palmer wrote an article titled, "So, You Want To Speak At CSICon?" which describes his experience of applying for and being accepted as a speaker for the 2018 Sunday Morning Papers Session. The article is aimed at those who are "considering submitting a proposal for the chance to address the conference – or are even just curious as to what the application experience is like."

== Gallery ==
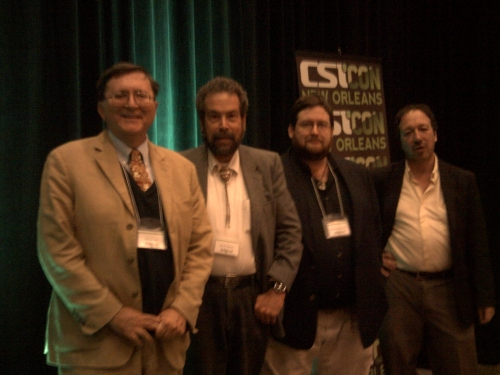
CSICon 1 conspiracy panel: Ted Goertzel, Dave Thomas, Bob Blaskiewicz and Scott Lilienfeld

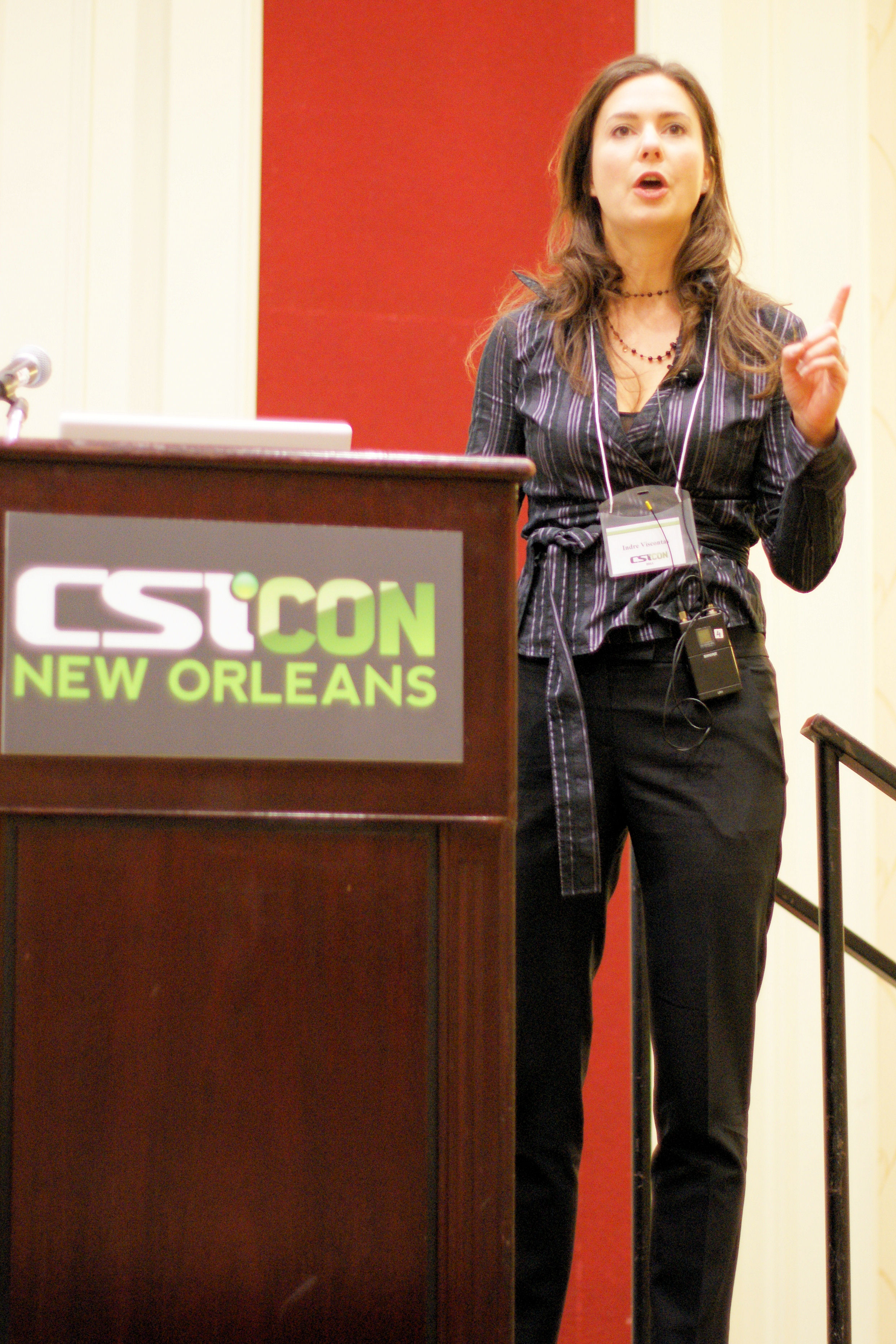
Indre Viskontas leading the Skepticism and the Media Panel CSICon 1

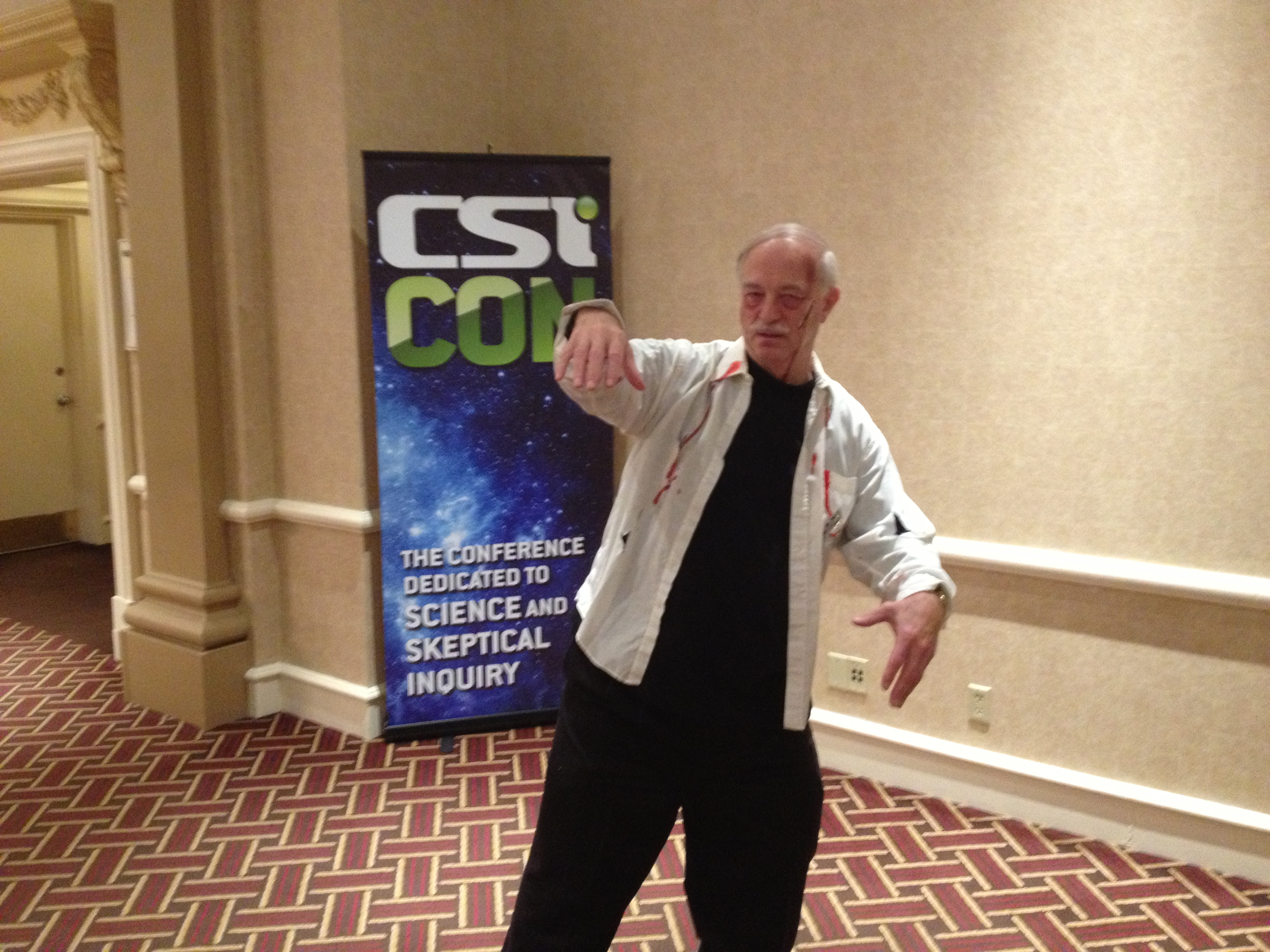
Joe Nickell as a zombie at CSICon 2

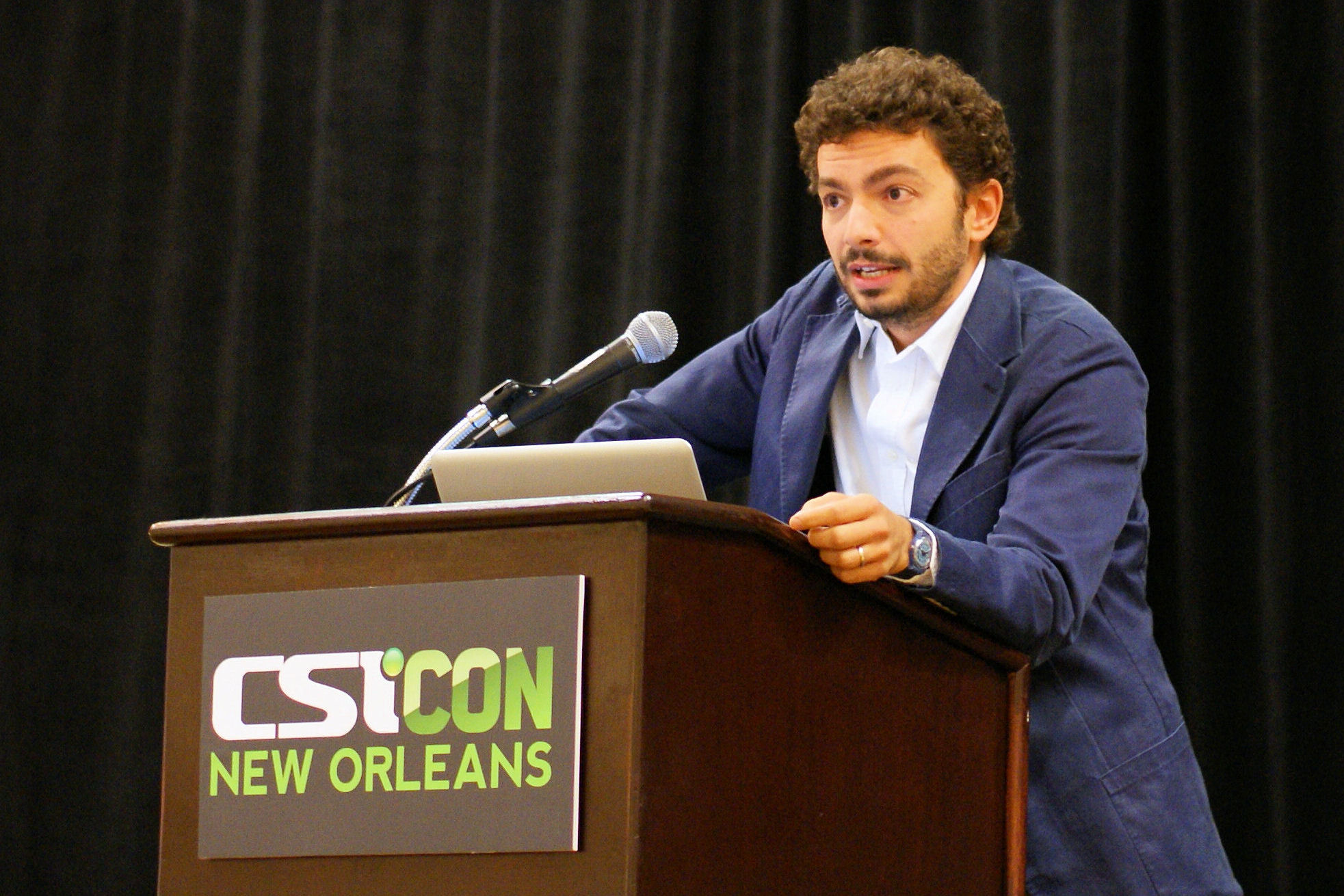
Massimo Polidoro participating in "The Investigators" panel at CSICon 2011 in New Orleans

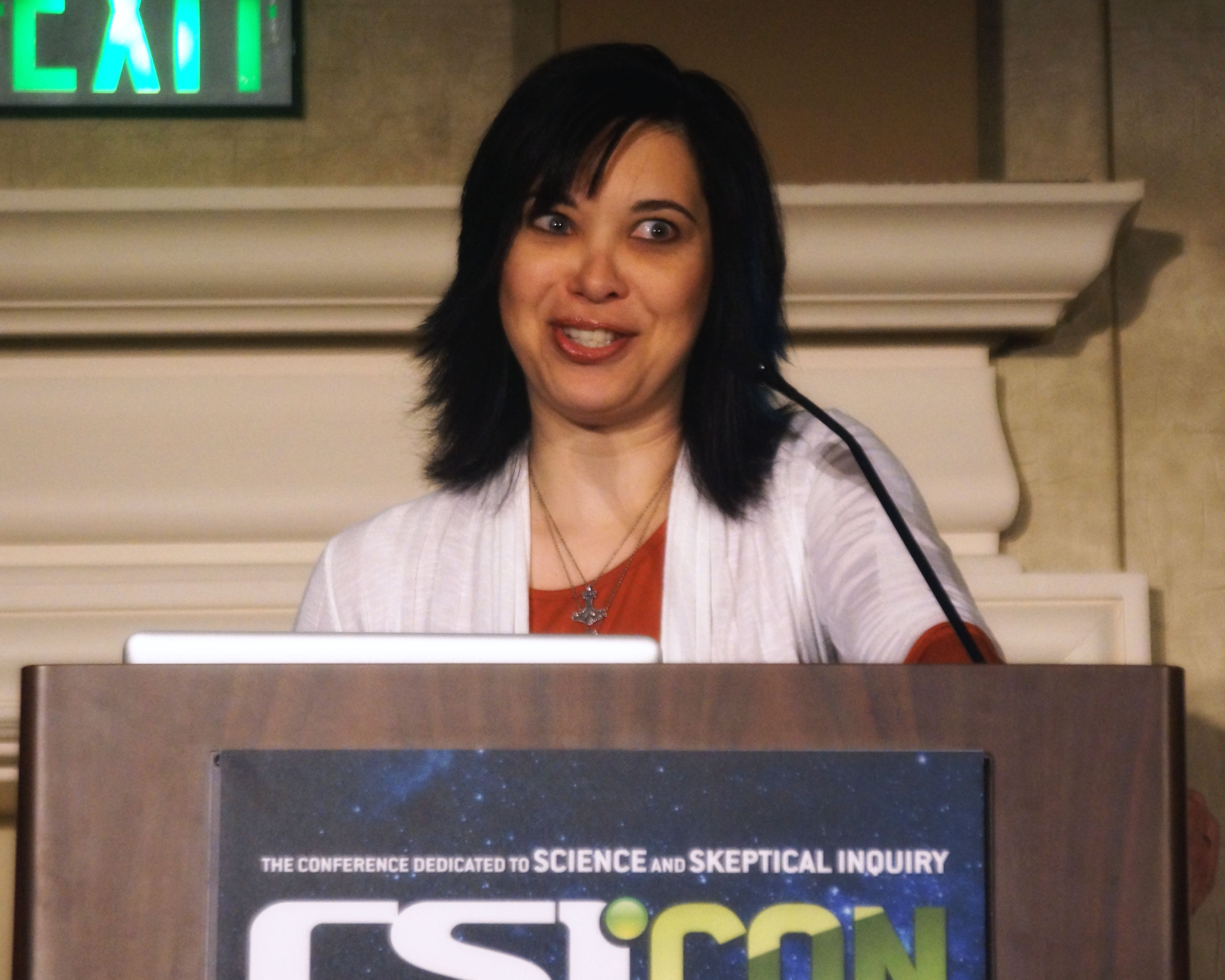
Sharon Hill speaking about weird news at CSICon 2

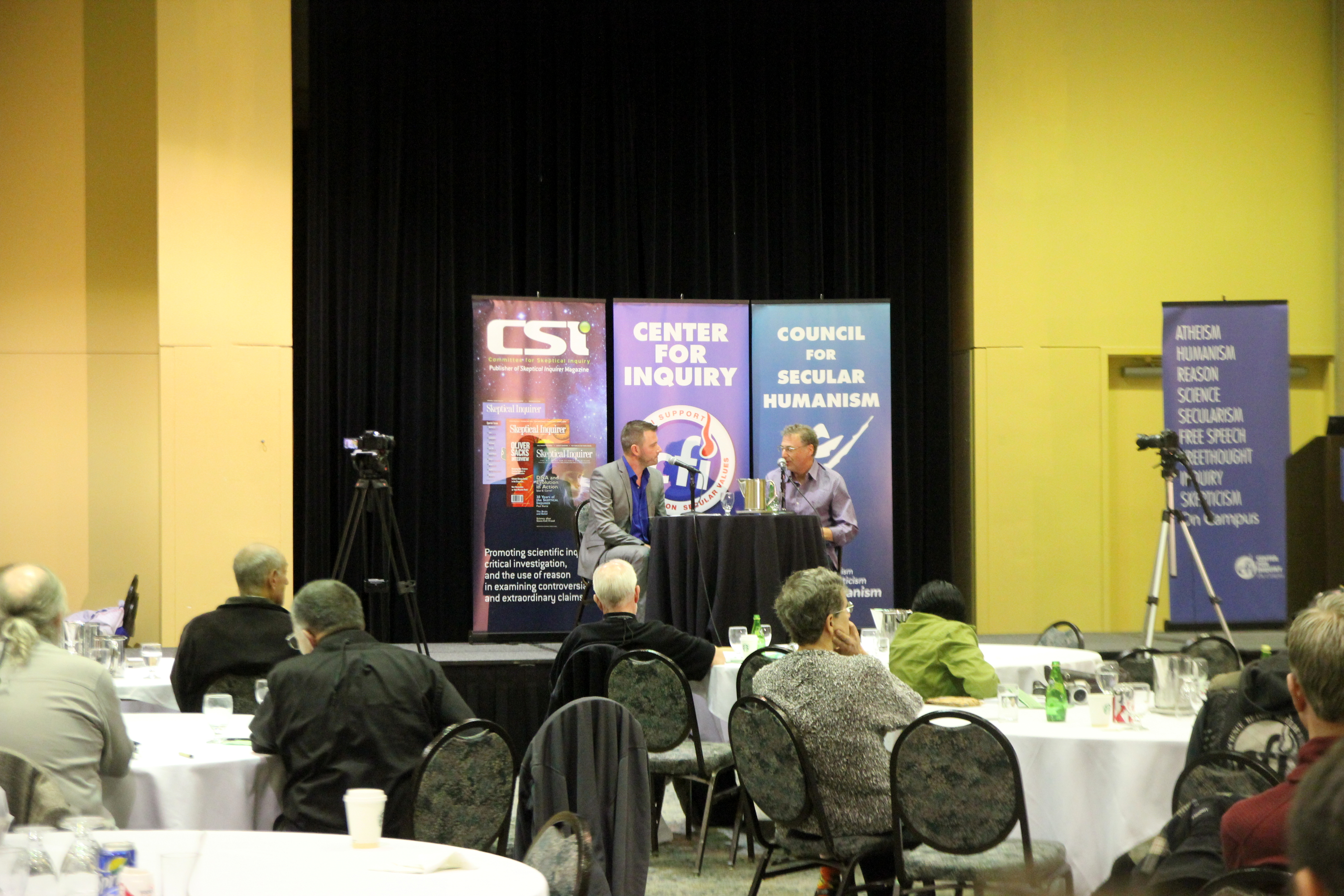
Point of Inquiry host Josh Zepps interviews Leonard Mlodinow at CFI Summit 2013.

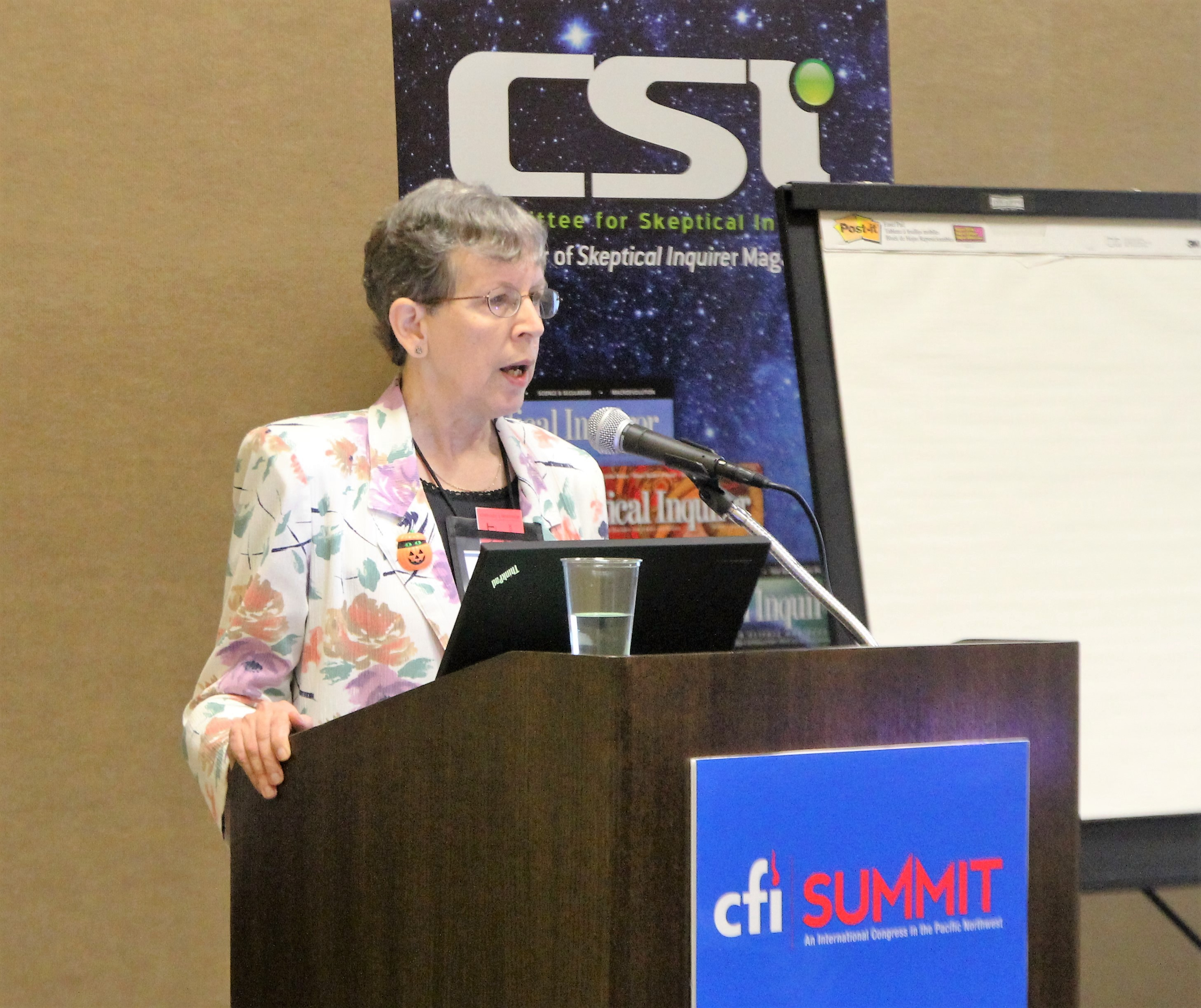
Harriet Hall, a frequent CSICon speaker, in Tacoma 2013

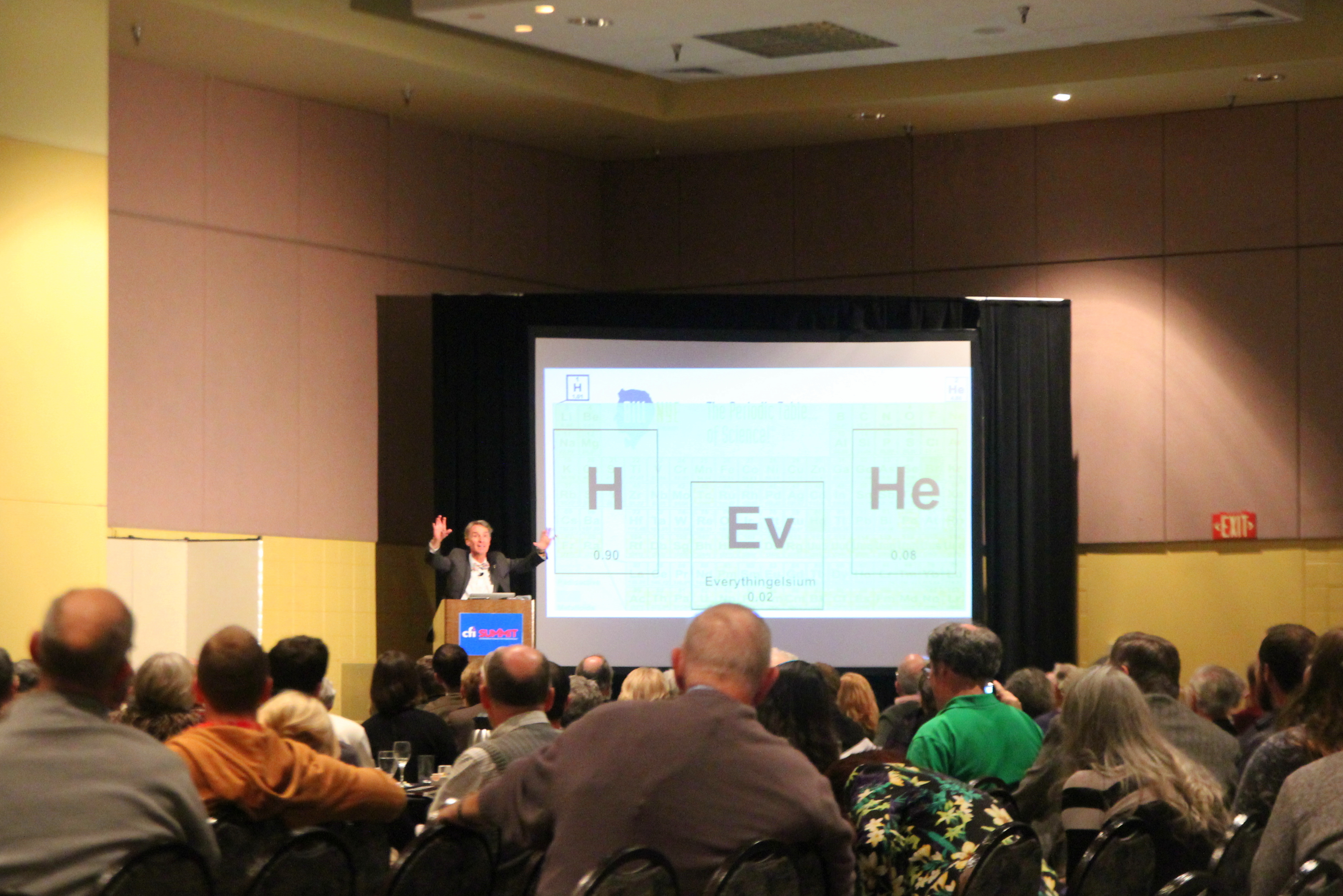
Bill Nye lectures at CFI Summit 2013.

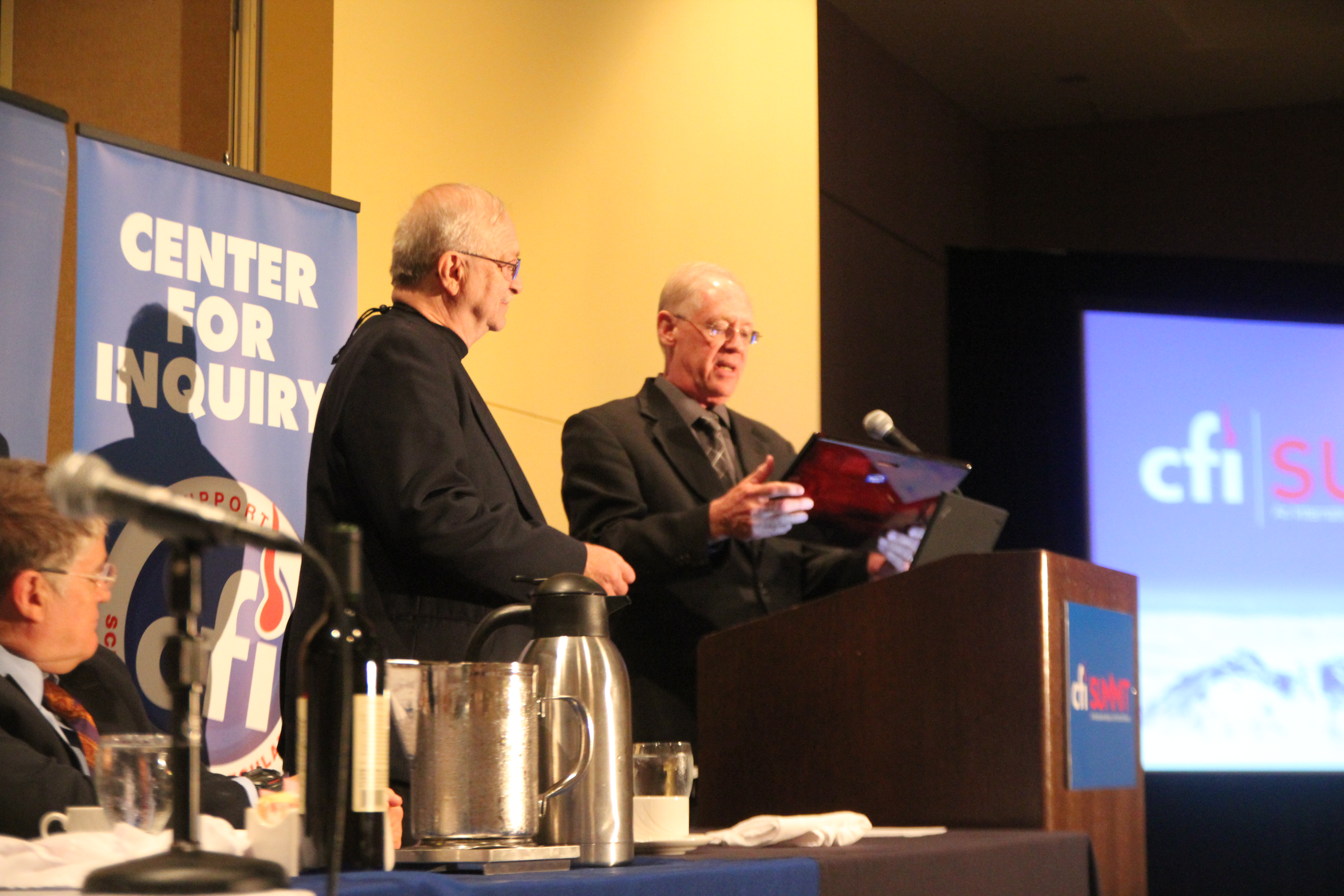
Joe Nickell receives the Robert Balles Prize.

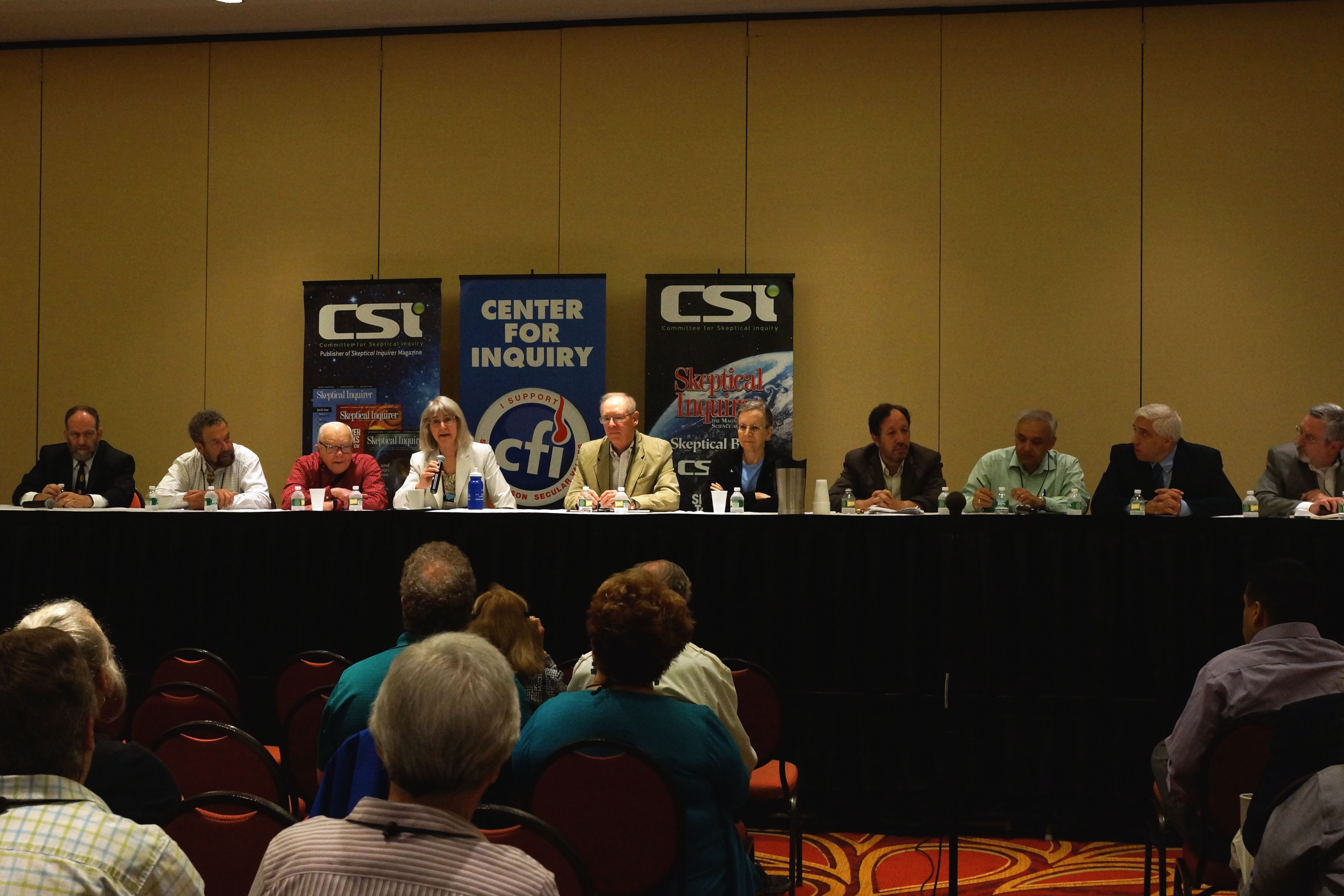
Public CSI–CFI–CSH board gathering at Reason for Change

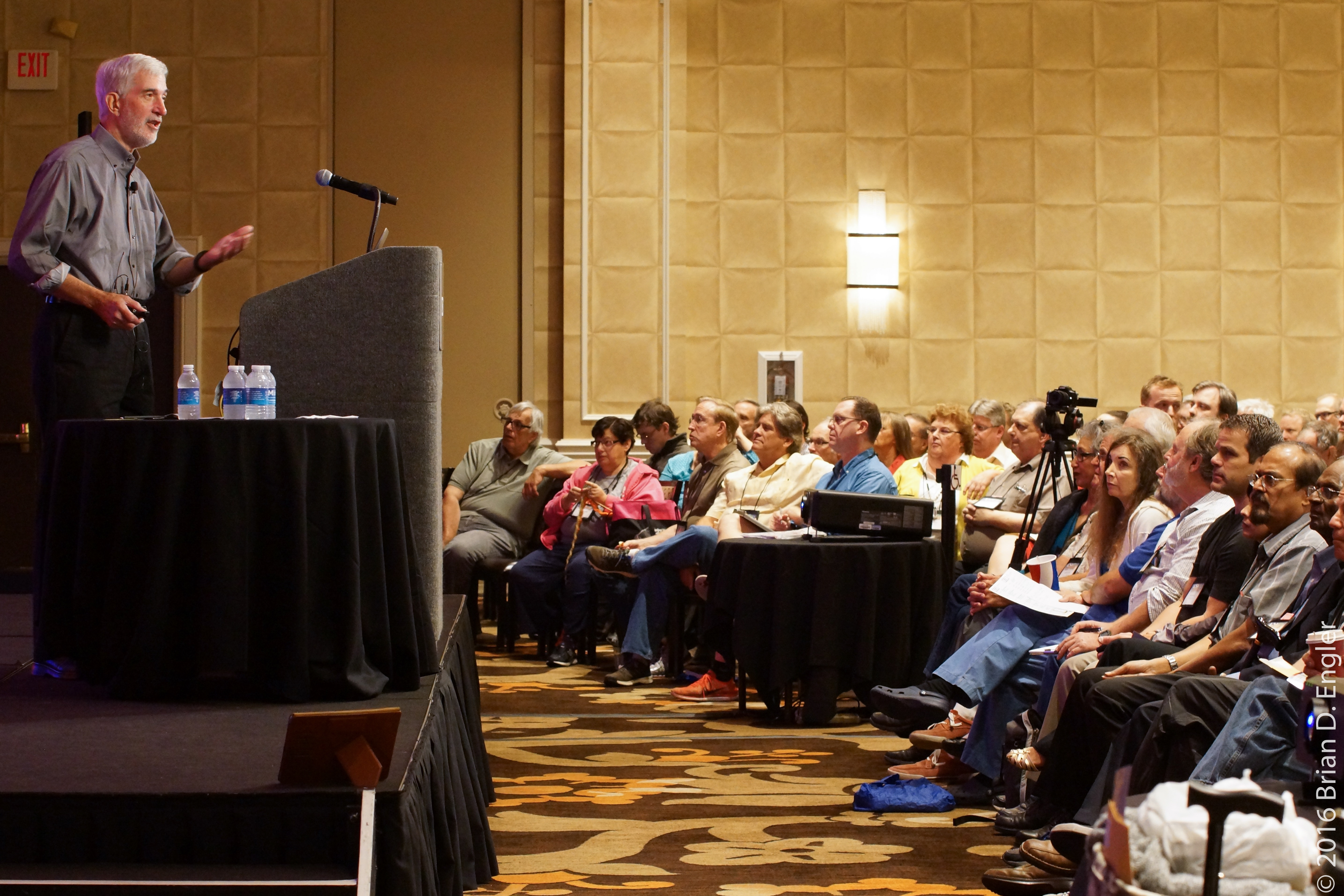
Ron Lindsay "Why Skepticism?" 2016

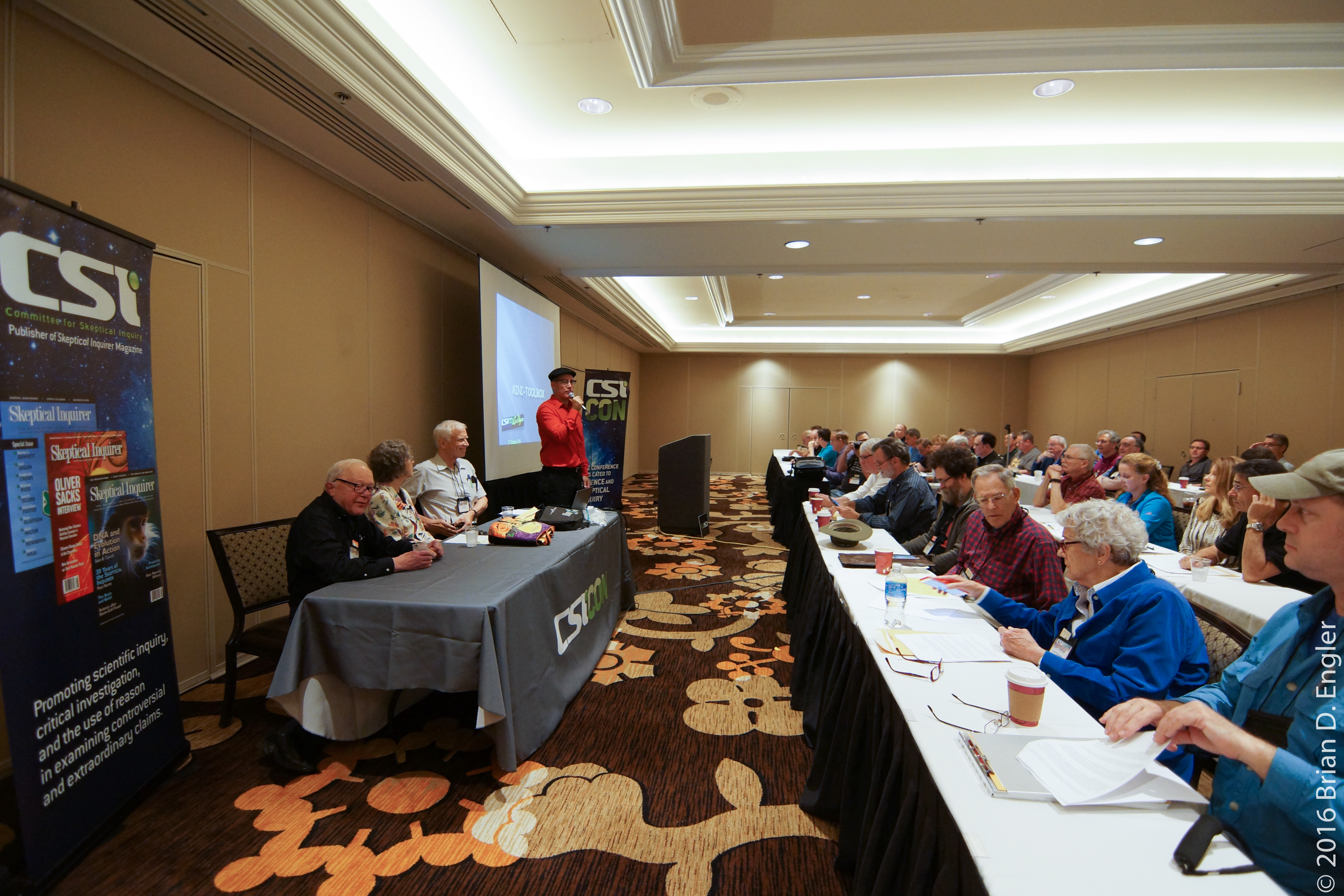
Mini Skeptic's Toolbox 2016

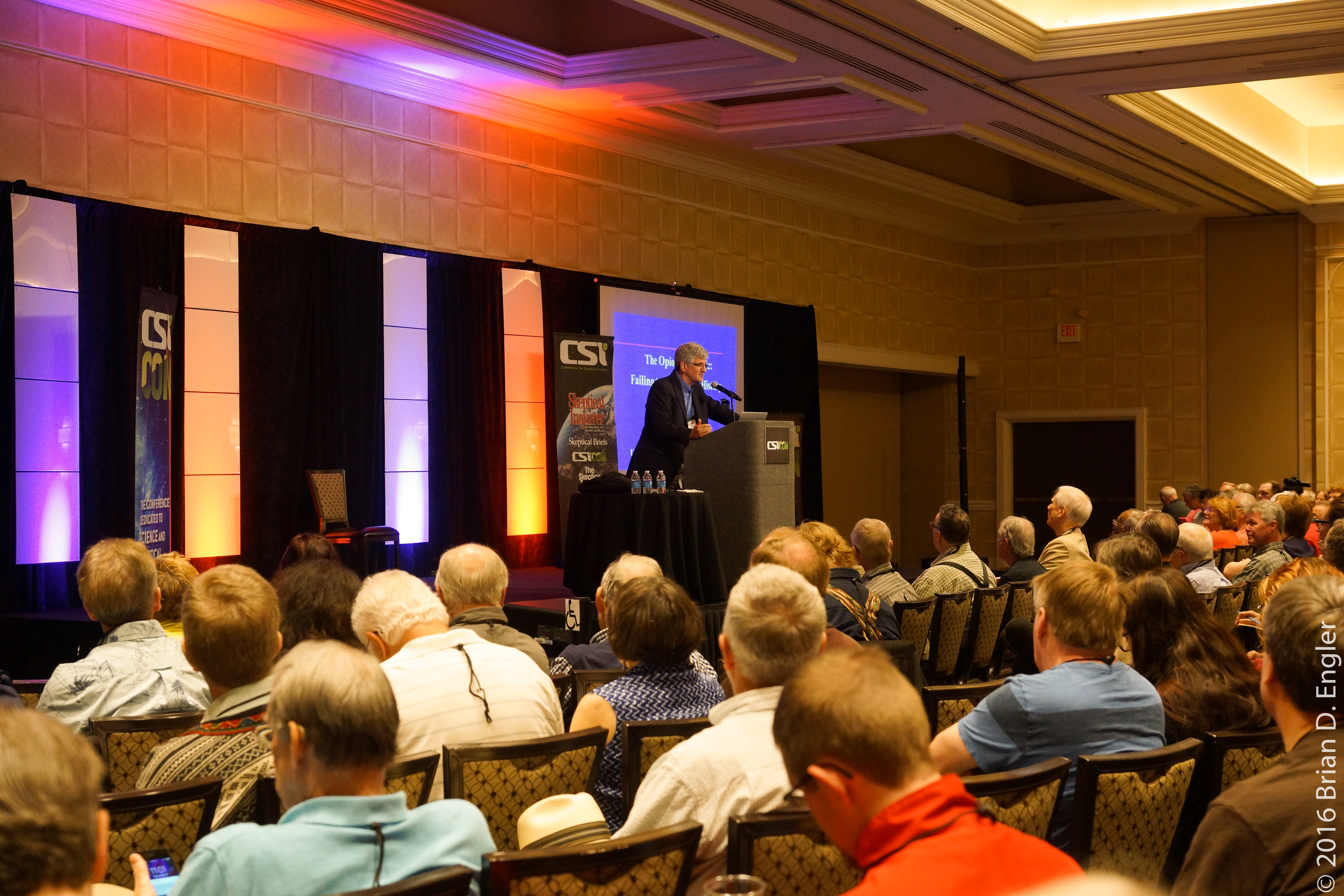
Paul Offit "Opioids" lecture 2016

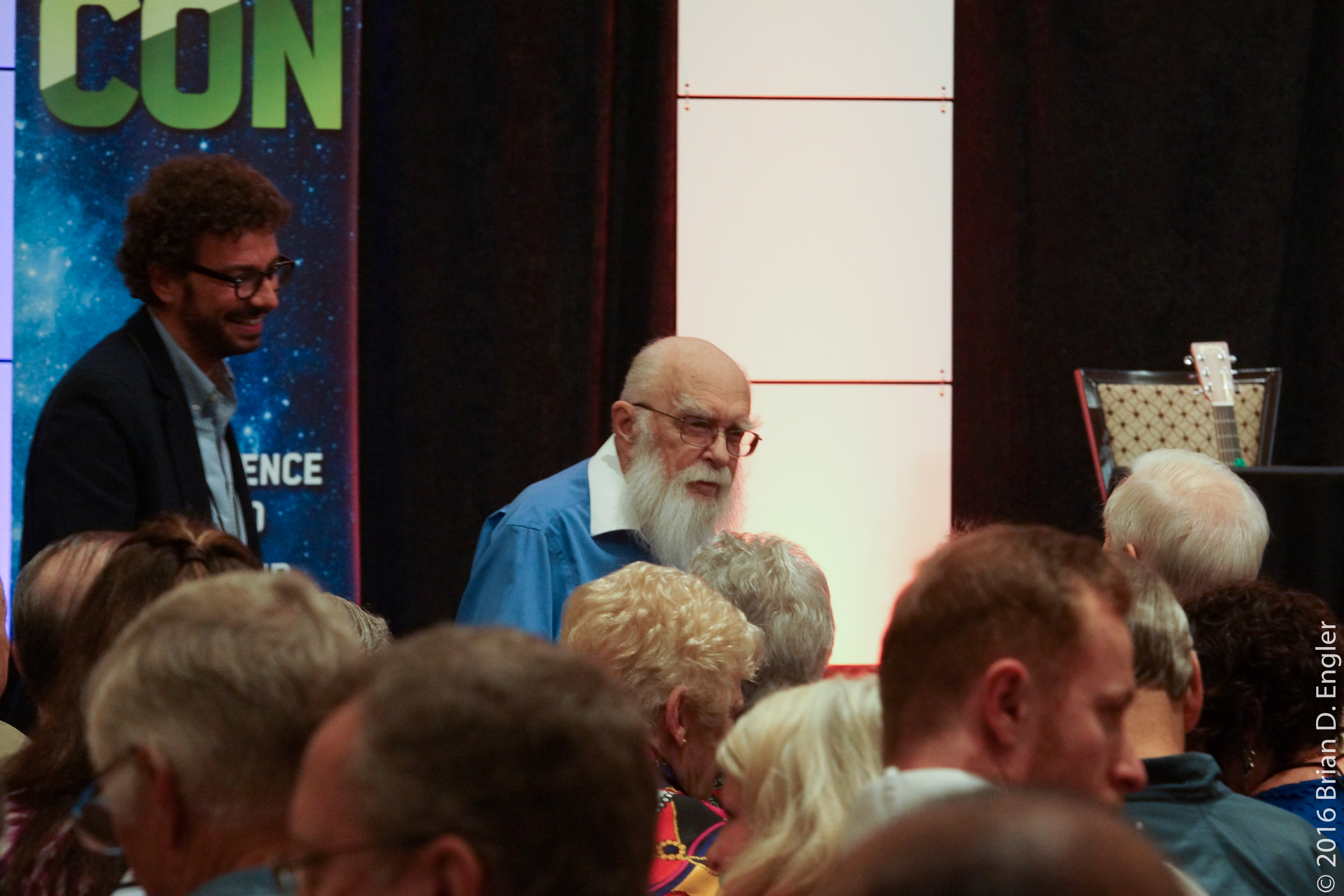
James Randi and Massimo Polidoro 2016

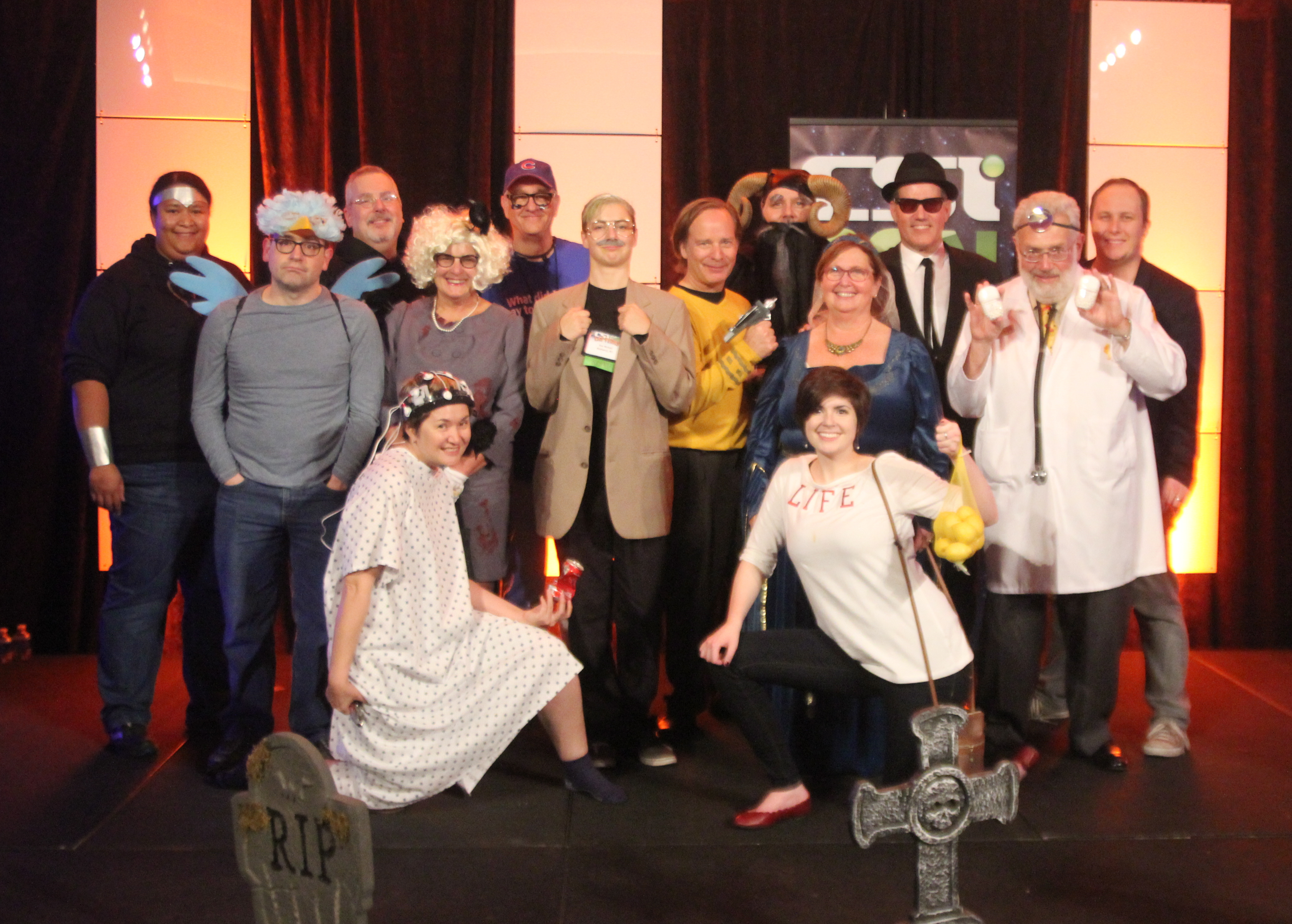
CSI Staff at Halloween Party 2016

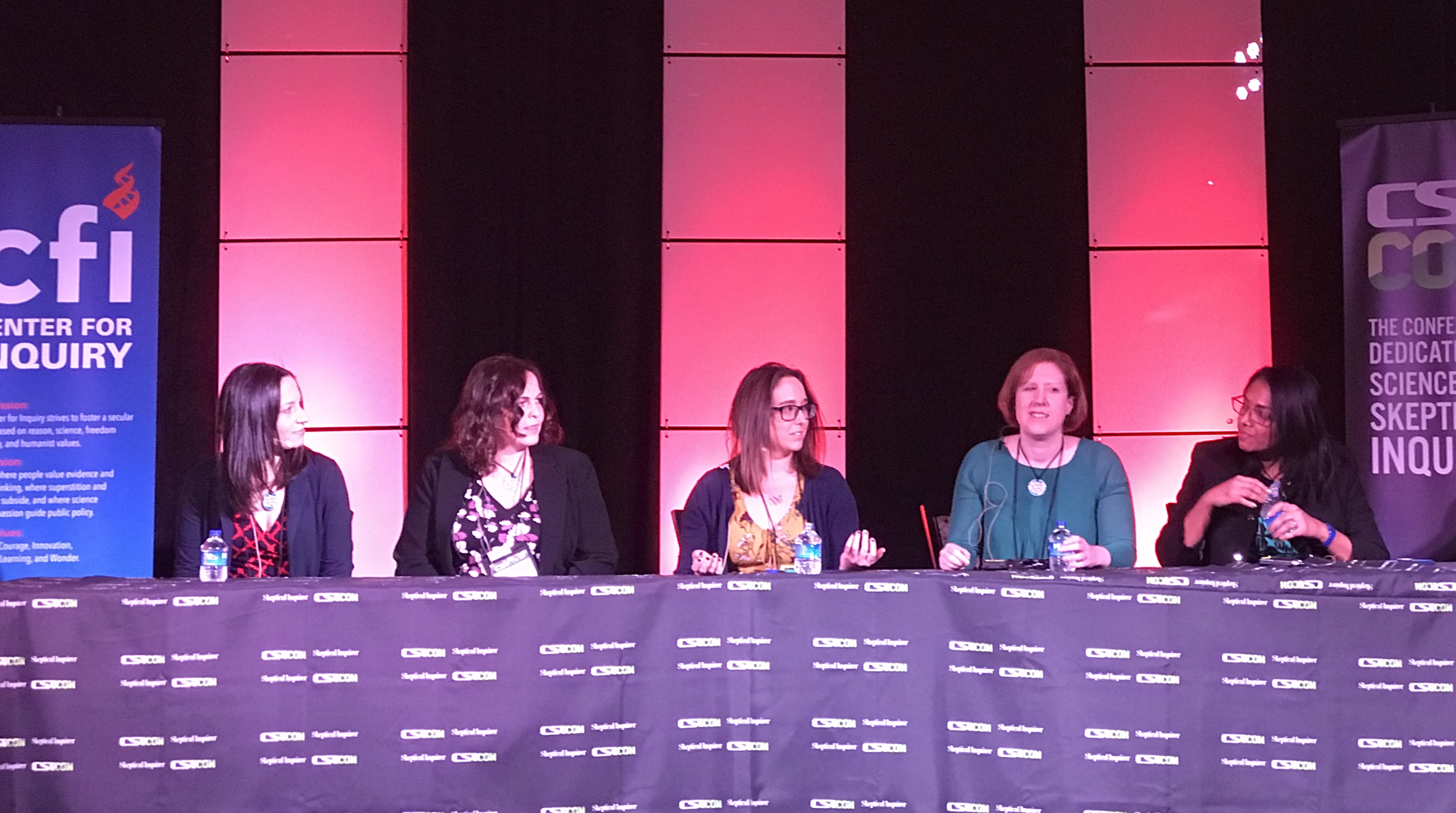
Science Moms panel discussion at CSICon in 2017

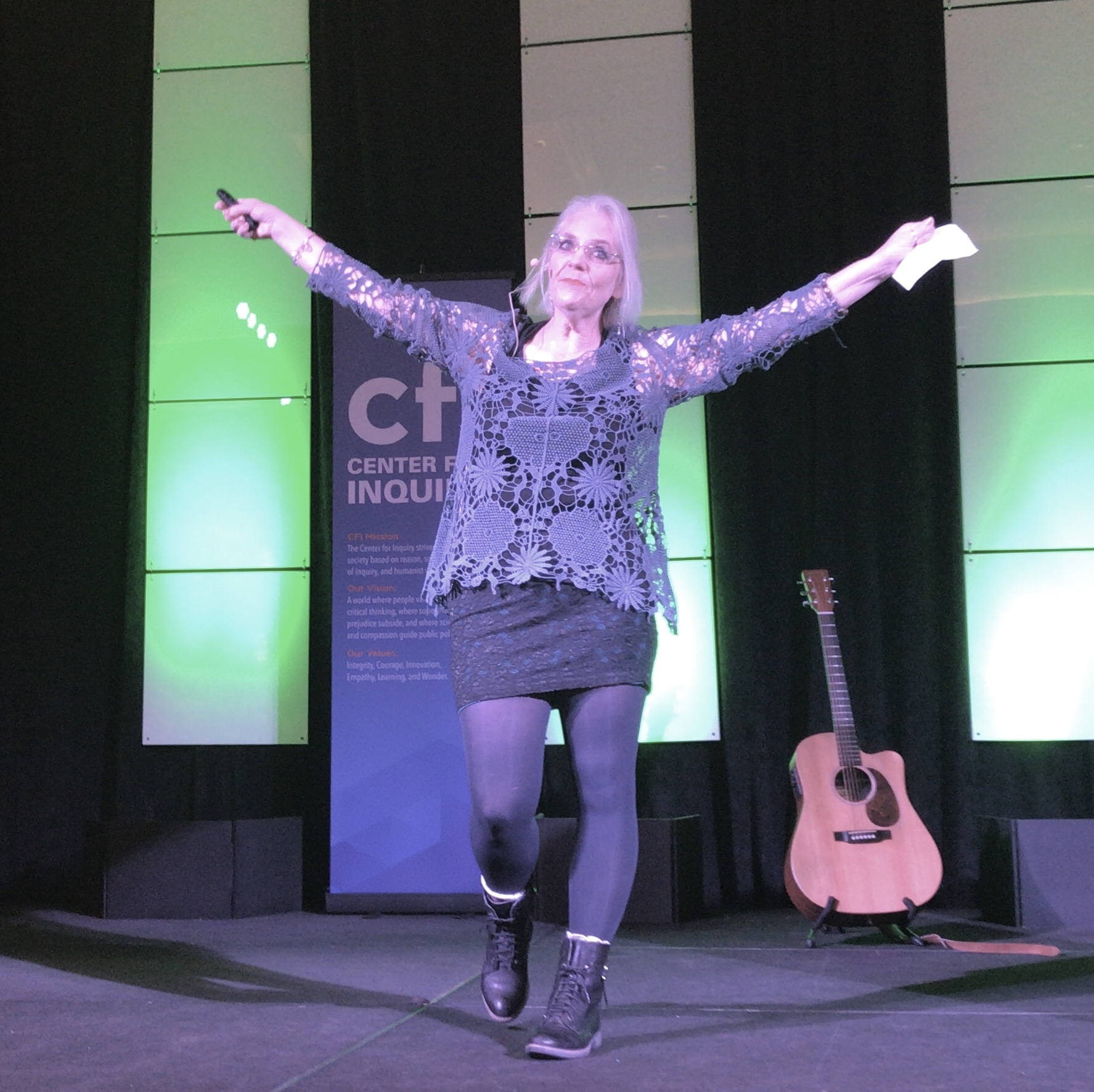
Susan Gerbic presenting on GSoW at CSICon in 2017

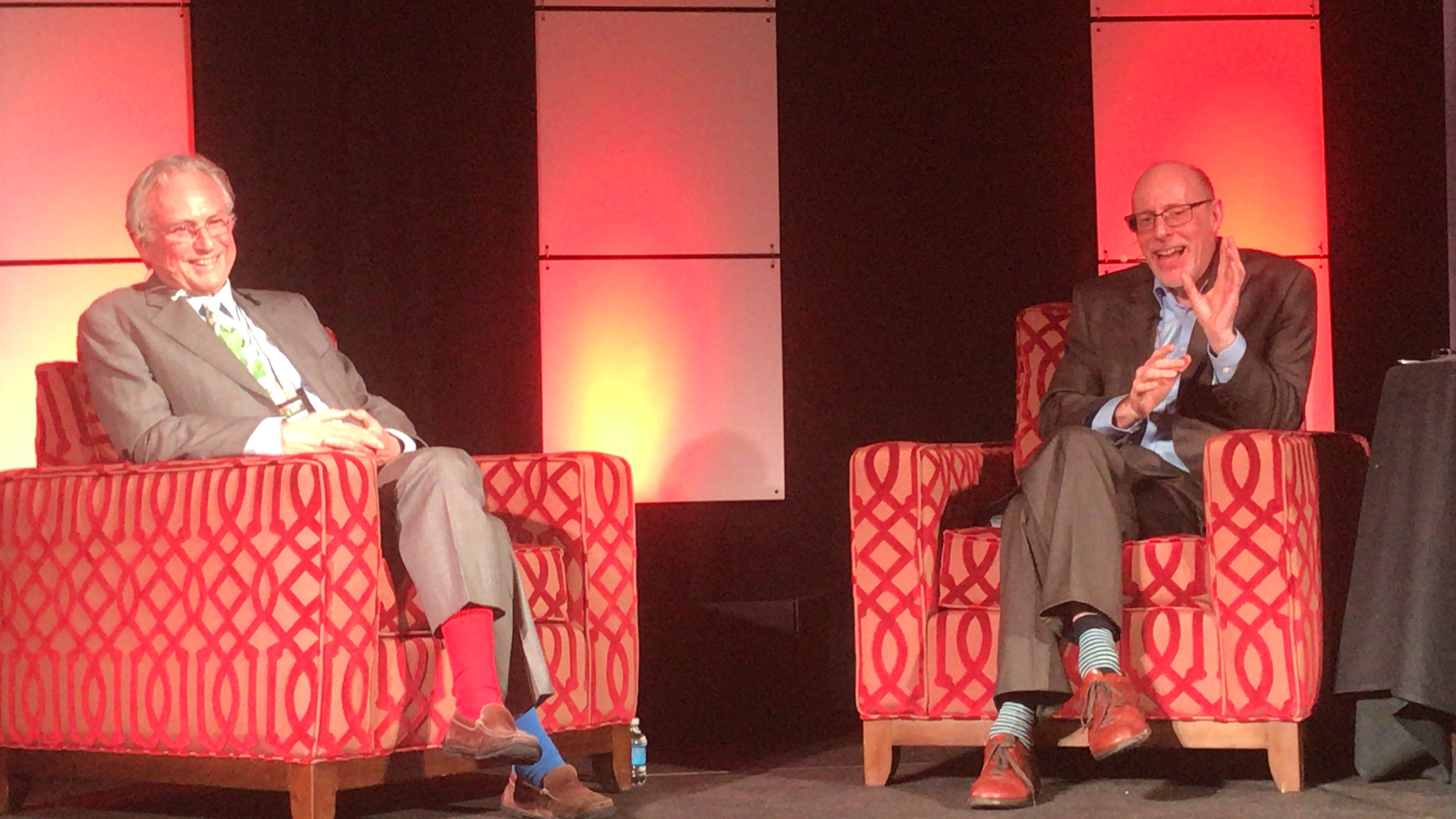
Richard Dawkins and Richard Wiseman at CSICon 2017

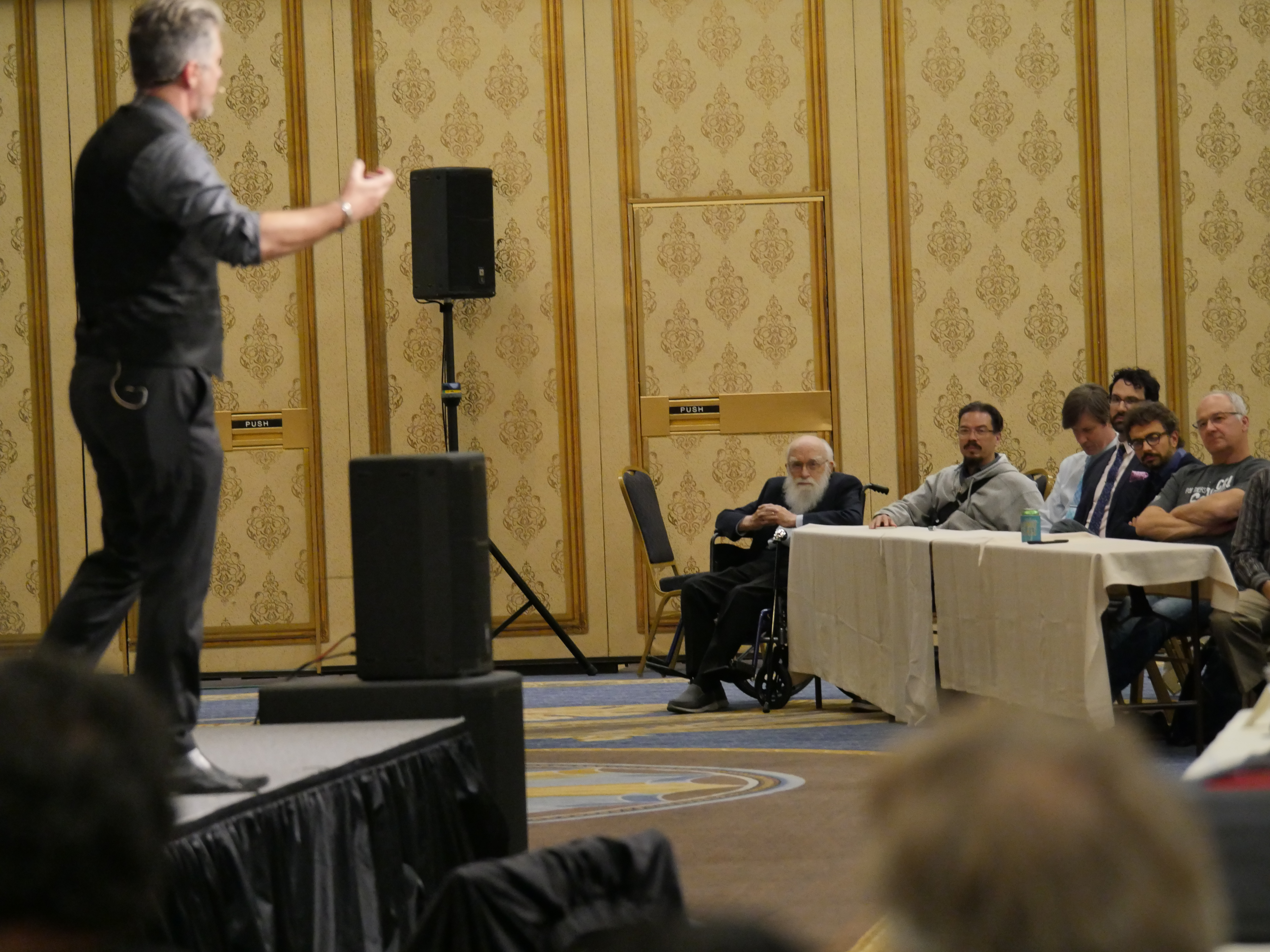
Banachek and his mentor James Randi CSICon 2018

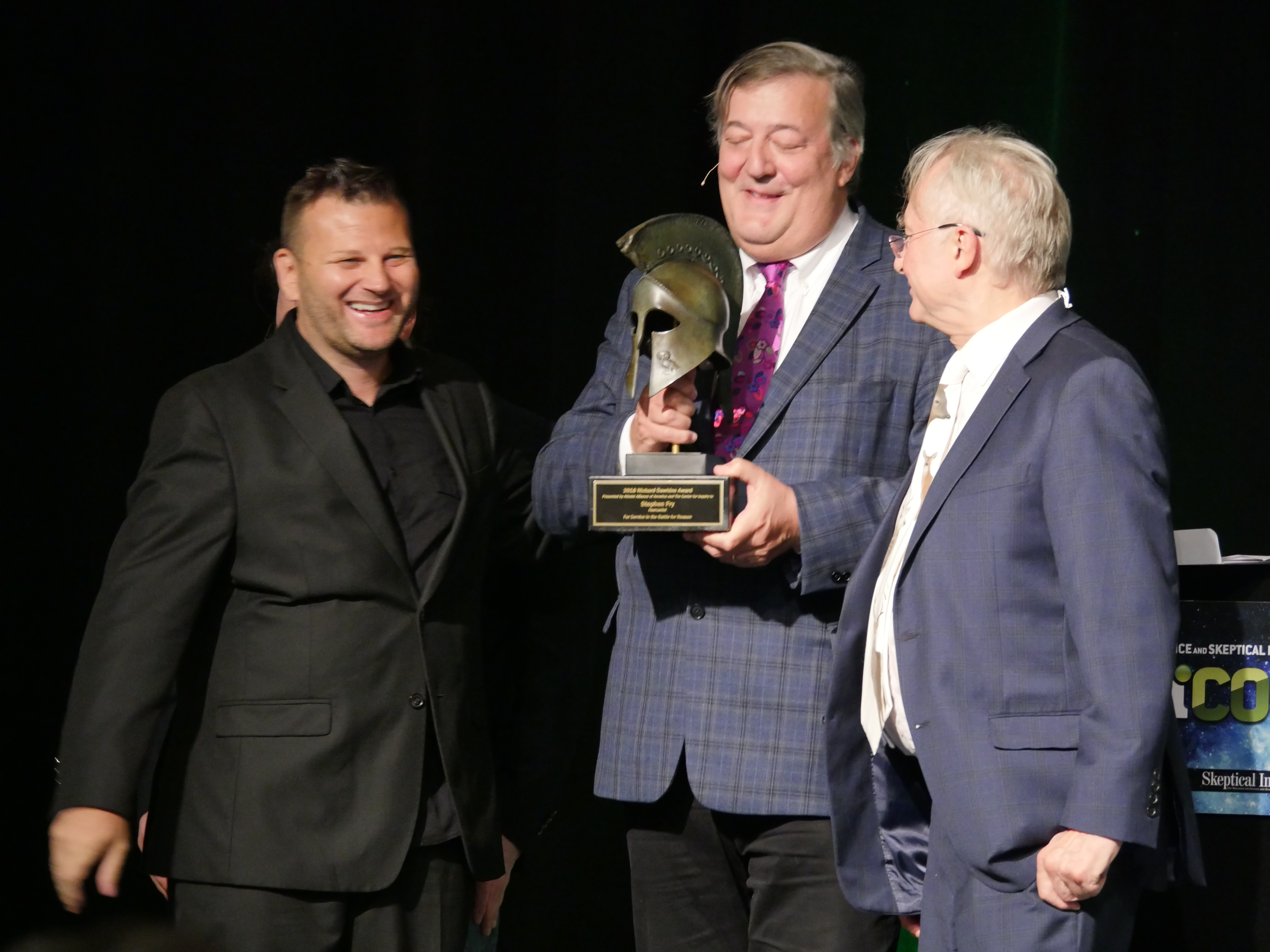
Mark Gura & Richard Dawkins present Stephen Fry the 2018 Atheist Alliance Richard Dawkins Award

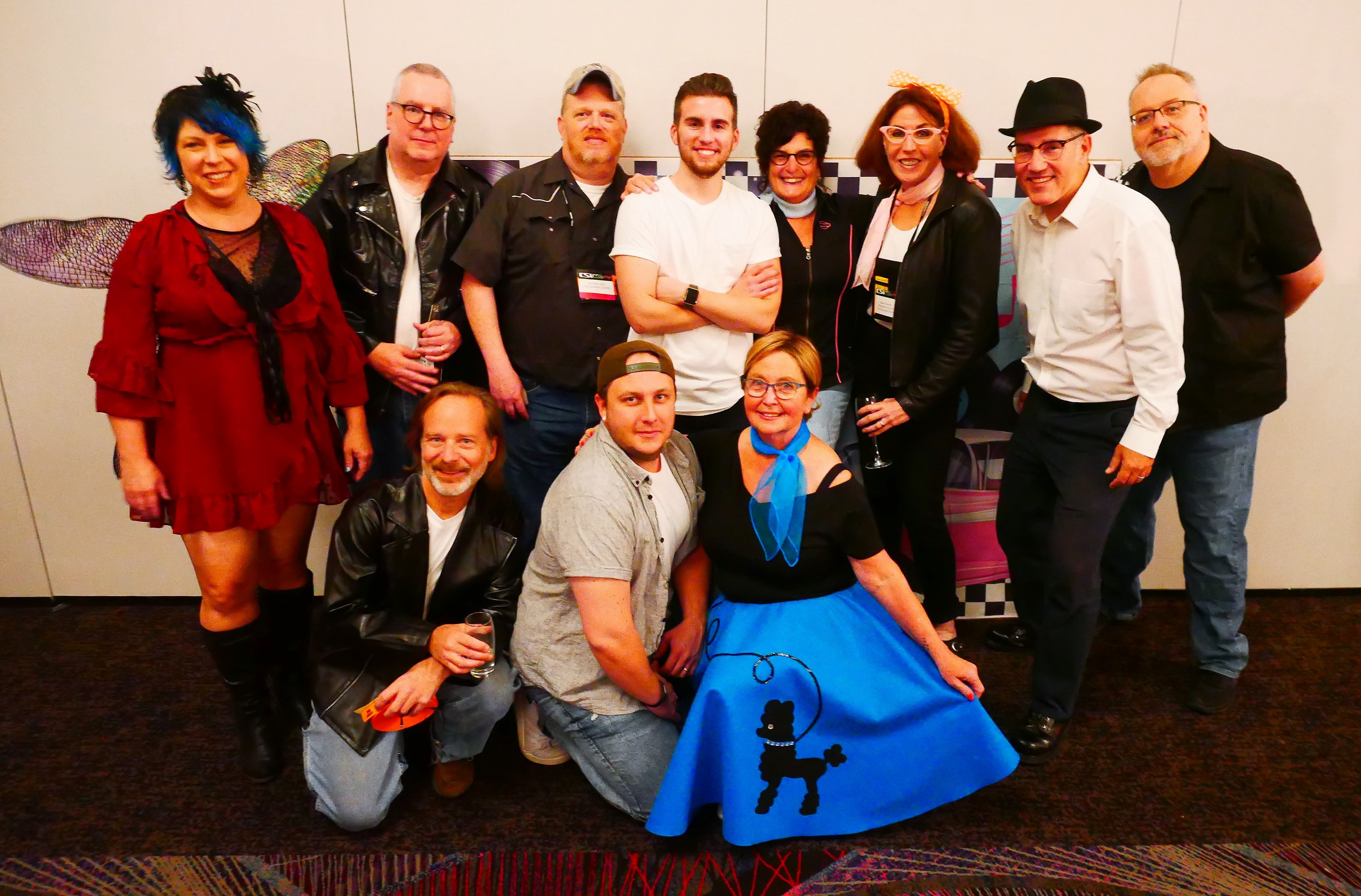
CFI staff at CSICon party 2019

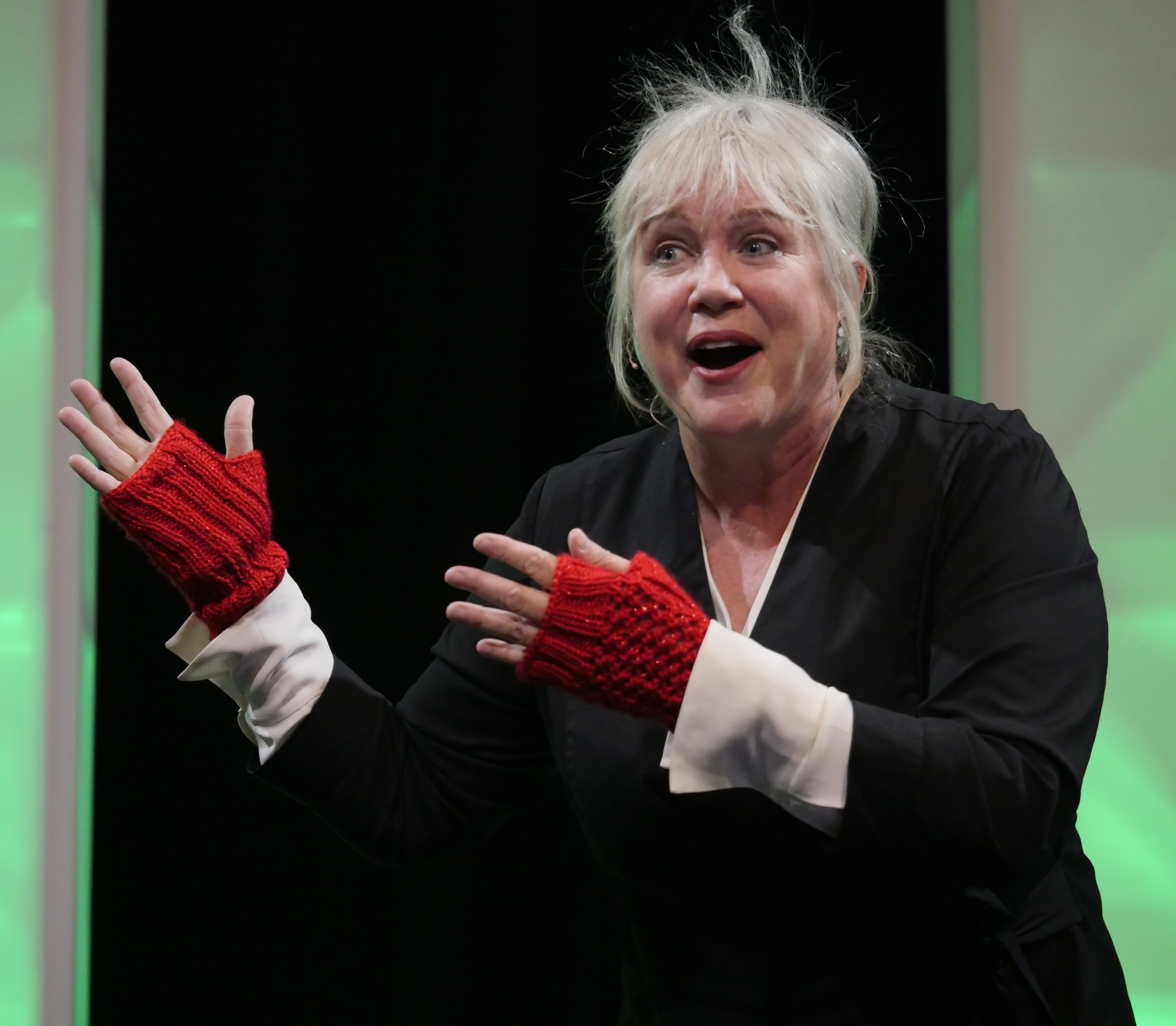
Julia Sweeney "Older and Wider" 2019

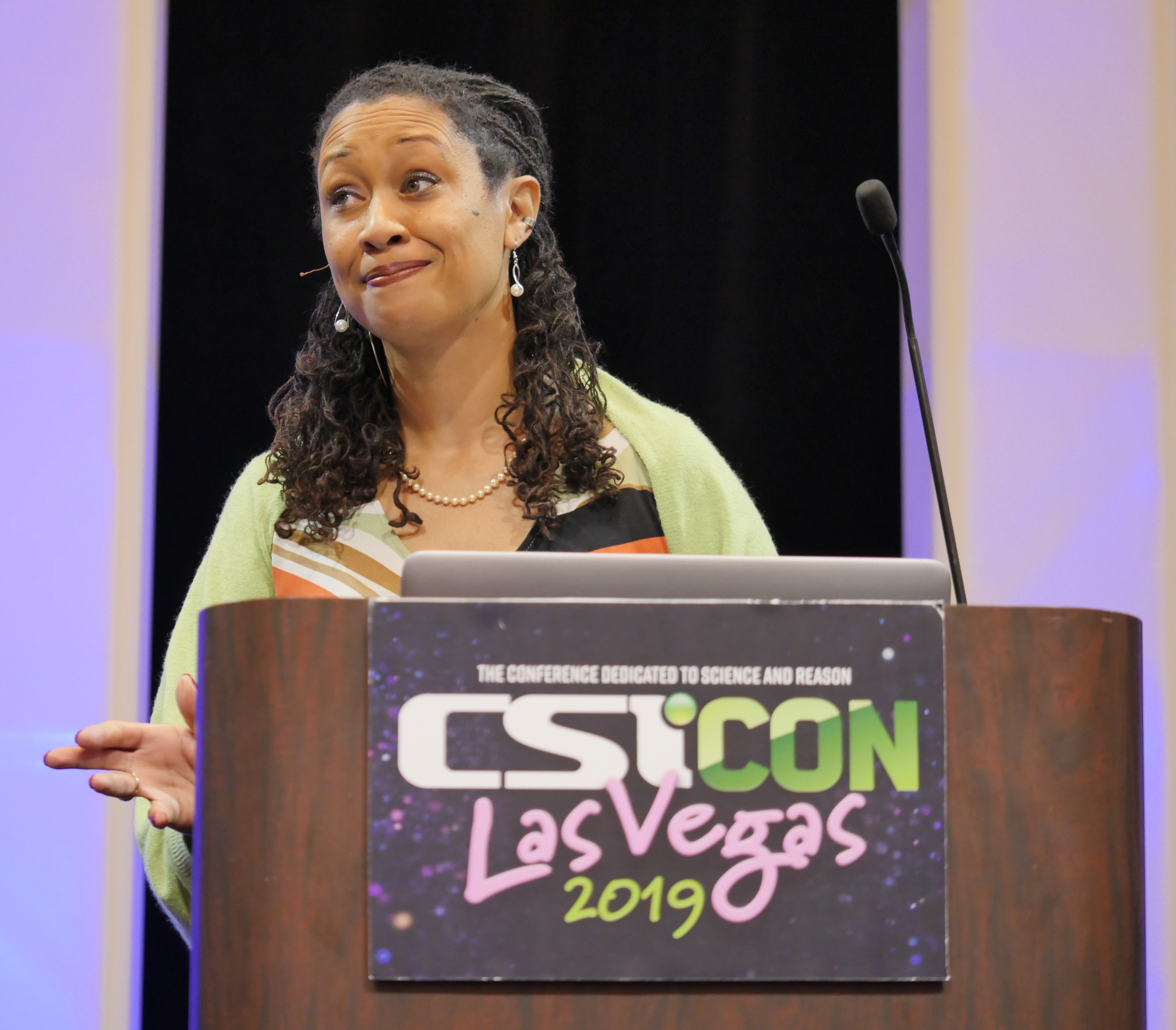
Leighann Lord 2019 CSICon emcee

== See also ==
- Skeptic's Toolbox
- Skepticon
- NECSS
