= Belluz =

Belluz is a surname. Notable people with the surname include:

- Joshua Belluz (born 2001), Canadian soccer player
- Julia Belluz, Canadian journalist
- Luca Del Bel Belluz (born 2003), Canadian ice hockey player
