= Nick Tiller =

British senior research fellow in exercise psychology at Harbor-UCLA

Nicholas B. Tiller
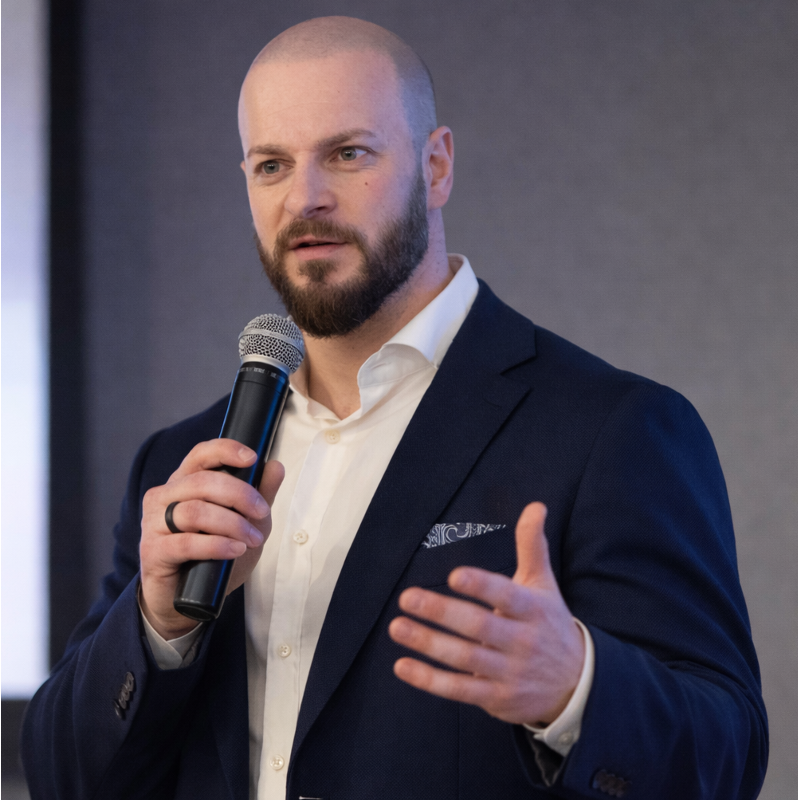
- Nick Tiller presenting at CSICon 2024, Las Vegas, NV.
- Born: London, England
- Education: University of Hertfordshire (BSc, MSc); Brunel University of London (PhD)
- Occupations: Exercise scientist, researcher, author
- Known for: Exercise physiology
- Website: nbtiller.com

Nicholas B. Tiller is a British scientist and author. Tiller's research focuses on pseudoscience in exercise. He is the author of the book The Skeptic’s Guide to Sports Science.

== Early life and education ==
Tiller was born in London, England. He received his undergraduate degree in sport and exercise science and his master's degree in exercise physiology from the University of Hertfordshire. While studying, Tiller worked at the English Institute of Sport, supporting athletes on their Olympic programme, including middle distance runners, rowers, kayakers, sprinters, and badminton players.

Tiller received his PhD from Brunel University of London in applied human physiology, where he studied with Lee Romer.

== Career ==
Tiller is a senior research fellow in exercise physiology at the Lundquist Institute, a non-profit research center based at Harbor–UCLA Medical Center in southern California. Tiller has written articles for publications including Psychology Today, The Washington Post, Ultra-Running Magazine, and the Skeptical Inquirer.

=== On women in sports ===
In a 2020 Washington Post article, the point was made that women are not surpassing men in marathon races (26.2 miles), but they are starting to outperform males in ultramarathons (200+ miles). When asked about this difference, Tiller explained that there may be a variety of reasons behind it. Firstly, rules in marathon running kept women out until about the 1970s so it is only recently that they are starting to participate, but with ultramarathons, women may be "self-selecting" and competing against men who are of "mixed abilities" while the women are "super tough and quick to begin with". Other reasons might be involved as well, because "'From a physiological perspective, females have more slow-twitch muscle fibres than males, which means they are more fatigue resistant at an endurance event'". Over long distances and/or many-hour events, females "tend to burn more fat than men relative to body mass, which counts in the ultra distance." But Tiller points out in a 2023 The Guardian article that science might not "know enough about it at this point". For example, it is possible that females have a higher threshold for physical pain as they give birth. Looking at muscles might be an objective way to understand what can be going on, but "motivation" might be another indicator not incorporated in studies. Tiller advocates for more "balanced analysis of the data". Mental endurance on top of training may be essential, as pushing the limits on the body are "key components" for most ultramarathoners. Self-talk and self-belief, even when in extreme pain and possibly damaging the bodies, kidneys, muscles and cardiovascular system, may enable some people to continue running. According to Tiller, they have "'that relentless kind of inability to give up'".

=== On wellness ===
According to Tiller, the quality of most sports-psychology research (especially various methods touted as enhancing performance) is "terrible". He notes, for example, "The gold standard of evidence is a randomised controlled trial—but how do you blind participants to whether they’re receiving self-talk? What’s the placebo?" The mind, how we think we are doing, is very powerful, which makes it difficult to assess what really works. “'If we accept the premise that 99 percent of products are not supported by evidence, then the $4 trillion worth of sales derive primarily from people convincing themselves that these interventions work,'” he says. “'That’s all psychology.'”

== Scientific scepticism ==
In a 2025 interview with sceptic Steven Novella, Tiller explains that he was introduced to scientific scepticism and critical thinking around 2011 when he was working on getting his PhD. At that time, he had found the podcast The Skeptics' Guide to the Universe and decided to name his book The Skeptic's Guide to Sports Science as a tribute. Tiller's passion was fallacies of sports medicine and he determined that no one was really writing on that topic. After writing two articles for mainstream science outlets he decided that he would try to write a book focusing on "bridge[ing] the gap between critical thinking and exercise science". Tiller says the most common question he receives from people is "what is the secret to being in shape?" and his answer is that it is complicated and not something you can answer quickly. "The secret is that there is no secret. You have to eat well, don't drink, don't smoke and exercise every day. I mean, that's the secret equation." He adds, "do things you enjoy." "Just it doesn't matter what you do, just move. The more you move, the better." Tiller tells Runner's World that humans are looking for quick fixes and are hard-wired this way by evolution, probably to flee predators or find food more quickly. But over time, we still have those urges, but society throws massive amounts of information at us and that confuses and sways people. And when the person offering advice is a sports influencer, "We are ripe for the picking".

In a 2026 interview with Adrienne Hill on The Skeptic Zone Podcast, Tiller describes his introduction to the sceptic community and his experience writing for the Skeptical Inquirer which began in 2021. Tiller's approach is to apply the principles of scientific scepticism to the health and wellness, or fitness industry. Tiller and Hill also discuss pseudoscience and how frequently it appears, for example the use of cupping and chiropractic therapies during the 2024 Summer Olympics.

== Affiliations ==
- Fellow of the Committee for Skeptical Inquiry (CSI) 2023.

== Publications ==
As of January 2026, Scopus lists 43 publications by Tiller.

=== Books ===
- Tiller, Nicholas B. (June 4, 2026). The Health and Wellness Lie: Exposing the hype, hacks and hidden agendas of the wellbeing machine. Bloomsbury Publishing. ISBN 9781399424226
- Tiller, Nicholas (April 17, 2020). The Skeptic's Guide to Sports Science: Confronting Myths of the Health and Fitness Industry. Routledge Press. ISBN 978-1138333130.

=== Selected articles ===
- What's (Not) in Your Supplement? An Energy and Macronutrient Analysis of Commercially Available Carbohydrate Gels, (International Journal of Sport Nutrition and Exercise Metabolism, December 4, 2024), 35(2), pp. 162-170, Tiller NB, Burke LM, Howe SM, Koop J, Ohm JR, Burgess B.
- Decoding Ultramarathon: Muscle Damage as the Main Impediment to Performance, (Sports Medicine October 15, 2024), 55(3), pp. 535-543, Tiller NB, Millet GY.
- Effect of Ultramarathon Trail Running at Sea Level and Altitude on Alveolar-Capillary Function and Lung Diffusion, (Medicine & Science in Sports & Exercise, September 2025), 56(9), pp. 1759-1769. Stewart GM, Fermoyle CC, Wheatley-Guy CM, Robach P, Tiller NB, Taylor BJ, Ziegler B, Schwartz J, Gavet A, Chabridon L, Murdock RW, Constantini K, Johnson BD.
- The Nontechnical Summary: A New Initiative to Enhance the Translation of Sports Science Research and Reduce the Spread of Misinformation, (International Journal of Sport Nutrition and Exercise Metabolism, 2024), 34(6), pp. 337–339, Tiller, N. B., Stellingwerff, T., Witard, O. C., Hawley, J. A., Burke, L. M., & Betts, J. A.
