= Raymond E. Hall =

Raymond Edward Hall
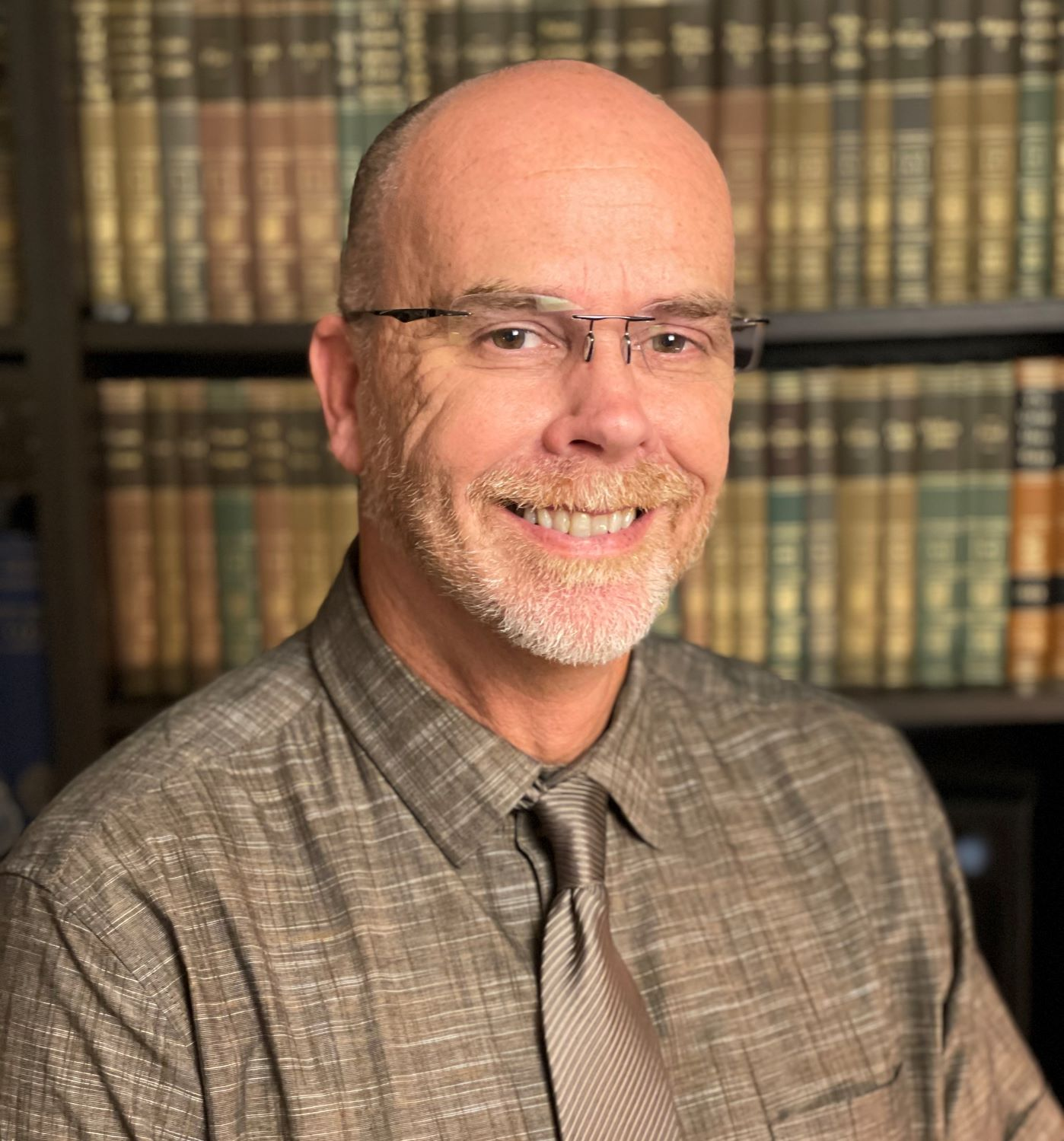
- Ray Hall in 2022
- Born: July 19, 1964 (age 62)
- Education: UC Riverside; Fresno State
- Known for: physicsfun
- Scientific career
- Fields: Particle physics Science Education
- Workplaces: California State University, Fresno
- Doctoral advisor: Stephen J. Wimpenny

Raymond E. Hall (born July 19, 1964, in Los Angeles) is an American physicist serving as a Professor of Physics at California State University, Fresno (Fresno State). Hall's research career has included both experimental physics and science education.

His career in high-energy particle physics spanned over two decades, primarily at Fermi National Laboratory near Chicago. As a key member of the DZero Collaboration there from 1989 to 2010, he made significant contributions to fundamental physics, most notably participating in the groundbreaking discovery of the Top Quark in 1996.

Hall is the creator of the physicsfun Instagram page (Note: 2 million followers) and the associated YouTube channel. (Note: 610,000 subscribers) As of 2025 he has a collection of over 1,700 science toys. Hall’s videos reveal the science behind popular toys, reinforcing his belief that physics is “the real magic of the universe.”

== Academic career ==
Ray Hall received his B.S. (honors) in Physics with minors in Mathematics and Chemistry from California State University, Fresno in 1988. He continued his education at the University of California, Riverside, where he earned his M.S. in Physics in 1990. He got his PhD there in 1994 with the thesis, Search for the Top Quark in Dimuon Events at DØ under Stephen J. Wimpenny. From 1996-1999 he did post-doctoral work at UC Irvine under advisor Andrew J. Lankford.

In 1999 he was hired on the tenure track in the Department of Physics, at California State University, Fresno, and was granted the title of full professor in 2010.

== Critical thinking and skepticism ==
Hall has dedicated a significant portion of his career to promoting critical thinking and scientific skepticism. This interest began when he was an astronomy teaching assistant, and found it necessary to explain to his students the difference between astronomy and astrology. This, in turn, led him to subscribe to Skeptical Inquirer in 1984, marking the beginning of his long-standing engagement with skepticism.

He was elected a fellow of the Committee for Skeptical Inquiry in 2022. In this capacity he conducts workshops and gives lectures to promote critical thinking and share his passion for science and curiosity. He has been a conference organizer for annual meetings of rational skeptics including CSICon (2019-2024) and The Amazing Meeting (2005-2015) in Las Vegas.

Hall's commitment to scientific rationalism is evident in his favorite course to teach, "Science and Nonsense," which focuses on critical thinking and the methods of science.

== Education ==
In science education Hall focuses on understanding best practices for teaching critical thinking and scientific methodologies, as well as assessing student learning outcomes in these areas.

In 2018 (with co-author Kathleen D. Dyer) he published Effect of Critical Thinking Education on Epistemically Unwarranted Beliefs in College Students

He and his wife, Kathleen Dyer were awarded the 2022 JREF award for their "record of encouraging scientific curiosity and critical thought about the natural world, and conducting research into educational strategies for effectively addressing pseudoscientific beliefs.

== Publications ==
- 2019: Effect of Critical Thinking Education on Epistemically Unwarranted Beliefs in College Students (with Kathleen Dyer), Research in Higher Education, vol 60, pp 293–314
- 2011: The D0 Silicon Microstrip Tracker, The DØ Collaboration (S.N. Ahmed et al.) Nucl. Instrum. Meth. A634:8-46
- 2009: Observation of Single Top Quark Production, (Note: Cited: 250+) The DØ Collaboration (V.M. Abazov et al.). Phys. Rev. Lett. 103, 092001
- 2006: The Upgraded D0 detector, (Note: Cited: 900+) The DØ Collaboration (V.M. Abazov et al.) Nucl.Instrum. Meth. A565, 463-537
- 2004: DØ Collaboration. A precision measurement of the mass of the top quark, (Note: Cited: 300+) Nature 429, 638–642
- 1995: Observation of the top quark, (Note: Cited: 2000+) The DØ Collaboration (S. Abachi et al.). Phys. Rev. Lett. 74, 2632-2637
