= Julia Belluz =

Canadian journalist

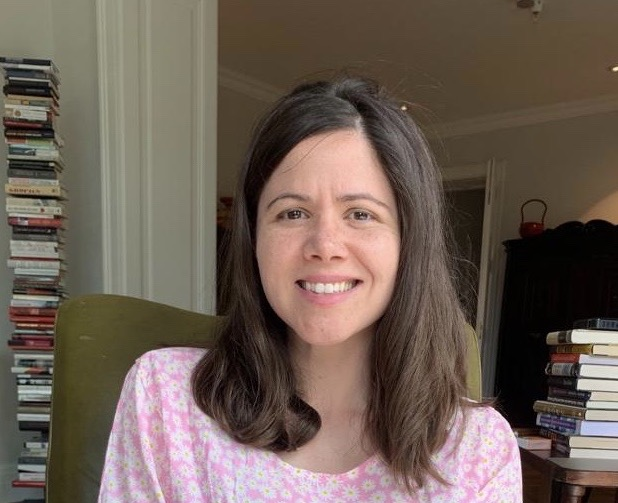
- Education: Ryerson School of Journalism MSc London School of Economics MIT Knight Science Fellow
- Occupation: Journalist
- Years active: 2008–present
- Organization: Vox
- Website: juliabelluz.com

Julia Belluz is a Canadian journalist who specializes in health and science reporting. She was the senior health correspondent for American news website Vox until 2023. Belluz is known for her reporting on various public health issues, including the anti-vaccine movement, the COVID-19 pandemic, and medical pseudoscience. Her Maclean's blog, "Science-ish" and her "Show Me the Evidence" series on Vox both do deep dives into the science behind common health claims. Belluz has also reported on celebrities who give unsubstantiated health advice, such as Dr. Oz, Gwyneth Paltrow, and Alex Jones.

== Education ==
Julia Belluz graduated from the Ryerson School of Journalism in 2007. She went on to earn an M.Sc. from the London School of Economics, followed by an internship for the Times of London. In 2013–2014, she was a Knight Science Journalism Fellow at the Massachusetts Institute of Technology, a program designed to allow science journalists to study alongside scientists. Belluz's study focused on the relationship between science and policy. Of the program, Belluz said, "It’s important to not only understand the science you’re reporting on, but also the culture of science."

== Career ==
In 2009, after a year of working at newspapers and magazines in London, Belluz moved back to Canada for an entry-level reporter job at Maclean's. During her time at Maclean's, Belluz created the blog Science-ish "in response to bewildering and contradictory claims ... that float around in the popular discourse." The blog evaluated scientific claims related to health and nutrition.

Belluz went on to work at Vox, where she became senior health correspondent. At Vox, she has written about significant health topics, such as measles outbreaks in anti-vaccination communities, maternal mortality in the United States, the Ebola and COVID-19 pandemics, the fallacy of exercise for weight loss, and other nutritional claims. Belluz has also been known for examining questionable health claims from celebrities such as Dr. Oz, Gwyneth Paltrow, and Alex Jones. Her "Show Me the Evidence" series on Vox takes a deep dive into the science behind health claims surrounding nutrition, medicine, exercise, and more. In Belluz's words, "by emphasizing magic pills and miracle treatments, we also lose focus on the more mundane things that actually matter to health – like education, equality, and the environment." She left Vox in 2023 to write Food Intelligence, a book about nutrition, with Kevin Hall.

Additionally, Belluz's work has been published in BMJ, the Chicago Tribune, the Economist and Economist's Intelligent Life magazine, the Globe and Mail, the LA Times, the National Post, ProPublica, Slate, and the Times of London. She has also spoken at various universities and conferences about health journalism and contributed a chapter titled "The New Health Journalism" in the book To Save Humanity: What Matters Most for a Healthy Future."

== Works ==
- Belluz, Julia and Kevin Hall.Food Intelligence: The Science of How Food Both Nourishes and Harms Us. Avery, 2025. ISBN 978-0-593-33230-6

== Awards ==
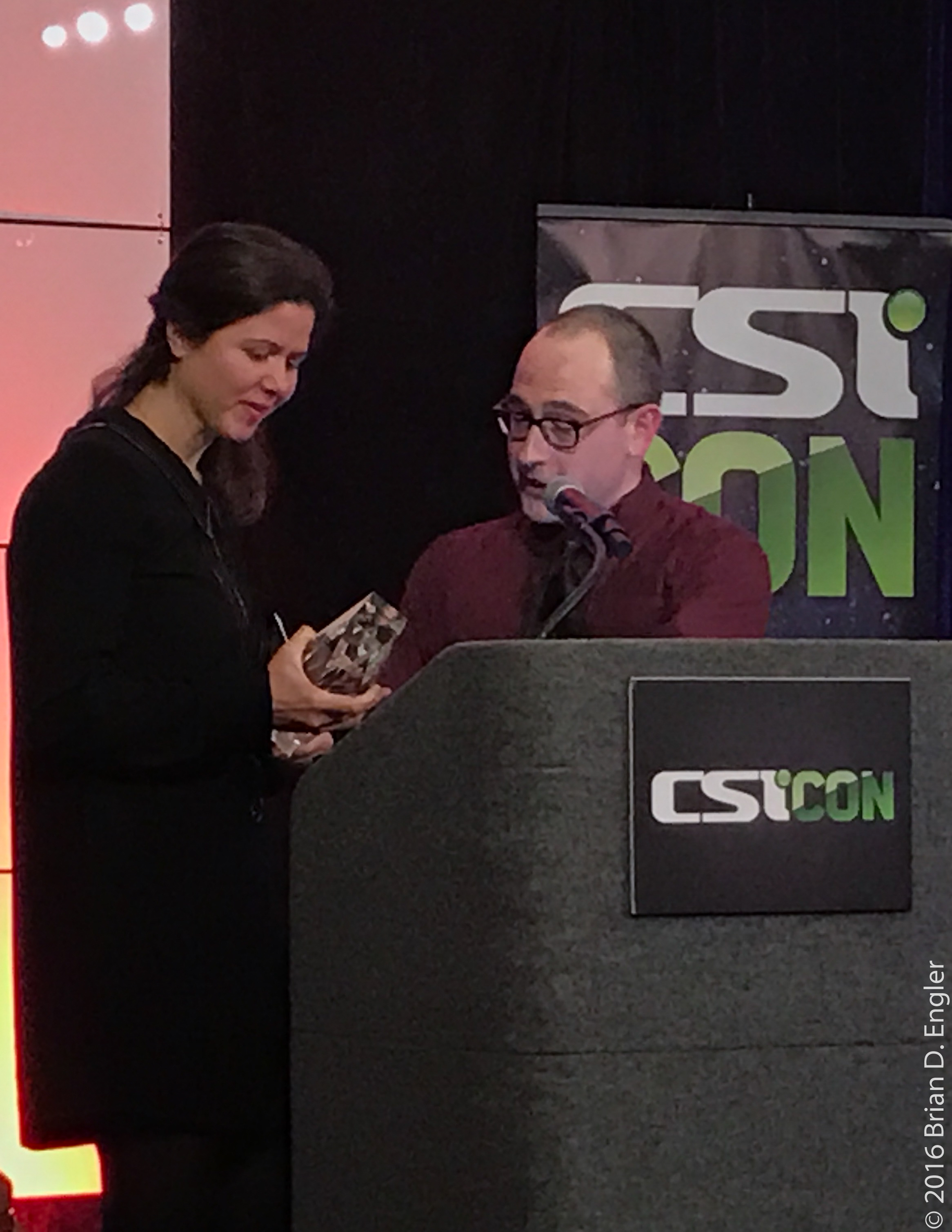
Julia Belluz receives 2016 Balles Award at CSICon

Julia Belluz has won various awards, including:

- 2007: Belluz received Canada's National Magazine Award for Best Student Writer for her profile of journalist Ian Brown.
- 2013: Canada's National Magazine Awards gave Belluz the Gold award for Best Blog for her blog "Science-ish."
- 2016: The Committee for Skeptical Inquiry awarded Belluz the Balles Prize in Critical Thinking for "deftly debunking unscientific and outrageous medical claims, and for taking on the gurus of pseudoscience and quackery." Executive director of the Committee for Skeptical Inquiry Barry Karr said "Julia Belluz beats them at their own game. In her outstanding work at Vox, she combines the tools of digital storytelling with a unique, passionate voice and good old-fashioned fact-based reporting (imagine that!), dispelling myths and sparking genuine critical thinking in the minds of her many readers ... The public needs allies when faced with a deluge of unscientific, dangerous, and costly claims about health and medicine. She’s among the strongest allies they have, and that’s why we’re proud to be giving her this award."
- 2017: The American Society for Nutrition gave Belluz the award for Nutrition Science Media.
- 2019: Belluz was a finalist for the 2019 National Academies of Sciences, Engineering, and Medicine Communications Award for online content. Belluz, and her colleagues, Eliza Barclay, Brigid McCarthy, and Gina Barton, were nominated for their Vox article, "The Mysteries of Weight Loss."
