= Coral Academy of Science =

Charter school in Nevada, United States

Coordinates: 39.537973°N 119.796574°W

Location
- Reno, Nevada; United States

Information
- Type: Charter school
- Grades: 1-12
- Accreditation: Cognia
- Website: coralacademy.org

Coral Academy of Science is a charter school that serves grades 1–12. The elementary school is located on Valley Road, while the middle school is located on 1350 East 9th Street, and the High School on Neil Road, all in Reno, Nevada. Coral Academy of Science has many sister locations in Henderson, Nevada. The school is fully accredited by the Northwest Accreditation Commission (NWAC), formerly NAAS (Northwest Association of Accredited Schools) and now a division of Cognia.
