= Kenny Biddle =

Investigator of paranormal claims

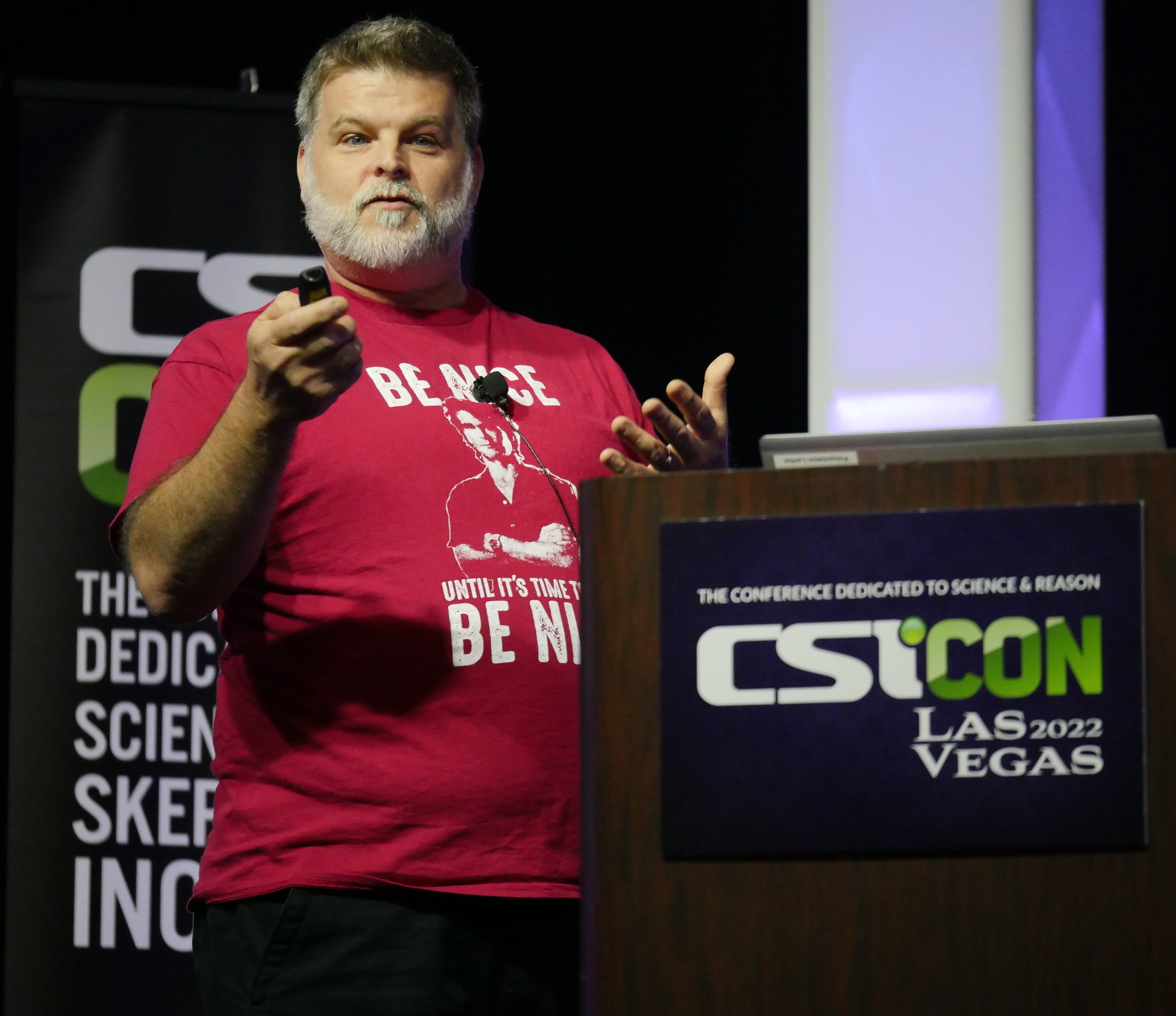
- Kenny Biddle presenting at CSICon in 2022.
- Occupation: Investigator of paranormal claims
- Website: Facebook blog

Kenny Biddle is an investigator of paranormal claims. He is chief investigator at the Committee for Skeptical Inquiry and a fellow of the same organization.

Initially interested in ghost hunting, UFOs and other fringe pursuits, Biddle gradually adopted a scientifically minded approach to the study of a wide range of paranormal phenomena.

== Ghost hunter ==
Biddle grew up in a Catholic household where spirituality was a given. He developed a keen interest in paranormal mysteries watching television programs such as In Search of.... He made his first on-site investigation in 1997 and joined forces with other ghost-hunters inspired by television. He founded a group called Paranormal Investigative Research Association in Pennsylvania. An experienced photographer, he collaborated with the Mutual UFO Network.

Biddle started to question his approach to investigations into paranormal phenomena when he attended a 1999 ghost hunting convention in Pennsylvania, where a group was claiming to have encountered a hostile entity the night before at the Gettysburg Civil War battlefield. From the description of the event, it became clear that Biddle himself was the ghost they were talking about. He had come out of the woods in the dark to chase a group that was disrupting a filming he was involved in; it became apparent they could not see him clearly and concluded he was a paranormal entity. That his fellow ghost hunters were not receptive to his version of the tale made him reevaluate his own attitudes.

== Scientific approach to the paranormal ==
Biddle started to follow in the steps of science-based investigators, such as chief investigator for the Committee for Skeptical Inquiry Joe Nickell. His expertise in photography and how optical phenomena generate peculiar images on film attracted the attention of Benjamin Radford, who asked him to write for the Center of Inquiry's newsletter. He continued to be involved with the organization and eventually took over Nickell's position when he retired in 2022.

Biddle has been quoted as an expert on the scientific study of paranormal phenomena in publications such as Newsweek, Live Science, the New York Times Magazine, Popular Mechanics, People Magazine and The Atlantic. His investigations and observations have been mentioned in a number of books on supernatural phenomena.

He hosts the weekly podcast Skeptical Help Bar and writes a regular column for Skeptical Inquirer. With Sharon Hill, Biddle established the Anomalies Research Society, a network of professionals investigating claims of paranormal and anomalous events.

Biddle conducts on-site investigations, trying to determine the cause of phenomena reported as having paranormal causes. He developed an expertise in the more technical aspects of the work, such as photography and video editing, as well as the various hardware used to detect entities. He tends to be critical of the misuse of devices such as EMF meters by ghost hunters who do not understand the way they work, leading to false positives. He stated in 2015 that beyond the use of new gadgetry, ghost hunters still essentially use the same methods than they used a century ago. He continues to attend events of the ghost-hunting community, speaking about his experiences and discussing the proper use of technology in the field.

In 2017, he helped a group led by Susan Gerbic expose the cold reading techniques of psychic Matt Fraser.

Biddle believes he never faced a situation where an actual ghost is the most probable explanation. "My goal is to gather enough information that will lead to a solid and honest conclusion that sufficiently explains a mystery," Biddle told Newsweek in 2021.

With David Schumacher and Tim Vickers, he compiled a series of observations on what kind of electromagnetic measurements one can expect to get in a house (one that is presumably not haunted), to serve as control in paranormal investigations. The report was published in 2023 in the Journal of Scientific Exploration.
