= International Journal of Sport Nutrition and Exercise Metabolism =

- Discipline: Sports medicine
- Language: English
- Edited by: James A. Betts

Publication details
- Former name: International Journal of Sport Nutrition
- History: 1991–present
- Publisher: Human Kinetics Publishers (United States)
- Frequency: Bimonthly
- Impact factor: 4.619 (2021)

Standard abbreviations
- ISO 4: Int. J. Sport Nutr. Exerc. Metab.

Indexing
- CODEN: IJSNAA
- ISSN: 1526-484X (print); 1543-2742 (web)
- LCCN: sn99009201
- OCLC no.: 42276329

Links
- Journal homepage

The International Journal of Sport Nutrition and Exercise Metabolism is a scientific journal addressing topics in nutrition, exercise metabolism, and related fields.

== Abstracting and indexing ==
The journal is abstracted and indexed in Web of Science, AGRICOLA, BIOBASE, Chemical Abstracts, Current Awareness in Biological Sciences, Current Contents, EBSCOhost, EMBASE, Scopus, Excerpta Medica, MEDLINE, and the Science Citation Index.
