= Good Thinking Society =

Organization

The Good Thinking Society
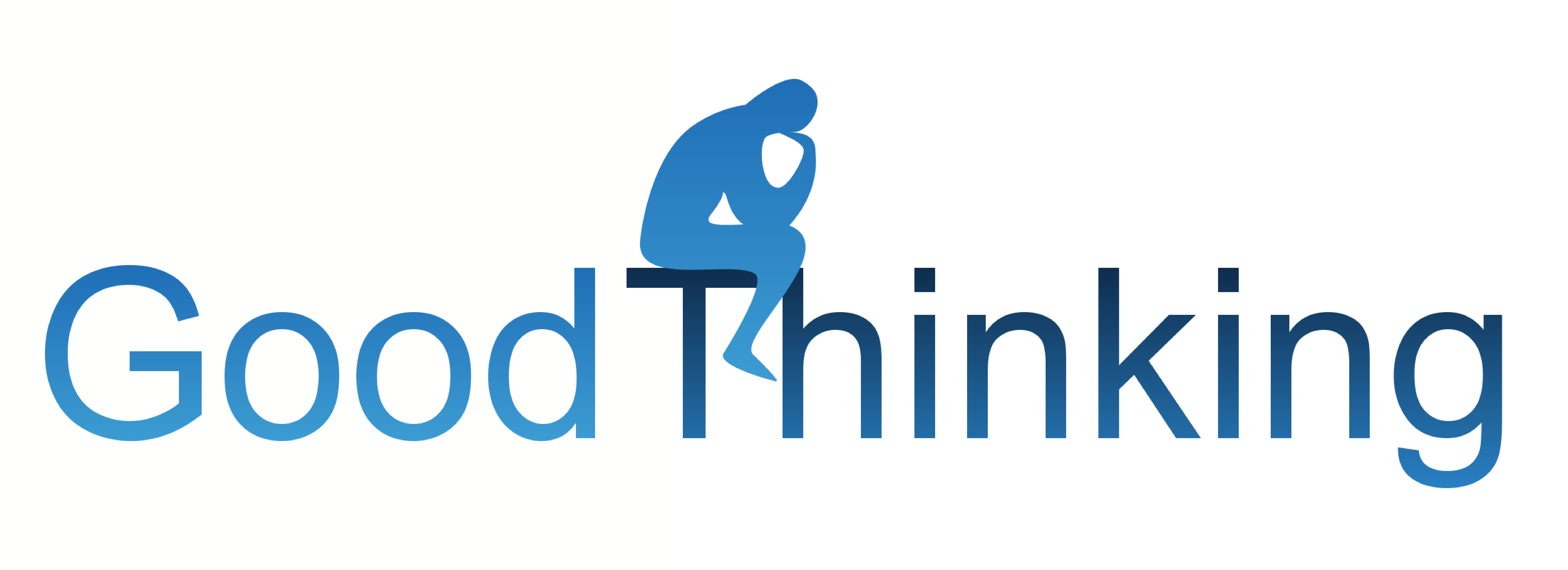
- Abbreviation: GTS
- Formation: September 2012
- Founder: Simon Singh
- Type: Nonprofit organisation
- Legal status: Registered charity
- Purpose: To encourage curious minds and promote rational enquiry
- Region served: England and Wales
- Chairman: Simon Singh
- Board of directors: Johnnie Shannon, Michael Marshall, Laura Thomason
- Website: goodthinkingsociety.org

The Good Thinking Society is a nonprofit organisation promoting scientific scepticism established by Simon Singh in September 2012.

== Activities ==
The society aims to raise awareness of and fund sceptical projects.

During the 2014 World Homeopathy Awareness Week, the Good Thinking Society set up a website at homeopathyawarenessweek.org with the purpose of giving a factual scientific view on homeopathy. They also ran Psychic Awareness Month in October 2014, during which they handed out leaflets to audience members before a psychic's shows in the UK. In April 2015 the organisation threatened legal action against the Liverpudlian Clinical Commissioning Group over its spending of £30,000 per year on homeopathy, with Singh saying "Homeopathic treatments when paid for by the NHS are a waste of crucial resources". Thereafter, Singh and project director Michael Marshall called on all remaining homeopathy-funding CCGs in the UK to follow the example of Liverpool to reconsider their funding policies.

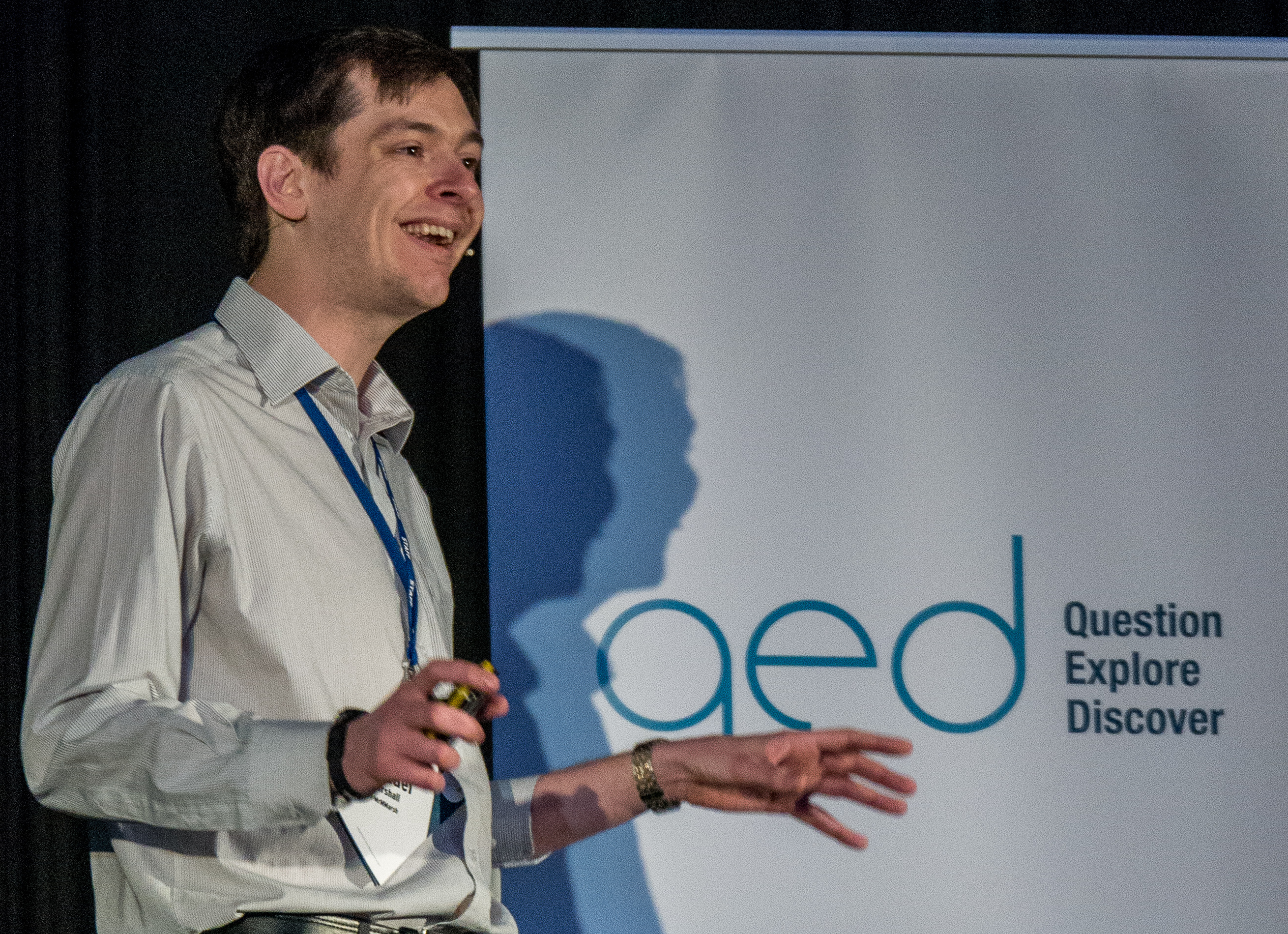
Michael Marshall lecturing on GTS' homeopathy campaign at QED 2015.

In June 2015, the Daily Mirror reported that Marshall had investigated the curious case of Freeman's, a NHS-supplying pharmacy that, amongst other products, sold "homeopathic owl", apparently meant for people with sleeping problems or who "pick up the characteristics of [an owl]". Marshall commented that "Around £3-5 million is spent each year [on homeopathic products by the NHS] and it's completely worthless. People are being told that it works when there's no evidence that it does."

In May 2015, GTS obtained video footage from the Spirit of Health Congress, where, according to Marshall, claims were made about health that 'appeared illegal and could cause serious harm': "The dangerous misinformation at the Spirit of Health event is shocking, particularly with regard to serious conditions such as cancer."

In September 2015, Marshall showed how American televangelist and self-proclaimed prophet and faith healer Peter Popoff – previously exposed by James Randi – was trying to persuade people to send him money on promises of "fabulous extreme fortune" and "miracles". Moreover, at a recent London gathering, GTS filmed how Popoff supposedly 'healed' a woman 'who said her body was wracked with pain', but who Marshall and his colleague believed could have been planted in the audience as part of Popoff's team: they saw she was handing out pens and a questionnaire at the start of the event, and quietly left the room soon after the alleged miracle.

In November 2015, following a threat of legal action by the Good Thinking Society, the British government stated that the Department of Health would hold a consultation in 2016 regarding whether homeopathic treatments should be added to the NHS treatments blacklist (officially, Schedule 1 of the National Health Service (General Medical Services Contracts) (Prescription of Drugs etc.) Regulations 2004), that specifies a blacklist of medicines not to be prescribed under the NHS.

In November 2017, the British Homeopathic Association (BHA) filed suit to overturn NHS England's 2017 guidance which advises GP's not to prescribe homeopathic remedies. In June, 2018, BHA lost that case, in a decision characterized by Edzard Ernst as the result of "4 years of excellent work by the GOOD THINKING SOCIETY".

In June 2019, the Good Thinking Society filed a Judicial Review claim to challenge an earlier decision by the Professional Standards Authority to re-accredit the Society of Homeopaths' register. At the time of filing several (GTS alleges it to be over 50) Society of Homeopaths members were still offering CEASE therapy for autism. In October 2019 the High Court gave permission for the judicial review to proceed.

The Good Thinking Society also promotes mathematics education, through projects like "Who wants to be a mathematician?", "Top, top set maths", and the "Parallel Project".

In March 2020 the Good Thinking Society announced their collaboration with Richard Wiseman to set up The Good Magic Awards. These awards recognize and reward performers that use magic tricks to improve the lives of people like disadvantaged groups, charities, community groups, hospital patients and others struggling with physical and psychological challenges. These awards were announced on March 17, 2020, and were awarded the first time on May 5, 2020.

== Awards ==
The society runs a number of awards including the Golden Duck award, given for a 'lifetime achievement of quackery', awarded to Andrew Wakefield in 2012. The society also awarded a joint Science Blog Prize to Suzi Gage and David Colquhoun in 2012; Ben Goldacre and science writer Mark Henderson were among the judges, choosing from over 100 entries.

The society was given the 2016 Ockham Award for Best Skeptic Event/Campaign by The Skeptic magazine.

== See also ==
- Lists about skepticism
- Merseyside Skeptics Society
- Committee for Skeptical Inquiry
- Quackwatch
