= Deborah Hyde =

British sceptic, folklorist, cultural anthropologist, and Ufologist

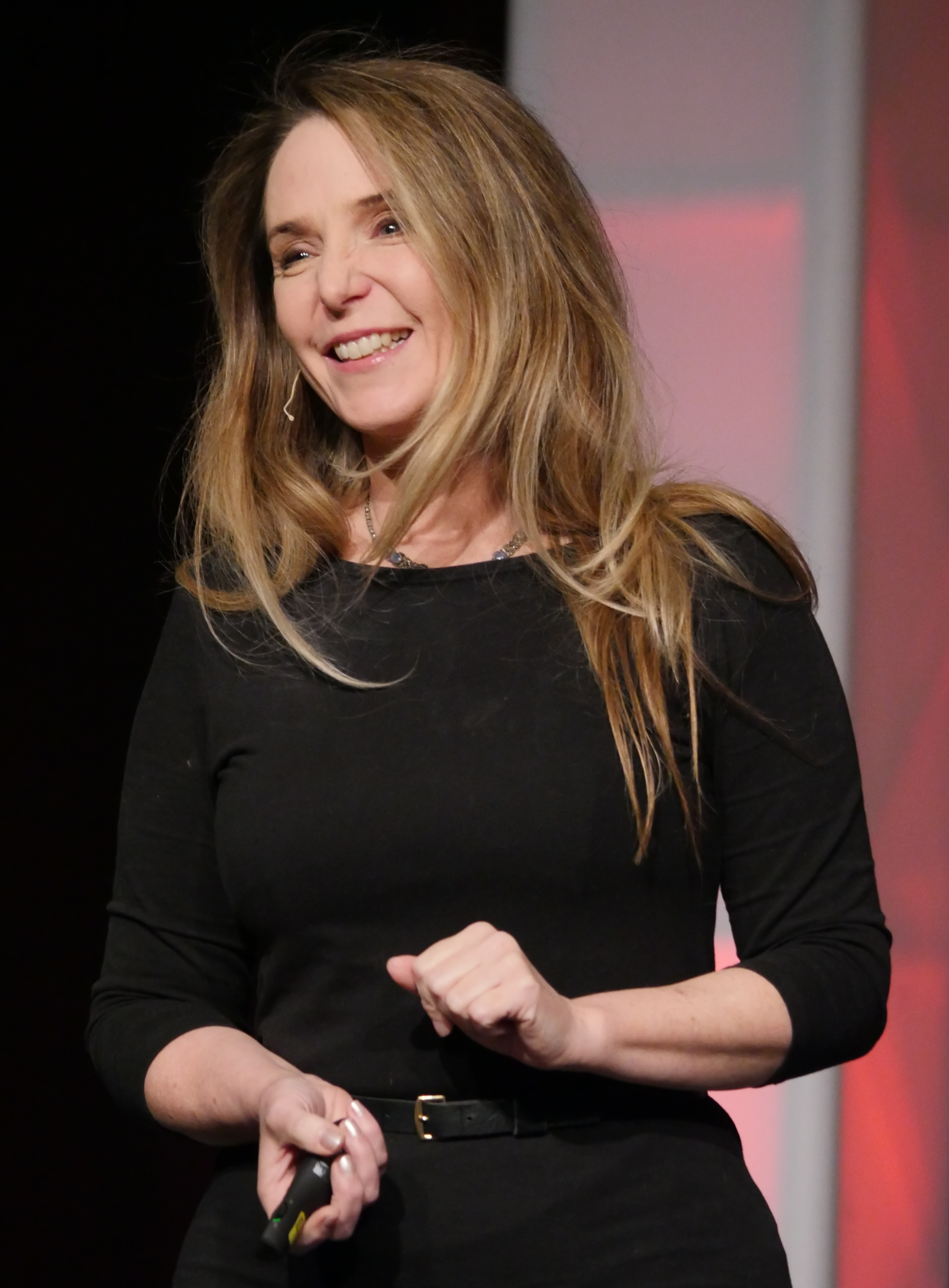
- Deborah Hyde presenting at CSICon 2018
- Born: 1965 (age 60–61); London, England
- Occupations: Film-industry makeup effects coordinator Managing editor of The Skeptic
- Deborah Hyde, recorded Sept. 2015
- Website: deborahhyde.com

Deborah Hyde (/haɪd/; born 1965) is a British sceptic, folklorist, cultural anthropologist, Ufologist, fellow of the Committee for Skeptical Inquiry, and editor-in-chief of The Skeptic. She writes and lectures extensively about superstition, cryptozoology, religion and belief in the paranormal, with special regard to the folklore, psychology and sociology behind these phenomena, and has been introduced as a "vampire expert". Hyde has also worked in the motion picture industry. She is a patron of Humanists UK.

== Early life ==
Hyde's interest in the supernatural stems from her childhood and she attributes it to "having spent too much time with mad aunties". While other girls are usually interested in fairies and angels, she has always been fascinated by "dark stuff". She started out believing, but that changed with her discovering The Black Arts by occult writer Richard Cavendish, which made her apply a more analytic approach to these phenomena.

== Career outside of scepticism ==
For years Hyde was in the business of distributing collectibles, during which time she spent a few years in New York City. That period was followed in the 1990s by her activities as a coordinator and production manager in various departments, including creature and makeup effects, as well as set construction.

=== Contributions to the film industry ===
Hyde has contributed to several motion pictures as a staff member and coordinator in the makeup department, responsible for prosthetics and creature effects, including for the horror films Doghouse and 1408. She was creature effects coordinator for the drama On a Clear Day. Hyde has also had several on-screen roles, appearing in Doghouse as the barmaid, and as the Corpse Queen in The Brothers Grimm. She also contributed to Harry Potter and the Philosopher's Stone as a tendril of the magical strangling Devil's Snare plant.

In 2013 Hyde was the producer of the short film "Wisdom", in which she voiced one of the characters, and in 2018, she was the co-executive producer of the short film September Man.

== Career as a sceptic ==
Hyde lecturing on The Restless Ghost of Wrocław at the European Skeptics Congress 2017

Hyde started to research and write about belief in the supernatural in the 1990s, and initially blogged under the name "Jourdemayne". This pen name was borrowed from a 15th-century woman, also known as the "Witch of Eye" who was eventually burnt for witchcraft in Smithfield, London in 1441. The persona was chosen by Hyde because "she was sought by many for her knowledge of dark matters".

Hyde's current website, deborahhyde.com, features blogposts and videos in which she takes an investigative approach to the interconnectedness of folklore, belief systems, and fear from unknown, natural phenomena. Her previous website, jourdemayne.com, was replaced in 2018. In her public appearances and writings, the following supernatural phenomena have been covered extensively:

- Werewolves
- Vampires
- Witches
- Demons
- Ghosts
- Fairies
- Krampus

=== Public appearances across the UK ===
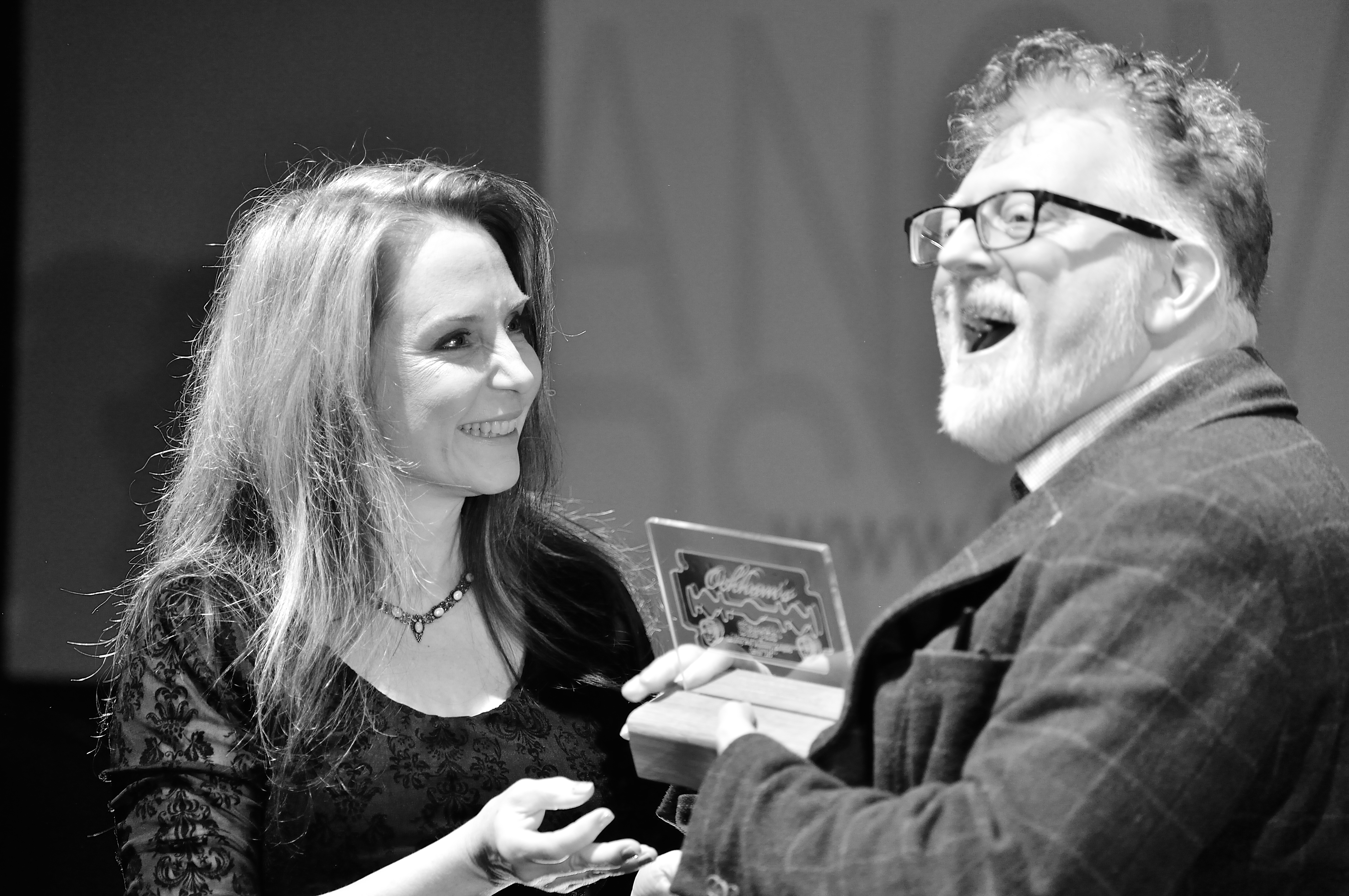
Hyde presenting the Ockham Editor's Choice Award to Crispian Jago at QED 2016.

Hyde has been invited to speak at several different events including Skeptics in the Pub gatherings all across the UK (Winchester, Liverpool, Birmingham, Wycombe, Manchester, Greenwich, etc.) as well as the international sceptics convention "QED – Question, Explore, Discover" in Manchester, where she is a regular speaker.

Hyde has spoken twice at the "Skeptics on the Fringe" in Edinburgh with two of her lectures, "Interview With a Vampire Expert" and "The Natural History of the European Werewolf", both of which were received well with the sceptical audience.

=== International appearances ===
Hyde's talks at conventions outside the UK have been given mostly in the US, including a post-Halloween public lecture on "The Natural History of the European Werewolf" for the New York City Skeptics, and an appearance with the same talk at Skepticon-5 in Springfield. She has also been invited to the Ratio Forum for Popular Science in Sofia, Bulgaria in 2013 where she gave a talk on Vampires and attended a panel discussion along with Susan Blackmore.

In 2017, Hyde delivered a presentation about The Restless Ghost of Wrocław at the 17th European Skeptics Congress at the University of Wrocław, Wrocław Poland.

In 2018, Hyde delivered a presentation about the historical roots of vampire folklore in Eastern Europe at CSICon in Las Vegas, Nevada.

=== Involvement in the Enfield Poltergeist case ===
In 2011, Hyde was asked to take part in a discussion on This Morning on ITV1 as an expert, representing the sceptical viewpoint about the Enfield Poltergeist case from 1977. Janet Hodgson, who had been a child at the time of the case, also made a rare appearance on the show, along with Guy Lyon Playfair, both of whom were deeply insulted by the rationalistic comments Hyde made during the discussion. This resulted in Lyon Playfair posting on his blog concerning this. This situation eventually led Hyde to write about the case and its background, providing a general explanation and several examples regarding why people fabricate malevolent figures.

=== Managing editor of The Skeptic ===
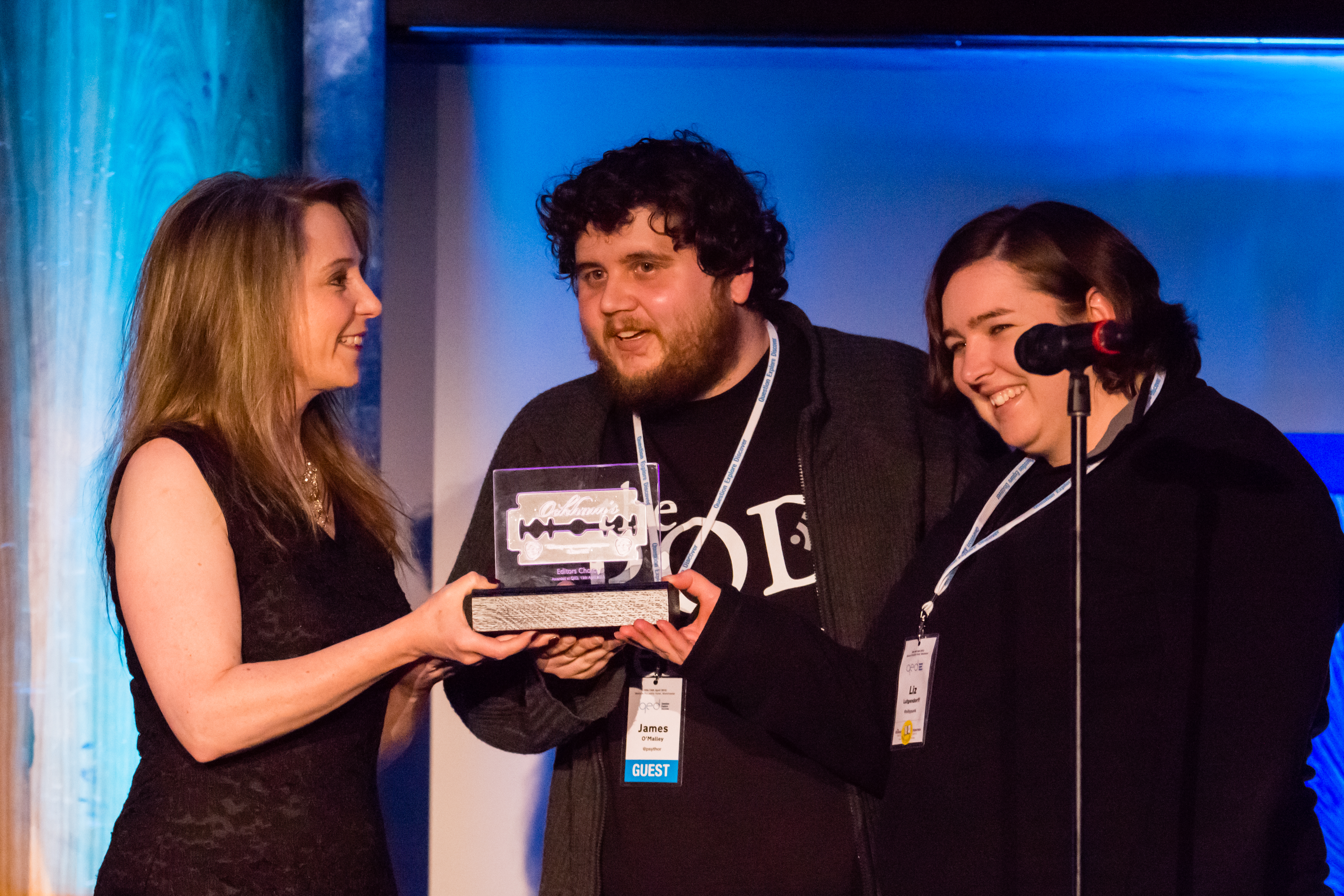
Deborah Hyde presenting James O'Malley and Liz Lutgendorff of The Pod Delusion with the Editors' Choice award at the 2013 Ockam Awards' Ceremony in Manchester, held as part of QEDcon 2013

In 2011, Hyde was appointed managing editor of The Skeptic, a UK magazine promoting science and critical thinking, succeeding Lindsay Kallis and many sceptics who had been editors in the past, including Chris French and founder of the magazine Wendy M. Grossman. The first issue of the magazine under her control was Volume 23 Issue 2 in 2011.

As editor-in-chief, Hyde has been working with an international advisory board of experts from many different fields, some of whom are globally recognised scientists, science educators and science enthusiasts, including Susan Blackmore, Stephen Fry, Derren Brown, Brian Cox, Richard Dawkins, Edzard Ernst, Robin Ince, PZ Myers, Phil Plait, Massimo Polidoro, Simon Singh, James Randi and Richard Wiseman.

=== The Ockham and Rusty Razor awards ===
In 2012, Hyde proposed the idea of a prize that could be given to those with serious achievements within different fields of sceptical activism, in order to provide recognition to people investing large amounts of work in promoting science and scepticism. Starting that year, the Ockham Awards Ceremony has been an annual event at "QED – Question, Explore, Discover". The prize is officially awarded by The Skeptic magazine in several categories, agreed upon by a committee featuring sceptics including Chris French, Richard Wiseman, Wendy Grossman, Jon Ronson and Simon Singh. In 2017, the "Rusty Razor" Award, an ignoble recognition for "bad thinking", was added to the proceedings.

=== Other activities as a sceptic ===
Hyde was co-convenor of Westminster Skeptics, and acts as a speaker-liaison of the Soho Skeptics, an independent think tank involving several organisations, writers, film-makers, podcasters to promote talks, panel discussions and other events in the London area.

=== Upcoming book ===
In a 2018 interview with Susan Gerbic, Hyde revealed that she is writing a book to be called Unnatural Predators that explores common themes in human folklore throughout history using a combination of historical, psychological, and anthropological perspectives.

== Awards and honors ==
In 2017, Hyde was elected as a fellow of the Committee for Skeptical Inquiry, a program of the Center for Inquiry in recognition of her work in sceptical media and events.

== Personal life ==
Deborah Hyde lives in West London.

== Gallery ==
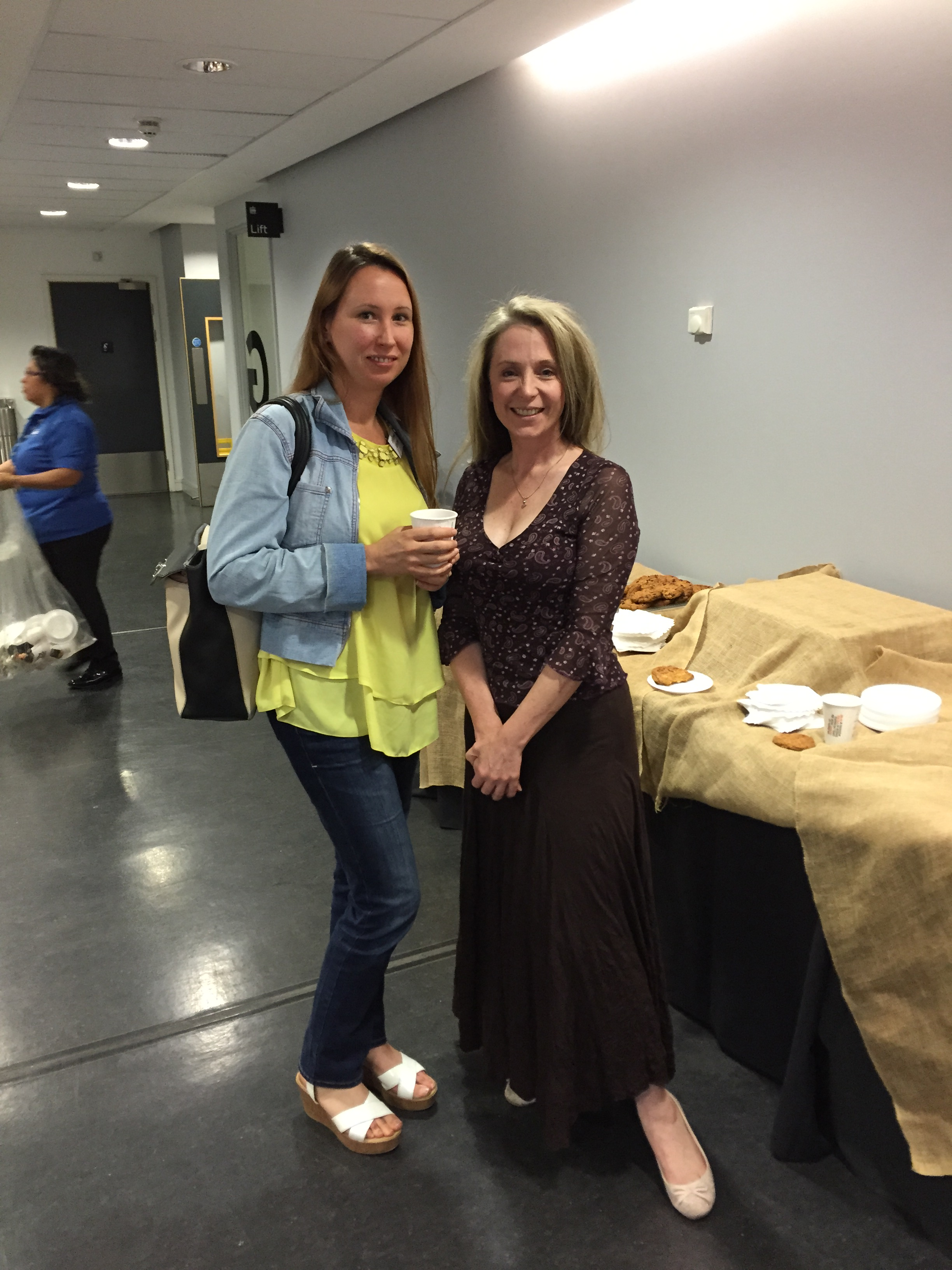
Deborah Hyde, editor of The Skeptic magazine with Jelena Levin, member of the GSoW group at the 16th European Skeptics Congress.

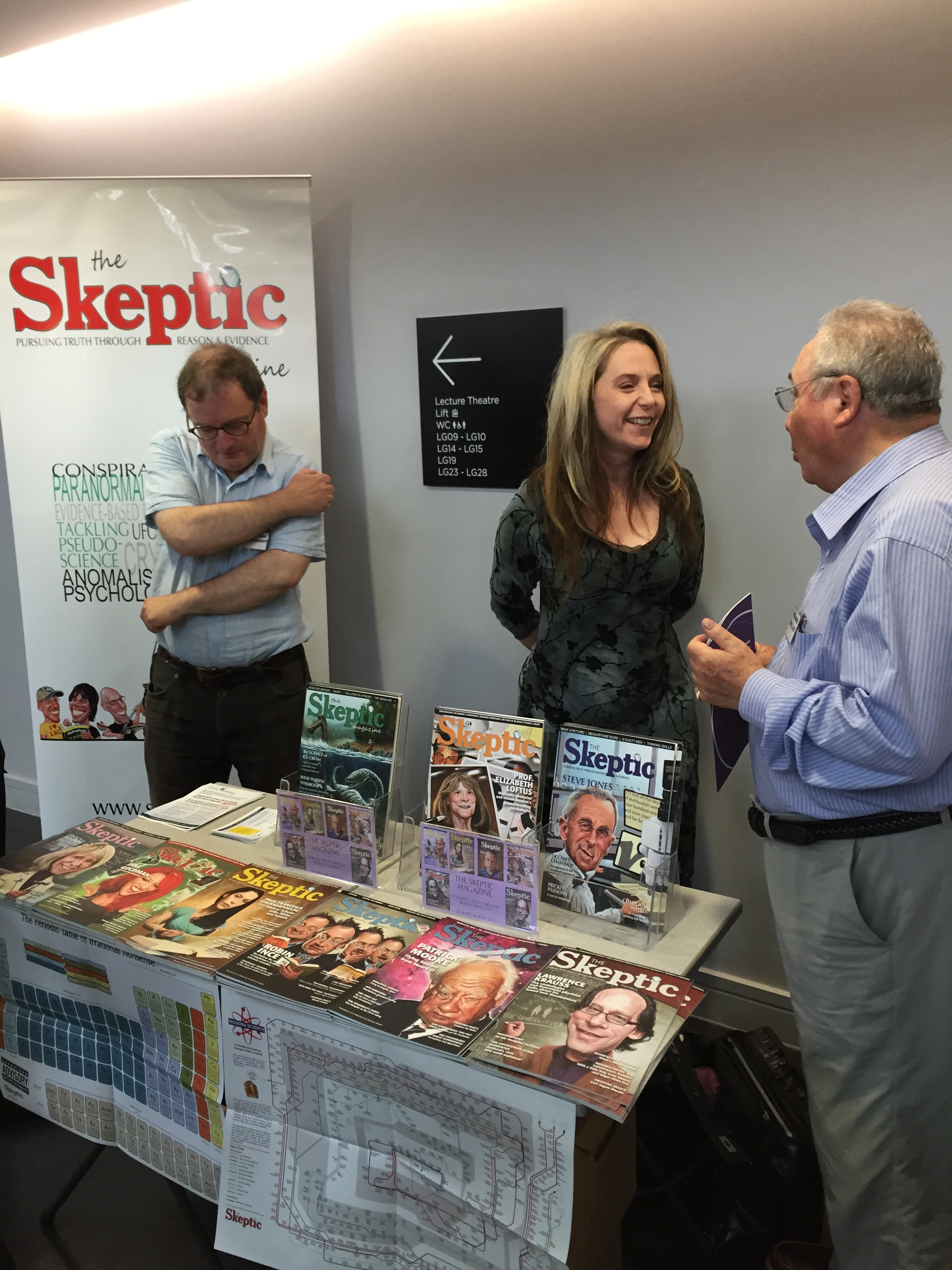
Deborah Hyde, editor of The Skeptic, standing behind the booth of the magazine, talking to attendees of the 16th European Skeptics Congress in London.

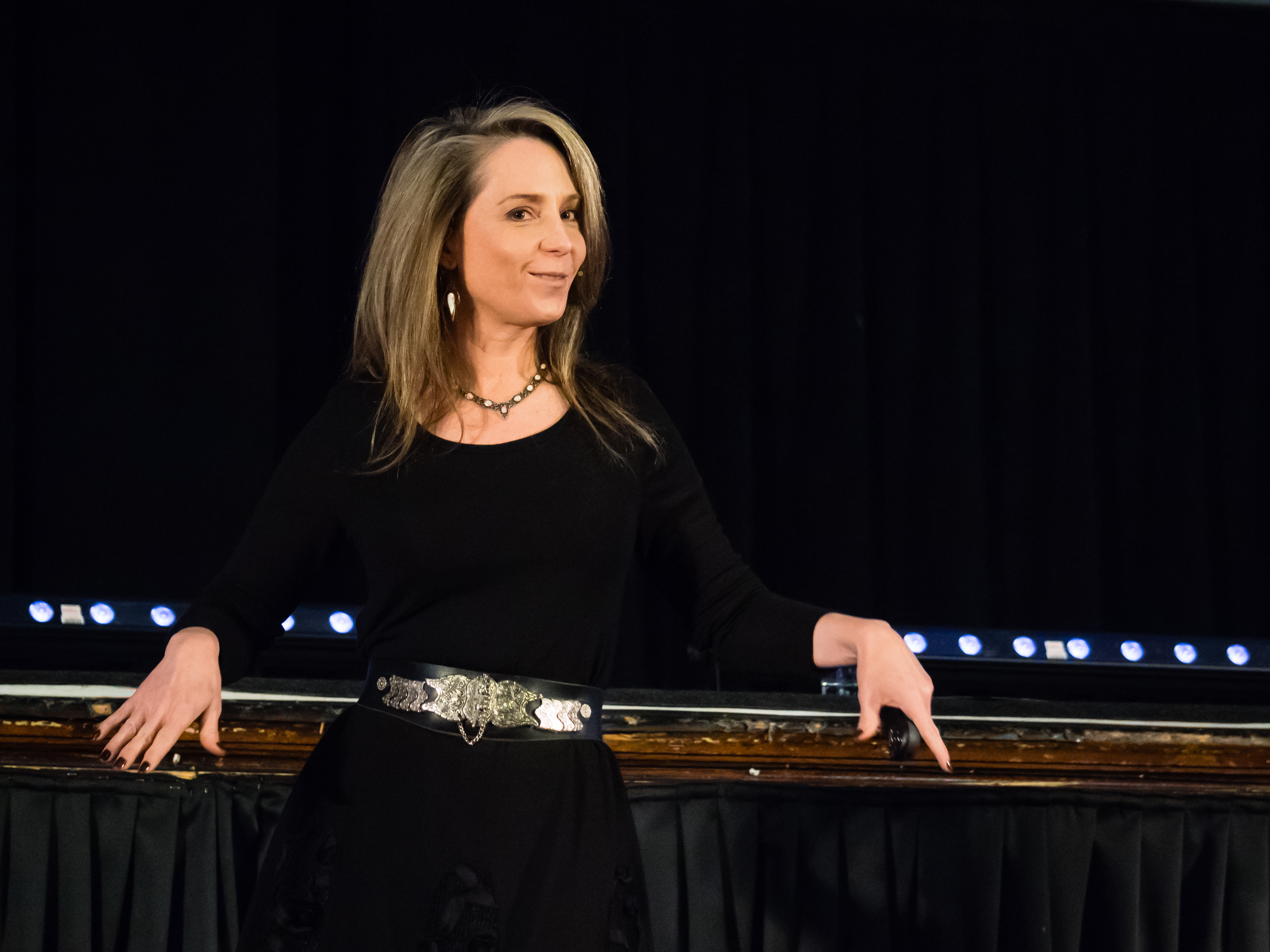
Deborah Hyde speaking at QEDcon on 13 April 2014 at The Palace Hotel, Manchester.

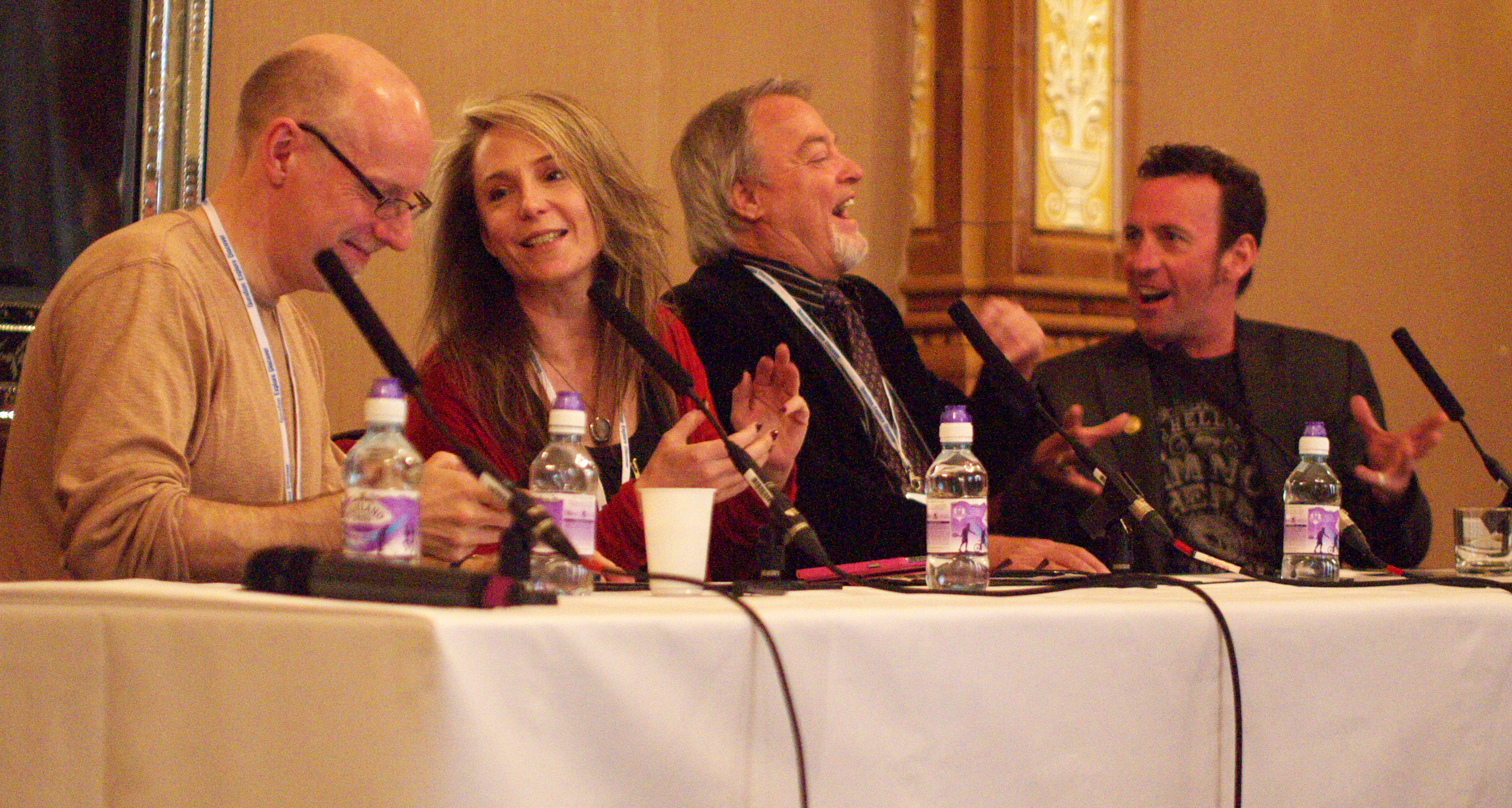
QEDCon 2014 Magic and Skepticism Panel: Richard Wiseman, Deborah Hyde (chair), Mark Edward and Paul Zenon sharing a joke before the panel started.

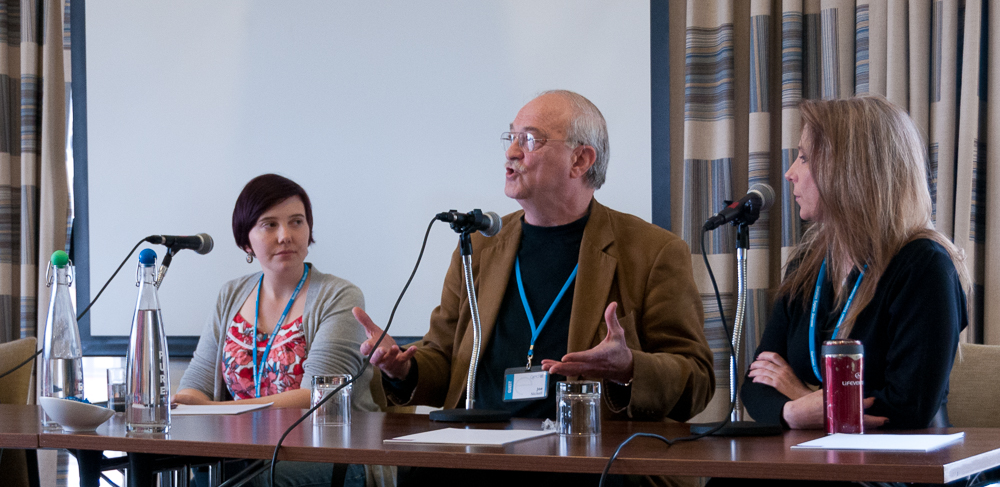
Joe Nickell, Hayley Stevens and Deborah Hyde on the Paranormal Investigations Panel at QED Con 2012.
