= Ukrain =

Chemical compound

- The chemical structure of ukrain as claimed by the manufacturer could not be determined in independent studies.

Clinical data
- Other names: celandine
- Dependence liability: Low
- Addiction liability: Low
- Routes of administration: intravenous and intramuscular

Legal status
- Legal status: US: Not FDA approved; Not recommended for cancer treatment

Identifiers
- CAS Number: 138069-52-0
- PubChem CID: 13456988
- ChemSpider: 140682
- UNII: 6251Q9UK1S

Chemical and physical data
- Formula: C_{66}H_{75}N_{6}O_{18}PS
- Molar mass: 1303.38 g·mol^{−1}
- 3D model (JSmol): Interactive image
- SMILES: C[N+]1(CC2=C(C=CC3=C2OCO3)C4C1C5=CC6=C(C=C5CC4O)OCO6)CCNP(=S)(NCC[N+]7(CC8=C(C=CC9=C8OCO9)C1C7C2=CC3=C(C=C2CC1O)OCO3)C)NCC[N+]1(CC2=C(C=CC3=C2OCO3)C2C1C1=CC3=C(C=C1CC2O)OCO3)C.[OH-].[OH-].[OH-]
- InChI: InChI=1S/C66H72N6O15PS.3H2O/c1-70(25-43-37(4-7-49-64(43)85-31-76-49)58-46(73)16-34-19-52-55(82-28-79-52)22-40(34)61(58)70)13-10-67-88(89,68-11-14-71(2)26-44-38(5-8-50-65(44)86-32-77-50)59-47(74)17-35-20-53-56(83-29-80-53)23-41(35)62(59)71)69-12-15-72(3)27-45-39(6-9-51-66(45)87-33-78-51)60-48(75)18-36-21-54-57(84-30-81-54)24-42(36)63(60)72;;;/h4-9,19-24,46-48,58-63,73-75H,10-18,25-33H2,1-3H3,(H3,67,68,69,89);3*1H2/q+3;;;/p-3; Key:KIGCDEJCMKDBHU-UHFFFAOYSA-K

Ukrain (Ukrainian: Україн; also called celandine) is the trademarked name of a semi-synthetic substance derived from the plant Chelidonium majus and promoted as a drug to treat cancer and viral infections, including HIV and hepatitis. It was created in 1978, by the famed Ukrainian chemist Vasyl Novytskyi (Ukrainian: Василь Новицький). Ukrain is named after the nation of Ukraine and is produced by the Austrian company Nowicky Pharma.

According to the American Cancer Society and the Memorial Sloan-Kettering Cancer Center, there is no evidence that Ukrain is an effective cancer treatment.

== Evidence ==
In 2005, Edzard Ernst led a review into evidence of the effectiveness of Ukrain. Although the review found evidence suggesting the drug was effective, it also concluded that "numerous caveats prevent a positive conclusion". Commenting on the review some years later, Ernst wrote on his blog that the results they were examining had seemed "too good to be true" – and on investigation the trials were very small in size, often seemed to include Novytskyi himself, and had significant methodological flaws. However, despite the cautious conclusion given, "this article became much cited. ... [Novytskyi] must have been delighted".

The Memorial Sloan-Kettering Cancer Center says that clinical trials have yet to prove safety and effectiveness of Ukrain. The American Cancer Society stated that, as of 2013, "available scientific evidence does not support claims that celandine is effective in treating cancer in humans". It may however be responsible for some adverse side-effects including hepatitis and allergic skin reactions.

== Legal incidents ==
Ukrain is not approved by the US Food and Drug Administration. On September 4, 2012, several people including Vasyl Novytskyi, the drug's developer, were arrested in Austria for distributing the drug under suspicion of commercial fraud. Novytskyi appeared in Vienna regional court again in January 2015 for selling Ukrain, earning an estimated 1.1 million euros through fraud by changing labels on expired vials. In March 2015, two co-defendants of Novytskyi were exonerated for commercial fraud, while legal proceedings continue for Novytskyi.

From October 2013 to April 2014, a licensed naturopath in Tucson, Arizona, Michael Uzick, was using Ukrain in his practice to treat cancer patients. He was reported to the Arizona authorities by Britt Marie Hermes, who discovered while working for Uzick that the unapproved drug was being imported. Uzick was given a letter of reprimand by the Arizona Naturopathic Physicians Medical Board.

== See also ==
- List of ineffective cancer treatments
- Thiotepa - a chemotherapeutic agent
