= QED (conference) =

Annual conference in Manchester, England

QED: Question, Explore, Discover
- Genre: Scientific skepticism
- Venue: Mercure Piccadilly Hotel (2011–2013, 2016–2025), The Palace Hotel (2013–2014)
- Locations: Manchester, England
- Inaugurated: 2011
- Most recent: 2025
- Attendance: 650 (2016)
- Organizer: North West Skeptical Events Ltd
- Website: qedcon.org

QED: Question, Explore, Discover (also called QEDcon or simply QED (Note: UK: //ˌkjuːiːˈdiː//.)) was an annual skeptical conference held in Manchester, England from 2011 until 2025. QED was organised by North West Skeptical Events Ltd (NWSE), a volunteer-owned non-profit organisation originating from a collaboration between the Merseyside Skeptics Society and the Greater Manchester Skeptics Society.

== History ==
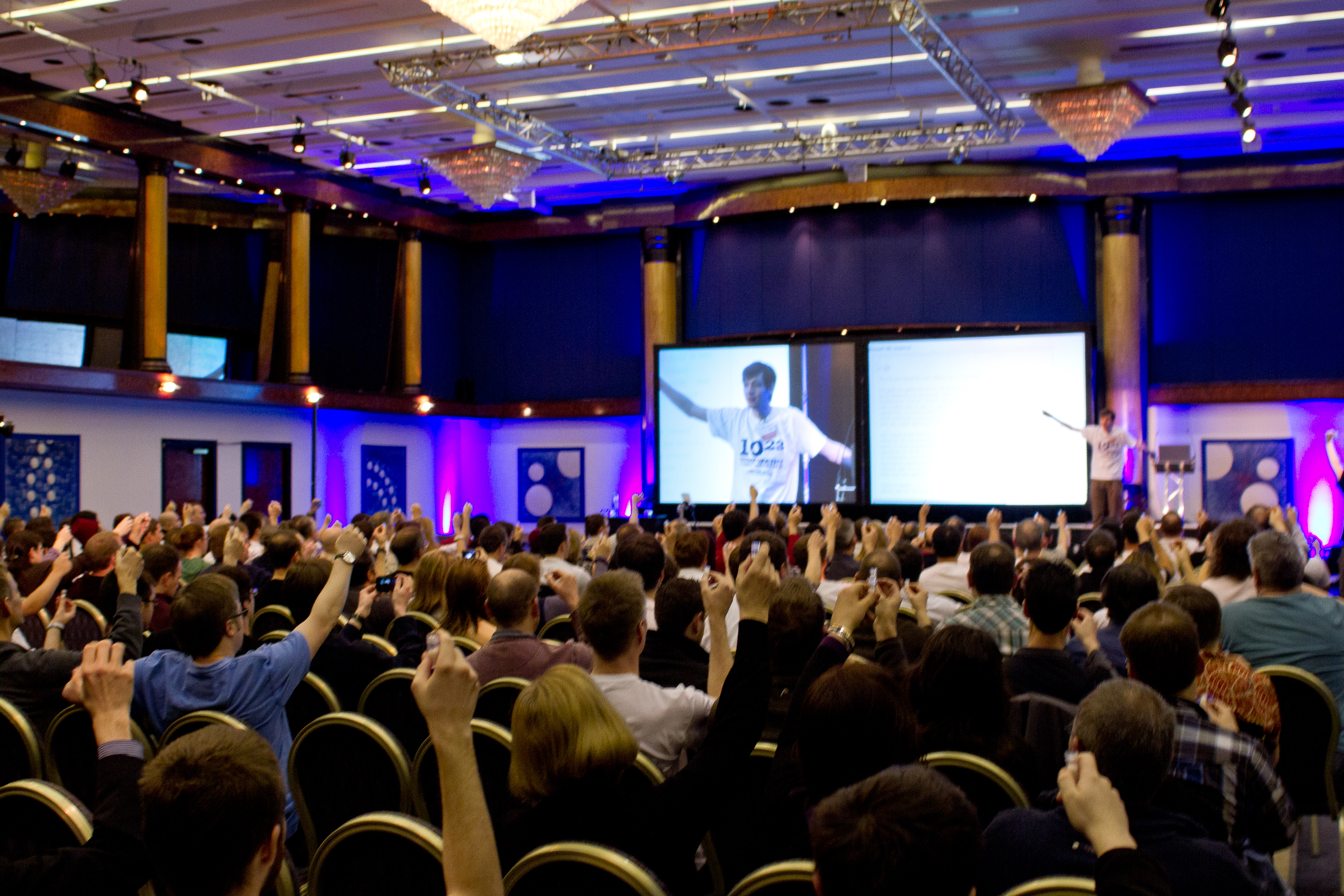
Marsh leads the homeopathic overdose at QED 2011.

Starting in February 2011 the Merseyside Skeptics Society, in conjunction with the Greater Manchester Skeptics Society, began organising and presenting an annual two-day skeptical science festival, QED: Question, Explore, Discover.

The master of ceremonies for the first QED was George Hrab. Notable speakers included Steven Novella and Eugenie Scott, and episodes of three podcasts, InKredulous, The Pod Delusion, and Strange Quarks, were recorded live during the event. In an article about the first QED conference on the Committee for Skeptical Inquiry website, Kylie Sturgess said, "The organisers of QEDCon didn't need to proclaim the success of their convention from the stage — it was evident from the beginning to the end." The conference was part of the 2011 10:23 Campaign, with The Challenge culminating in a homeopathic overdose on Belladonna by 350 participants of QED.

By 2016, QED had grown out to 650 attendees, with multiple simultaneous sessions in various formats, covering a wide range of topics "from ethics in magic to evolutionary biology to effective science communication and everything in between." Incumbent ECSO President Claire Klingenberg formerly described QED as "a very high-energy event", where "both the audience and the speakers are on average young and very active in their fields of interest." She said there were "so many brilliant people mulling around and simply not enough time to see and do everything, which makes you want to come back next year."

October 2018 QED event was the largest conference to date. The weekend was hosted by Helen Arney, along with speakers from around the world including; Steven Novella, Chris French and Michael Marshall, giving presentations on topics such as the fallacies of the wellness industry and the history of poltergeists. Alex Moshakis from The Observer, attending QED 2018, found the "underlining message related more to the skeptical process: how to become a more effective critical thinker".

== Setup ==
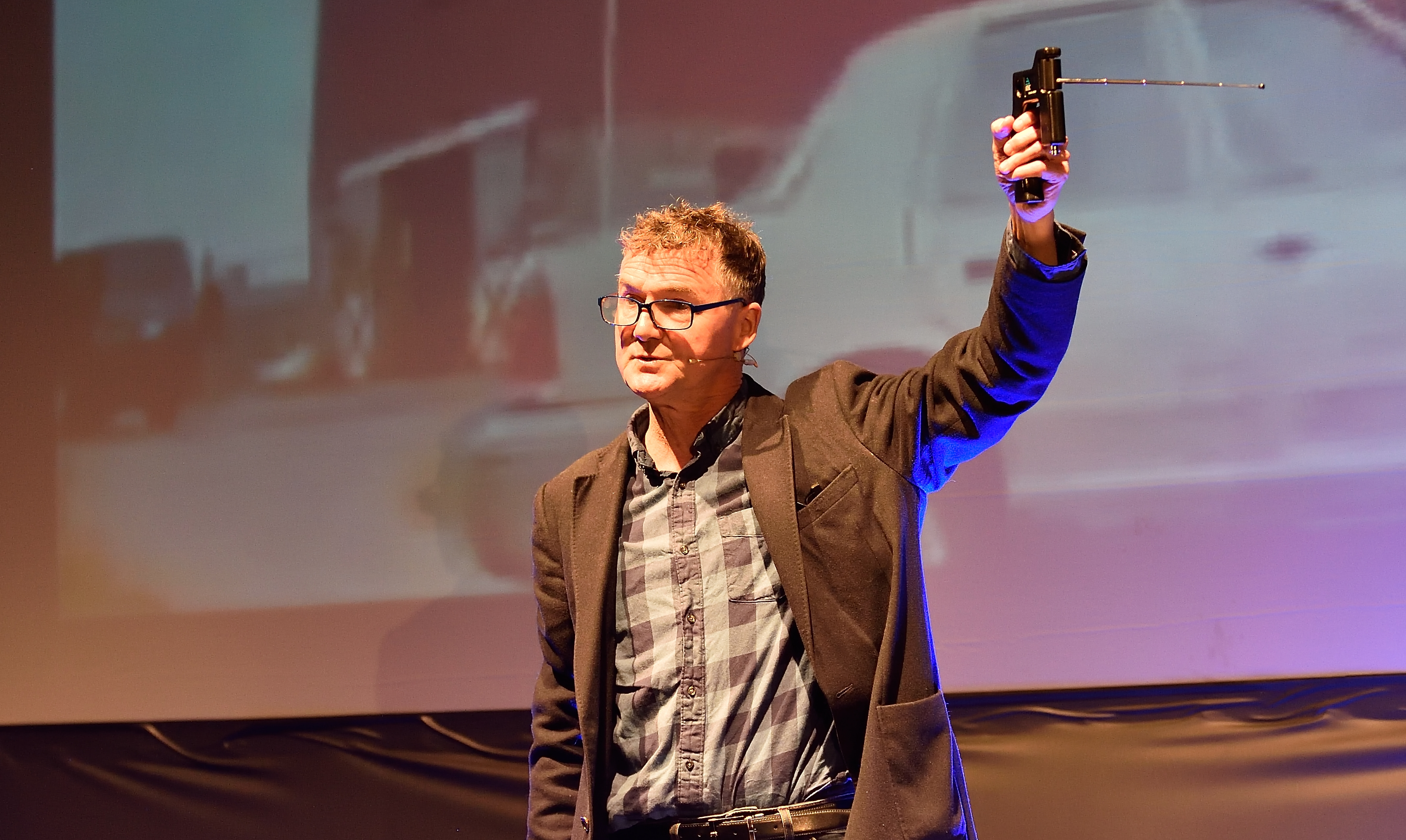
Investigative journalist Meirion Jones at QED 2016 lecturing about the fake bomb detector ADE 651 that he helped expose

QED is organised by volunteers, and any proceeds go back into future events or to charities. In the first year, these charities were Sense about Science and the National Autistic Society. On the Token Skeptic podcast, co-organiser Michael Marshall ("Marsh") commented:

How we try to always pitch it and how we try and run it is – it's all about the skeptical community. Because it's being run by people who are just part of that community who are doing this because we really love it, the atmosphere, seems to be, of people coming together. It's kind of a big party, a celebration of UK skepticism and also international skepticism.

QED formally comprises two days, a Saturday and a Sunday. It is preceded by so-called "fringe events", with a Skeptics in the Pub event on Thursday night, a SkeptiCamp on Friday morning and afternoon, following by a pub quiz, and finally an informal socialising event known as the "QED Mixer". The fringe events are free to attend and do not require a QED ticket.

The general setup of the QED agenda is to have several main speakers who give lectures and workshops, live podcasts and panel discussions, alternated with in-depth sessions that most often run in parallel. Some documentary films about scientific skepticism are screened, with Science Moms (2017) having had its world premiere at QED. Many sessions are filmed, and can be viewed on YouTube afterwards. On Saturday night, several social events are organised, such as a gala dinner, magic and comedy shows, and the Ockham Award ceremony.

== Ockham Awards ==
The Skeptic magazine annually awards the Ockham Awards, or simply the Ockhams, at QED. This occurred for the first time in 2012, and the award ceremony has been considered a highlight of the conference ever since. The Ockhams were introduced by editor-in-chief Deborah Hyde to "recognise the effort and time that have gone into the community’s favourite skeptical blogs, skeptical podcasts, skeptical campaigns and outstanding contributors to the skeptical cause."

The name refers to Ockham's razor, formulated by English philosopher William of Ockham (c. 1285–1347). The trophies, designed by Neil Davies and Karl Derrick, carry the upper text "Ockham's" and the lower text "The Skeptic. Shaving away unnecessary assumptions since 1285." Between the texts, there is an image of a double-edged safety razorblade, and both lower corners feature an image of William of Ockham's face.

== Events ==
Event	Date	Venue	Notes
QED 2011	5–6 February 2011	Mercure Piccadilly Hotel	Part of the 10:23 Campaign. Speakers included Chris Atkins, Chris French, Wendy M. Grossman, George Hrab (emcee), Robin Ince, Ciarán O'Keeffe, Jim Al-Khalili, Steven Novella, Matt Parker, Jon Ronson, Eugenie Scott, Simon Singh, and Kylie Sturgess.
QED 2012	10–11 March 2012	Mercure Piccadilly Hotel	Sponsored by the Richard Dawkins Foundation for Reason and Science. Speakers included David Aaronovitch, Ophelia Benson, Alun Cochrane, Edzard Ernst, D. J. Grothe, Deborah Hyde, Robin Ince, Maryam Namazie, Joe Nickell, Massimo Polidoro, Ian Ridpath, Richard Saunders, Richard Wiseman, and Paul Zenon.
QED 2013	13–14 April 2013	Mercure Piccadilly Hotel	Sponsored by the Richard Dawkins Foundation for Reason and Science and the British Humanist Association. Speakers included Mitch Benn, Stevyn Colgan, Helen Czerski, Richard Dawkins, Rachael Dunlop, Jeff Forshaw, Natalie Haynes, Lawrence Krauss, Michael Legge, Mark Lynas, Brooke Magnanti, Michael Marshall, Brendan O'Neill, Carrie Poppy, Adam Rutherford, Rose Shapiro, Simon Singh, and Richard Wiseman.
QED 2014	12–13 April 2014	The Palace Hotel	Sponsored by New Scientist magazine and Gloo Communications. Speakers included Coralie Colmez, Mark Crislip, Mark Edward, Susan Gerbic, Loz Kaye, Robert Llewellyn, Michael Marshall, Nathan Phelps, Elizabeth Pisani, John-Luke Roberts, Angela Saini, Samantha Stein, Richard Wiseman, Andy Zaltzman, and Paul Zenon (emcee).
QED 2015	24–26 April 2015	The Palace Hotel	Sponsored by Gloo Communications and Supergrizzly.tv. Speakers included Ryan J. Bell, Mitch Benn (emcee), Matt Dillahunty, Jay Foreman, A. C. Grayling, Lucie Green, Harriet Hall, Natalie Haynes, Jennifer Michael Hecht, Bruce Hood, Deborah Hyde, Dame Sue Ion, Michael Marshall, Aron Ra, and Kate Smurthwaite.
QED 2016	14–16 October 2016	Mercure Piccadilly Hotel	Speakers included Susan Blackmore, Stevyn Colgan, Britt Marie Hermes, Deborah Hyde, Meirion Jones, Dr Karl, Michael Marshall, Alan Melikdjanian, Matt Parker (emcee), Grace Petrie, Cara Santa Maria, Simon Singh, Mark Stevenson, Caroline Watt, Richard Wiseman, and Paul Zenon.
QED 2017	13–15 October 2017	Mercure Piccadilly Hotel	Speakers included James Ball, Helen Czerski, Jeff Forshaw, Chris French, Elio M. García, David Gorski, Britt Marie Hermes, Deborah Hyde, Robin Ince, Helen Keen, Michael Legge, Michael Marshall, Timothy John O'Brien, Phil Scraton, Simon Singh, Carol Tavris, Anthony Warner, Sophie Wilson, and Richard Wiseman. The documentary Science Moms had its world premiere.
QED 2018	11–14 October 2018	Mercure Piccadilly Hotel	Speakers included Helen Arney, Claire Benson, Evan Bernstein, Heather Ellis, Hannah Fry, George Hrab, Deborah Hyde, Michael Marshall, Bob Novella, Jay Novella, Steve Novella, Massimo Polidoro, Cara Santa Maria, Sophie Scott, Pixie Turner, J Willgoose, Bryce Blankenagel, Eli Bosnick, Trent Burton, Pontus Böckman, Dallas Campbell, Sarah Clement, Alun Cochrane, Anne-Marie Cundy, Tom Curry, Helen Czerski, Carmen D’Cruz, Lana Donaghy, Brian Eggo, Heath Enwright, Wally Funk, Anthony Holloway, Robin Ince, Jonathan Jarry, Navneet Kapur, Claire Klingenberg, Noah Lugeons, Emma McClure, Paul Duncan McGarrity, Milton Mermikides, Sue Nelson, Elle Osili-Wood, András Pintér, Greg Rattey, Ariane Sherine, Sean Slater, Thomas Smith, Marianne Talbot, Nicola Throp, Ash Webster, and Matt Winning.
QED 2022	28–30 October 2022	Mercure Piccadilly Hotel	Speakers included Eli Bosnick, Heath Enwright, God Awful Movies, Chris Jackson, Noah Lugeons, Fern Riddell, Ema Sullivan-Bissett, Joy Y. Zhang, and Paul Duncan McGarrity.
QED 2023	23–24 September 2023	Mercure Piccadilly Hotel	Speakers included Colin Angus, Lucy Cooke, Dan Friesen, Debbie Ging, Joyce Harper, Alice Howarth, Daniel Jolley, Claire Klingenberg, Cara Santa Maria, Kirsty Sedgman, Andrew Smyth, Anna Williams, Bec Hill (emcee), Helen Arney, Clio Bellenis, Andrew Brennand, David Clarke, Catherine de Jong, Siân Docksey, Lana Donaghy, Brian Eggo, Laura Eggo, Kevin Felstead, Chris French, Ciara Greene, Mike Hall, Anja Harrison, Jordan Holmes, Mark Horne, Deborah Hyde, Crispian Jago, Michael Marshall, Rick Owen, Anita Powell, Aaron Rabinowitz, Ahir Shah, Hayley Stevens, Nicola Throp, James Williams, and Andy Wilson.
QED 2024	19–20 October 2024	Mercure Piccadilly Hotel	Speakers included Siân Docksey, Agnes Arnold-Forster, Flint Dibble, Bola Grace, Sabine Hossenfelder, Robin Ince, Idrees Mughal, Joe Ondrak, Jenny Radcliffe, Rina Raphael, Shema Tariq, James Wilson, and Richard Wiseman.
QED 2025	25–26 October 2025	Mercure Piccadilly Hotel	Speakers included Robin Ince (emcee), Subhadra Das, Annie Kelly, Suze Kundu, Michael Marshall, Emma McLachlan, Sian Norris, Lucia Osborne-Crowley, Cyriac Abby Philips, Naomi Ryan, Matthew Sweet, Paul Zenon, David Alnwick, Pontus Böckman, Eli Bosnick, Cecil Cicirello, Lizzi Collinge, Andrew Copson, Brian Eggo, Ruth Ehrlich, Heath Enwright, Chris French, Jamie Gallagher, Stella Gaynor, Mike Hall, Maeve Hanan, Rosie Holt, Mark Horne, Alice Howarth, Mark Johnson, Alex Kealy Matt Kemp Claire Klingenberg, Asher Larmie, Noah Lugeons, Angela Meadows, Emma Monk, Joe Ondrak, Rick Owen, András Pintér, Icy Sedgwick Ian Smith, Lydia Smith, Thomas Smith, Ciaran Talbot, Louise Thompson, Nicola Throp, Andy Wilson, and Richard Wiseman
