= Britt Marie Hermes =

American former naturopathic doctor and blogger (born 1984)

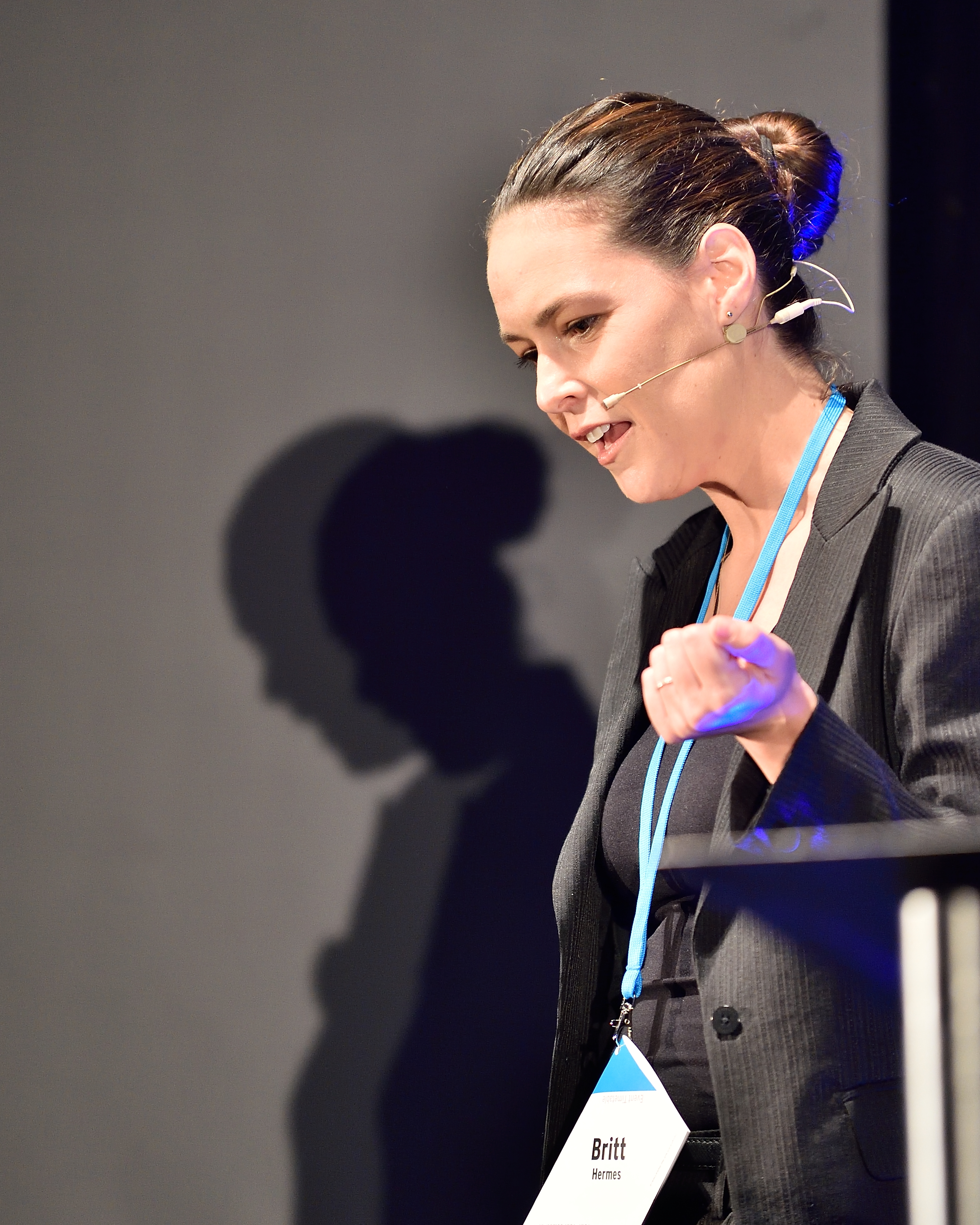
- Hermes speaking at QED 2016 in Manchester, England
- Born: Britt Marie Deegan; 1984 (age 41–42); California, U.S.
- Education: San Diego State University, 2006 (B.A.); Bastyr University, 2011 (N.D.); University of Kiel, 2017 (M.Sc.), 2022 (PhD)
- Occupation: Post-doctoral researcher
- Years active: 2011–2014 (naturopathic doctor); 2015–present (blogger, scientist)
- Known for: Naturopathy, scientific skepticism, blogging
- Scientific career
- Thesis: Characterization of Skin-Resident Microbiota in Inflammatory Cutaneous Disease (2022)
- Doctoral advisor: John F. Baines
- Hermes' voice Recorded October 2018
- Website: www.brittmariehermes.org

Britt Marie Hermes (née Deegan; born 1984) is an American former naturopathic doctor who became a critic of naturopathy and alternative medicine. She is the author of a blog, Naturopathic Diaries, where she writes about being trained and having practiced as a licensed naturopath and about the problems with naturopaths as medical practitioners.

Hermes' writings deal with the education and practices of licensed naturopaths in North America, and she is a noted opponent of alternative medicine. Hermes has been dubbed a whistleblower on the naturopathic profession and a "naturopathic apostate".

== Early life, education and career ==
Hermes was born and grew up in California, and in 2002 graduated from Oak Park High School in Ventura County, California. Hermes has said that she became interested in natural medicine while in high school to treat her psoriasis, and that "A bad experience with a doctor as a teen pushed her to pursue a career in naturopathic medicine". In 2006, she graduated from San Diego State University with a bachelor's degree in psychology (magna cum laude) and earned membership in the Phi Beta Kappa honor society.

Hermes received her N.D. in 2011 from Bastyr University in Kenmore, Washington. She was first licensed as a Naturopathic Physician in Washington state, where she then completed a one-year residency at a naturopathic clinic in Seattle focused on pediatrics and family medicine. Prior to graduating from the N.D. program, Hermes travelled to Ghana and Nicaragua with other students from Bastyr to provide naturopathic care to rural communities.

Hermes moved to Tucson, Arizona, where she practiced until 2014 using the title “naturopathic medical doctor.” There she worked in an outpatient naturopathic clinic. She had a Federal DEA number that allowed her to prescribe controlled substances. And in her practice, she prescribed drugs and ordered tests like X-rays, MRIs, and blood work. After witnessing illegal and unethical treatments of cancer patients and discerning that such practices were common in her field, due to poor education and low professional standards, she decided to leave the practice of naturopathy.

While Hermes was working for Michael Uzick, Uzick was given a letter of reprimand by the Arizona Naturopathic Physicians Board of Examiners for administering Ukrain that he obtained from an unregistered source. Hermes characterized this disciplinary action as a "token punishment" and a "slap on the wrist."

In 2016, Hermes earned an MSc in biomedicine at the University of Kiel in Germany specialising in the mammalian microbiome. In 2022, Hermes completed her PhD at Kiel in evolutionary genomics and the skin microbiome, studying the signatures of co-adoptation between microbes that are living on humans and the human genome.

Hermes was joint winner of the 2018 John Maddox Prize, awarded by Sense about Science. As an "early career researcher 'in recognition of her advocacy and writing on evidence-based medicine'". Judge Colin Blakemore stated that "Hermes's story is one of exceptional courage".

After completing her PhD, Hermes became a post-doctoral researcher at the Max Planck Institute in the section of evolutionary medicine.

== Naturopathic Diaries ==
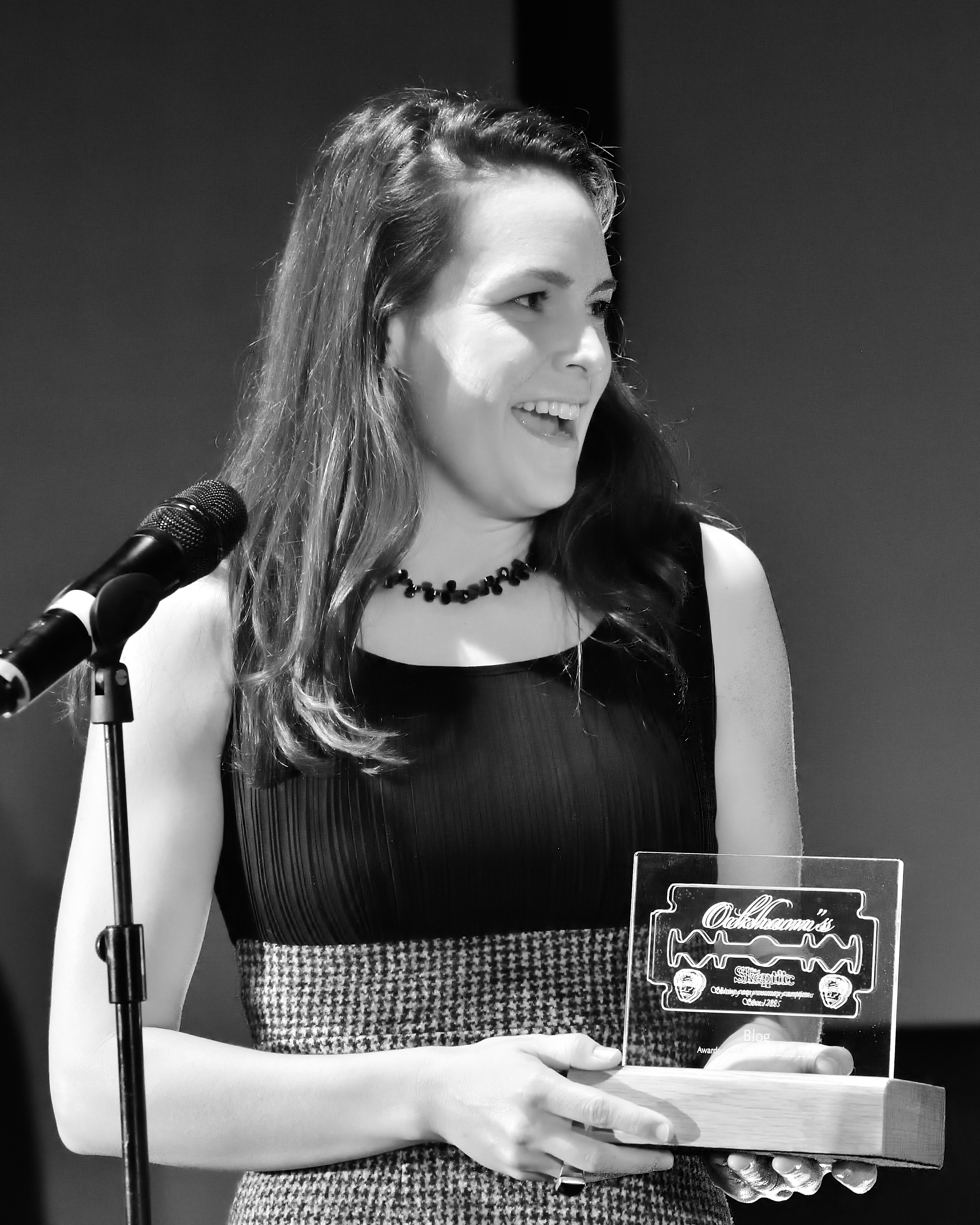
Hermes receiving the 2016 Ockham Award for Best Blog given by The Skeptic magazine at QED

In 2015, Hermes started a blog, Naturopathic Diaries, that is "aimed at contextualizing the false information proliferated by the naturopathic profession." Hermes is concerned with a lack of informed consent when naturopaths practice and the failure of naturopaths to employ science-based medicine. Her blog provides an insider's perspective on how naturopaths practice and are trained. Naturopathic Diaries was given the 2016 Ockham Award for Best Blog by The Skeptic magazine.

Hermes has documented that naturopathic organizations make misleading claims about naturopathic education in comparison to the training of medical doctors. She contends that accredited naturopathic programs do not adequately prepare students to become competent medical practitioners. Hermes argues that naturopaths are not able to recognize serious health conditions and treat according to the standard of care due to inadequate medical training.

Hermes has described her experiences observing licensed naturopaths frequently misdiagnosing patients and providing inappropriate medical advice, such as advising against vaccinations and treating cancer with alternative methods. She has characterized naturopathic methods, especially ones using vitamins and supplements, as lacking adequate scientific evidence and based on exaggerated health claims. Hermes' views are consistent with and elaborate upon previous criticisms of naturopathic education and practice.

== Advocacy ==
Hermes believes that naturopathic doctors are misrepresenting their medical competency to the public and lawmakers. She maintains the following policy positions on the regulation of naturopathic doctors:

- That such naturopaths should not be permitted to use the title "doctor" or "physician", as doing so misleads patients into thinking naturopaths have medical training commensurate with that of physicians practicing evidence-based medicine.
- That they should be prohibited from treating children, as this might lead to patient harm. In arguing this, Hermes highlights the case of a Canadian toddler that died after failing to receive prudent medical care for bacterial meningitis, after a tincture of echinacea treatment from a licensed Alberta naturopath. In the case, the parents were convicted, criminally, as they had been advised by a nurse to see a doctor, but the naturopath was cleared on evidence that the prescription was sought without examination of the child.
- That they should not be granted medical licenses, and where already licensed their scope of practice should be reduced.

Hermes started a Change.org petition, "Naturopaths are not doctors", to raise awareness of the shortcomings of naturopathic medicine and the naturopathic profession's political agenda of gaining licensure in 50 U.S. states by 2025 and participation in Medicare. Naturopaths, including the American Association of Naturopathic Physicians, have accused her of defamation against the naturopathic profession.

When she was asked in an interview about the harm that could come from believing naturopathy, she responded,

1. Cost "these treatments could be very expensive sometimes costing thousands of dollars.
2. Believing in magic "patients would forego conventional treatments, and this... Can delay treatment or preventing them getting the treatment that could potentially save their life."

Speaking at CSIcon Las Vegas 2017, Hermes described herself as delusional regarding her naturopathic education, describing the teaching at naturopathic schools as pseudoscience.

In a separate interview in 2018 she commented on one of the distinctions between naturopathic medicine and science-based medicine, stating that "When you’re going through naturopathic school, we’re told that what we’re being taught is evidence-based or science-based. These are different things. Evidence-based doesn’t mean the same thing as science-based. Homeopathy is a really good example to try to differentiate these terms. You can find evidence, even randomized controlled trials, that make it look like homeopathy might work. You pull from that body of research. You cherry-pick those studies. Now you have an evidence-based therapy. Science-based means that it’s actually plausible. Homeopathy is not science-based. It’s nonsense. It breaks the laws of physics. It’s not plausible. The argument is that we should make sure something is science-based before we even move on to studying it. It should pass the science test first".

Hermes also contributes to Science-Based Medicine, KevinMD, Science 2.0., and Forbes. As of 2016, an anonymous blog had been set up, aiming to dispute Hermes's claims, a blog that cites low-quality studies by naturopaths in defense of naturopathic practices.

== Lawsuit ==
US-based naturopath Colleen Huber filed a defamation lawsuit against Hermes in Germany over her statements about natural cancer treatments and research which were published in a blog post about Huber. The lawsuit was filed in Kiel, Germany on September 17, 2017.

Australian Skeptics managed a fundraising campaign to assist Hermes in her defense. The campaign met its initial goal of A$80,000 within the first nine days. In an interview on the European Skeptics Podcast, the president of Australian Skeptics, Eran Segev, spoke positively about the fundraising campaign saying that "the skeptical community does rally behind people. We have seen this with Ken Harvey. We are seeing it again now".

On June 3, 2019, Hermes announced in Naturopathic Diaries that "On May 24, 2019, the District Court (Landgericht) of Kiel, Germany ruled against naturopathic cancer quack Colleen Huber in a defamation lawsuit she brought against me." Hermes also said that Huber could appeal until early July 2019, "which I would zealously fight". In a presentation a CSICon in Las Vegas in October, 2019, Hermes noted that the appeals deadline had passed and therefore Huber cannot sue her again for these points in Germany. The entire history of the lawsuit was described by Hermes in a 2020 article in Skeptical Inquirer.

== Publications ==
- "Beware the Naturopathic Cancer Quack", Skeptical Inquirer, 2020.
- "An Inside Look at Naturopathic Medicine: A Whistleblower's Deconstruction of Its Core Principles" in Pseudoscience: The Conspiracy Against Science, 2018
- Publications on PubMed
