= Michael Marshall (skeptic) =

British skeptical activist and journalist (born 1983)

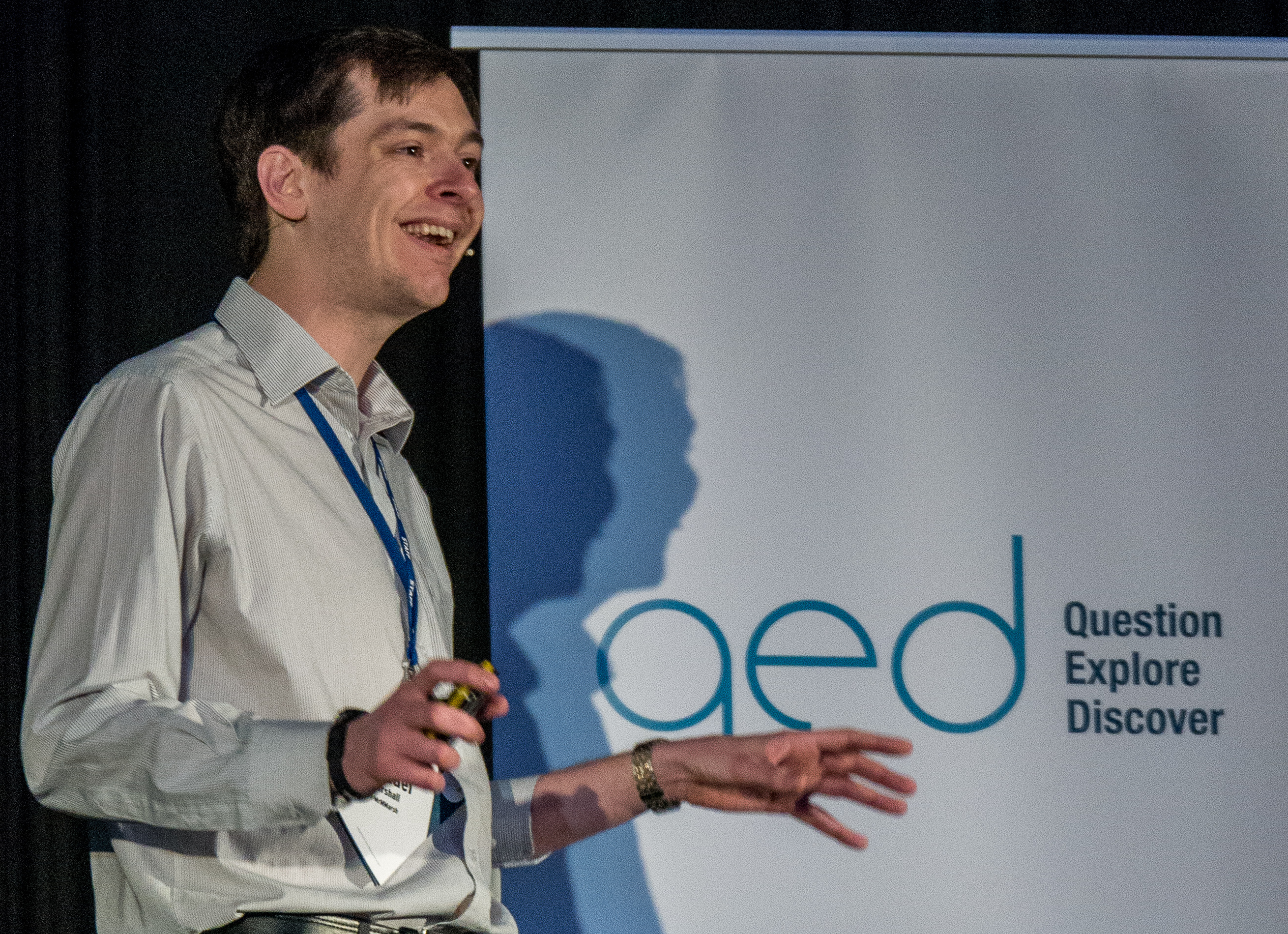
- Michael Marshall at QED 2015.
- Born: 13 August 1983 (age 43); Bishop Auckland, England
- Occupations: Freelance journalist, public speaker, skeptical activist, editor – The Skeptic
- Employer: Good Thinking Society
- Organization(s): Merseyside Skeptics Society, Good Thinking Society
- Known for: Skeptical activism
- Spouse: Nicola Throp (2015–present)
- Michael Marshall's voice Recorded October 2016

Michael "Marsh" Marshall (born 13 August 1983) is a British skeptical activist and the editor of The Skeptic magazine since September 2020. He is the co-founder and vice-president of the Merseyside Skeptics Society and co-host of its official podcast, Skeptics with a K, project director of the Good Thinking Society, and has occasionally written for The Times, The Guardian and New Statesman. As of 2022, Marshall is a fellow with the Committee for Skeptical Inquiry.

== Early life and influences ==
Marshall was born on 13 August 1983 in Bishop Auckland, North East England. He obtained a BA in English at Liverpool, and has worked there in marketing and web design since. He traces his interest in skepticism to Penn and Teller's Bullshit! series. Researching why Teller never speaks led him to The Skeptics' Guide to the Universe podcast, and from there he discovered James Randi's Flim-Flam! and Carl Sagan's The Demon-Haunted World.

== Merseyside Skeptics Society ==
=== Foundation ===
"Skepticism is a Sisyphan struggle."
Marsh on the goal of scientific skepticism, describing it as a Sisyphan struggle against pseudoscience.

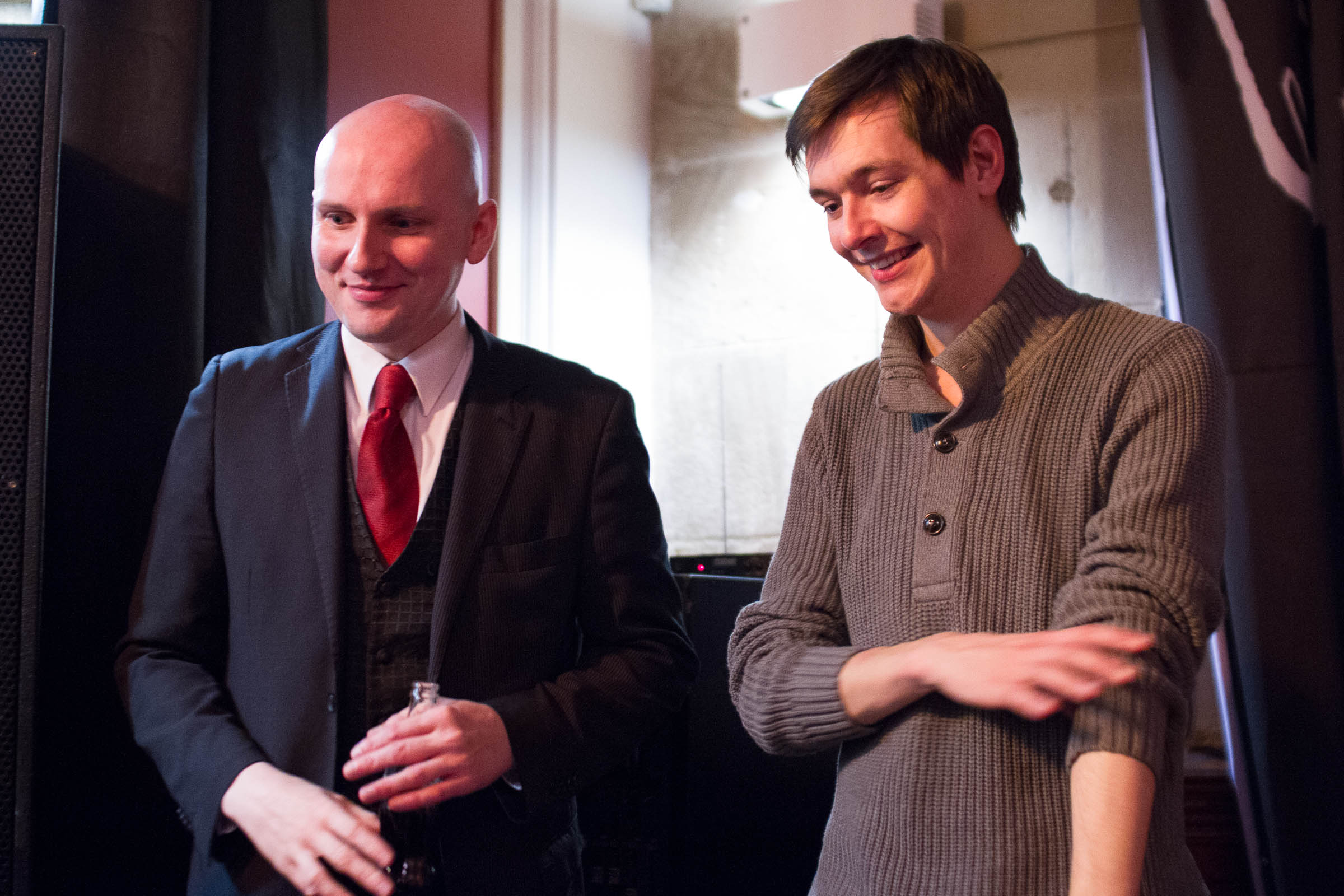
Mike Hall (L) and Michael "Marsh" Marshall of the Merseyside Skeptics Society and "Skeptics with a K" podcast, pictured at a Skeptics in the Pub event in Liverpool.

In February 2009, Marshall, Mike Hall and Colin Harris founded the Merseyside Skeptics Society. He commented that skepticism is "not about just saying 'no' to things, it's about thinking about them. And we use the American spelling – skeptic – because, in the States, the word isn't as strongly linked to cynicism. It's not seen as being as negative as it is over here." In July that year, they launched the podcast Skeptics with a K, which Marshall described as "a fairly-shambolic, overly-enthusiastic and snarky mix of science, skepticism and sarcasm". The idea for SwaK came from the conversations Hall and Marsh were having in the pub about news and ideas, such as a homoeopathy overdose, that they wanted to share with a wider audience.

=== 10:23 Campaign ===
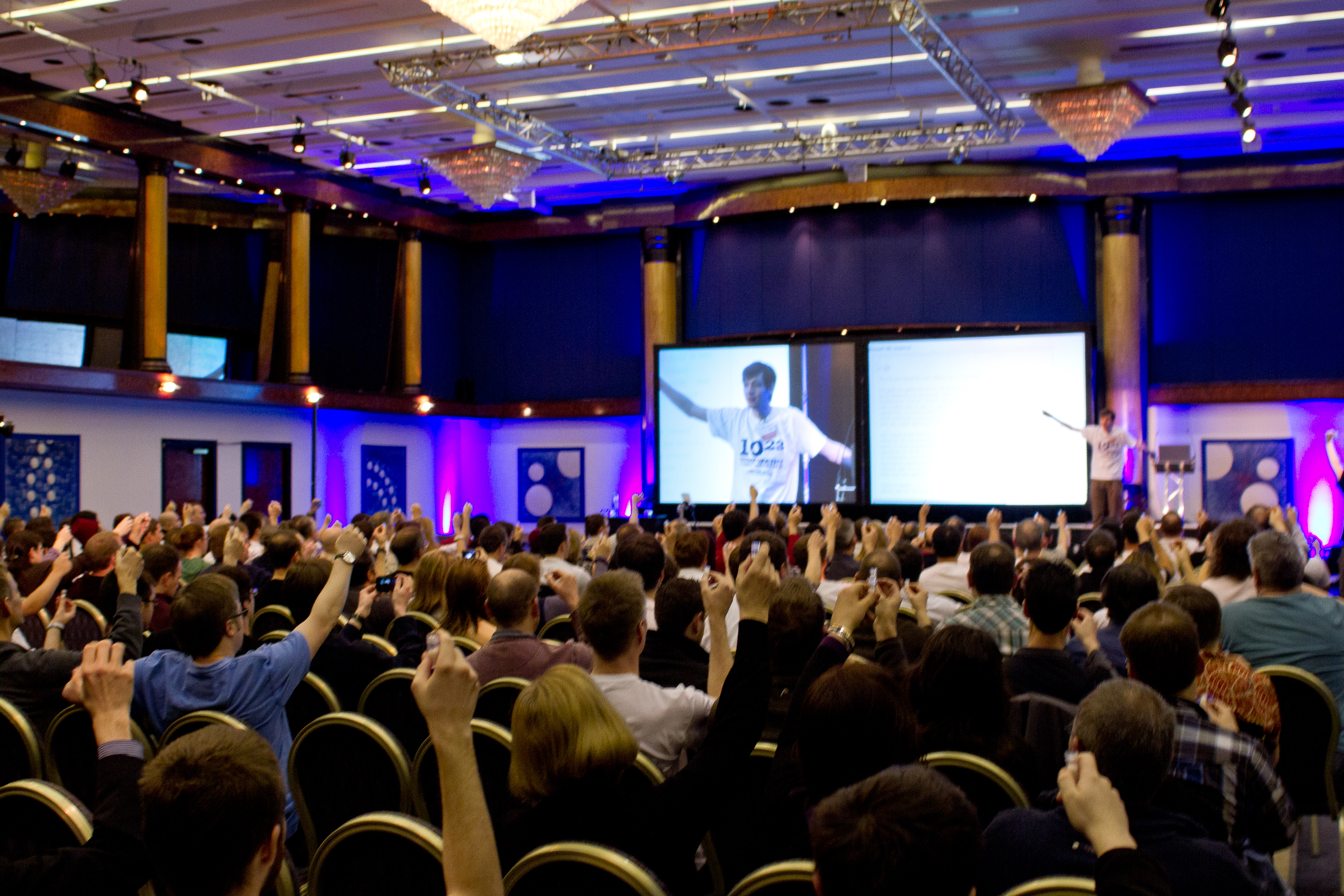
Marshall leads the audience in a homoeopathic overdose at QED 2011.

In January 2010, Marshall co-ordinated the 10:23 Campaign with Mike Hall and Andy Wilson to stage a mass overdose of homoeopathy outside branches of Boots UK in several major cities throughout the country, to publicly demonstrate the inefficacy of homoeopathic products and protest against their sale. In February 2011, he also co-ordinated the global 10:23 Campaign, during which protesters on all continents in 70 cities (at least 30 participants per city) overdosed on homoeopathy. He himself led the overdose on 5 February 2011 at 10:23 during QED 2011, the first annual skeptical conference in Manchester co-organised by the Merseyside Skeptics Society and the Greater Manchester Skeptics Society. In November 2019, Marshall was in Brazil to officially launch the campaign that aims to withdraw financial aid for homeopathy by the country's public health system (SUS).

=== Challenging psychics ===
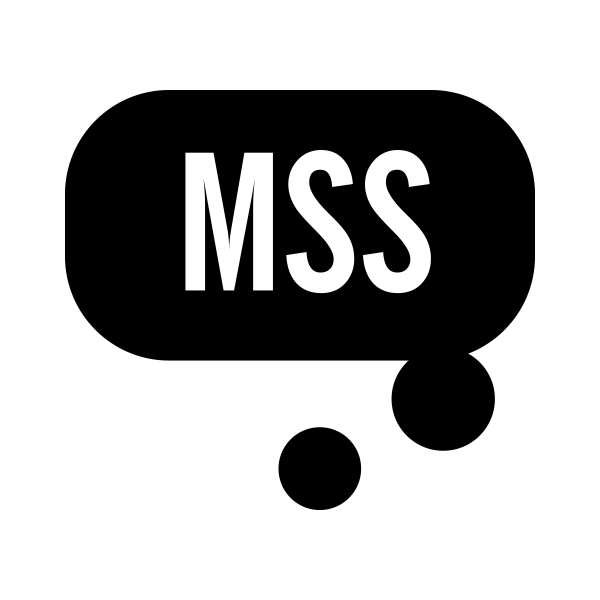
Logo of the Merseyside Skeptics Society.

In October 2011, the Merseyside Skeptics Society (represented by Hall and Marshall), Chris French and Simon Singh set up a "Halloween Challenge" to Sally Morgan to have her alleged psychic abilities tested, to demonstrate that her claims regarding talking to the dead are true, otherwise she might, knowingly or unknowingly, be taking advantage of people's grief. Morgan did not turn up at the press conference, but threatened to sue the skeptics for defamation through her lawyers instead. Nevertheless, the MSS decided to make the Halloween Challenge an annual event and invited any psychic in the UK to take part. When two psychics failed an experiment in October 2012, Marshall remarked: "While the result of our experiment doesn't disprove psychic ability, the fact that our mediums couldn't pass what they felt was a very fair and simple test does seem to suggest claims that these abilities exist aren't based in reality." At the Australian Skeptics National Convention 2014 in Sydney, Marsh lectured about pseudoscience and the channelling of spirits.

=== Engaging with "Believers" ===
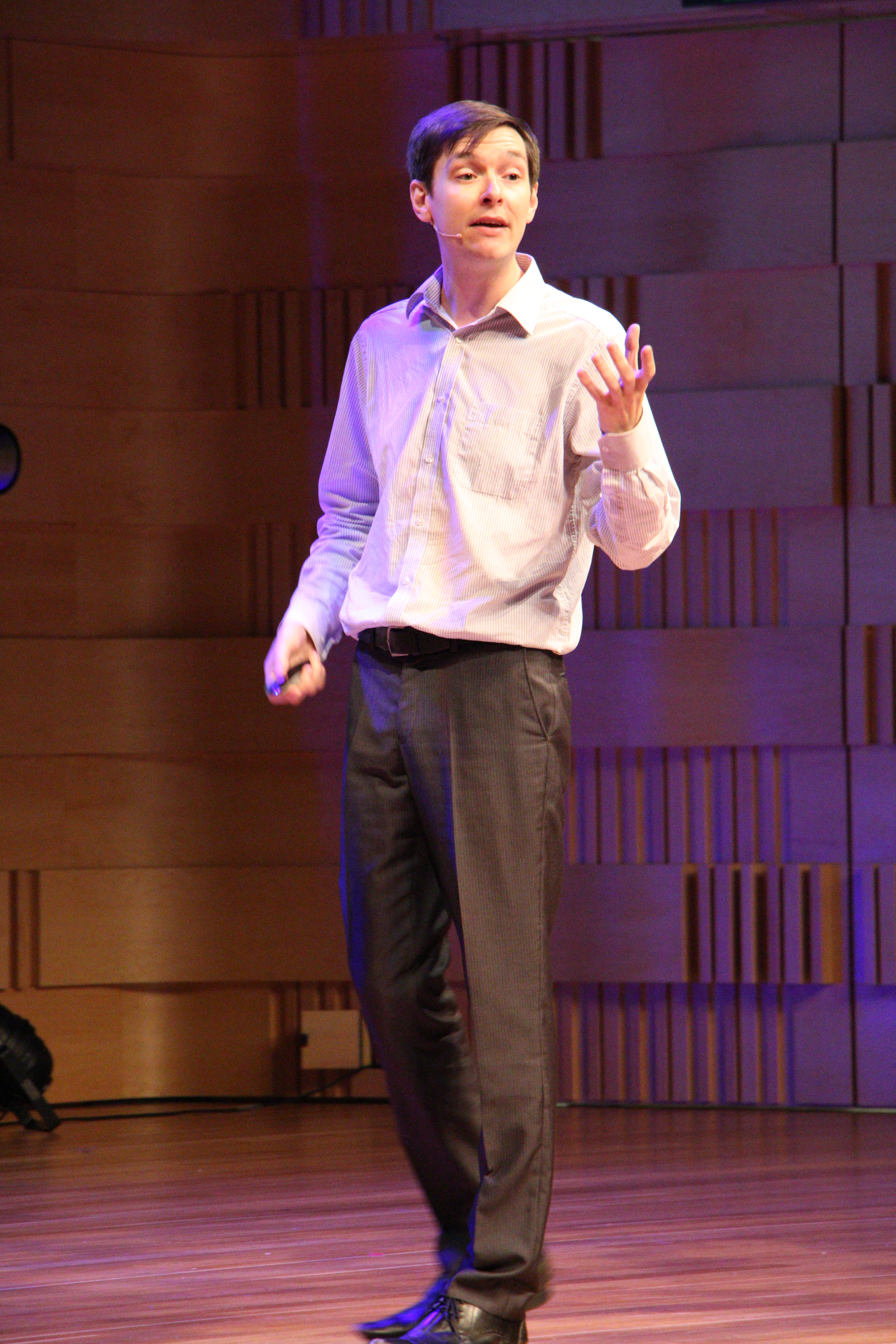
Marsh lecturing at the Australian Skeptics National Convention 2014

In January 2013, Marshall and Hayley Stephens started a podcast called Be Reasonable, where Marshall interviewed people with beliefs outside of science. The aim was to try to understand why people believe in these things without criticising or mocking the person being interviewed. He has stated, "...I try to avoid as much as possible talking over the details of factual claims, where I can't tell in the moment whether a fact is valid or misrepresented, but instead I try to look at the logic built around that particular fact.", " it offers a genuine reflection on how people come to any beliefs—real or false, reasonable or irrational—and how we all build our identity and our world view around our beliefs, to help us make sense of the world". Episodes of the show include interviews with Flat Earther Mark Sargeant; Vicki Monroe, a Psychic and cold case investigator; and Jim Humble, a proponent of Miracle Mineral Supplement solution.

=== Bad PR ===
On SwaK Marshall developed a skill for spotting bad public relations (PR) in the news. This led to holding public lectures about the subject at Skeptics in the Pub meetings throughout the UK, including in Liverpool, and Glasgow, and at skeptical conferences including the 2013 European Skeptics Congress in Stockholm, and at Skeptics on the Fringe 2014. His main contention is that in recent decades, journalists have become increasingly under pressure to write more articles in less time, limiting their time for investigate research and instead tempting or forcing them to pick up press releases from PR companies and, often with little editing, passing them off as real news stories to meet their quota (churnalism). Such press releases are more often than not simply veiled advertisements, disguised as scientific studies or representative social surveys which, if based on any sort of inquiry at all, are usually poorly set up or conducted and prone to bias. Moreover, the headlines under which these "results" get published can be sensationalised and thus even more misleading, and if readers believe such "news" stories to be true, it may have serious negative effects on people's views and actions. When education secretary Michael Gove was criticised by many mainstream newspapers for mistaking a PR stunt by OnePoll for hotel chain Premier Inn, for genuine research on schoolchildren's allegedly lamentable knowledge of British history, Marshall called this "ironic", and rebuked the newspapers by showing how they themselves are largely relying on the same kind of agencies' press releases with "dodgy surveys" for their news stories.

He has also done an interview on BBC Radio 4's More or Less programme, where he discusses various newspaper articles and big headlines that are based on bad PR.

=== Modern belief in a flat Earth ===
Marshall has reported on the modern flat Earth societies and individuals who promote the erroneous idea that the Earth is flat rather than a sphere in order to understand the root of rejecting such uncontroversial facts. Marshall attended the UK's annual Flat Earth UK Convention between 27 and 29 April 2018 and noted that believers in a flat Earth vary widely in their views. While most agree upon a disc-shaped Earth, some are convinced the Earth is diamond shaped. Furthermore, while most believers do not believe in outer space and none believe mankind has ever traveled there, they vary widely in their views of the universe. To Marshall, one of the most telling moments at the convention was the "Flat Earth Addiction" test that was based on a checklist used to determine whether someone is in a cult, without the convention attendees realizing the possibility of themselves being in a cult. Furthermore, Marshall points out that while the belief in a flat Earth might rightly be labelled ridiculous, it is perhaps important to approach believers in a flat Earth as much with understanding as ridicule. Namely, as Marshall states, "it is striking how many people who doubt the global model of the Earth also subscribe to all manner of other beliefs, from Biblical literalism to occultist paranoia, from anti-vaccination to quack cancer cures, from antisemitism to Aryanism. But it is also just as striking how many people whose journey into believing the Earth is flat included traumatic events or personal crises". During QED 2018 Marshall presented his findings from the Flat Earth Convention to the skeptic community, during an interview with Alex Moshakis, of The Observer, before the talk he said "his intention was not to pillory Flat Earth beliefs, but to explain what might turn a person against conventional science, and how their beliefs can become contagious."

== Good Thinking Society ==
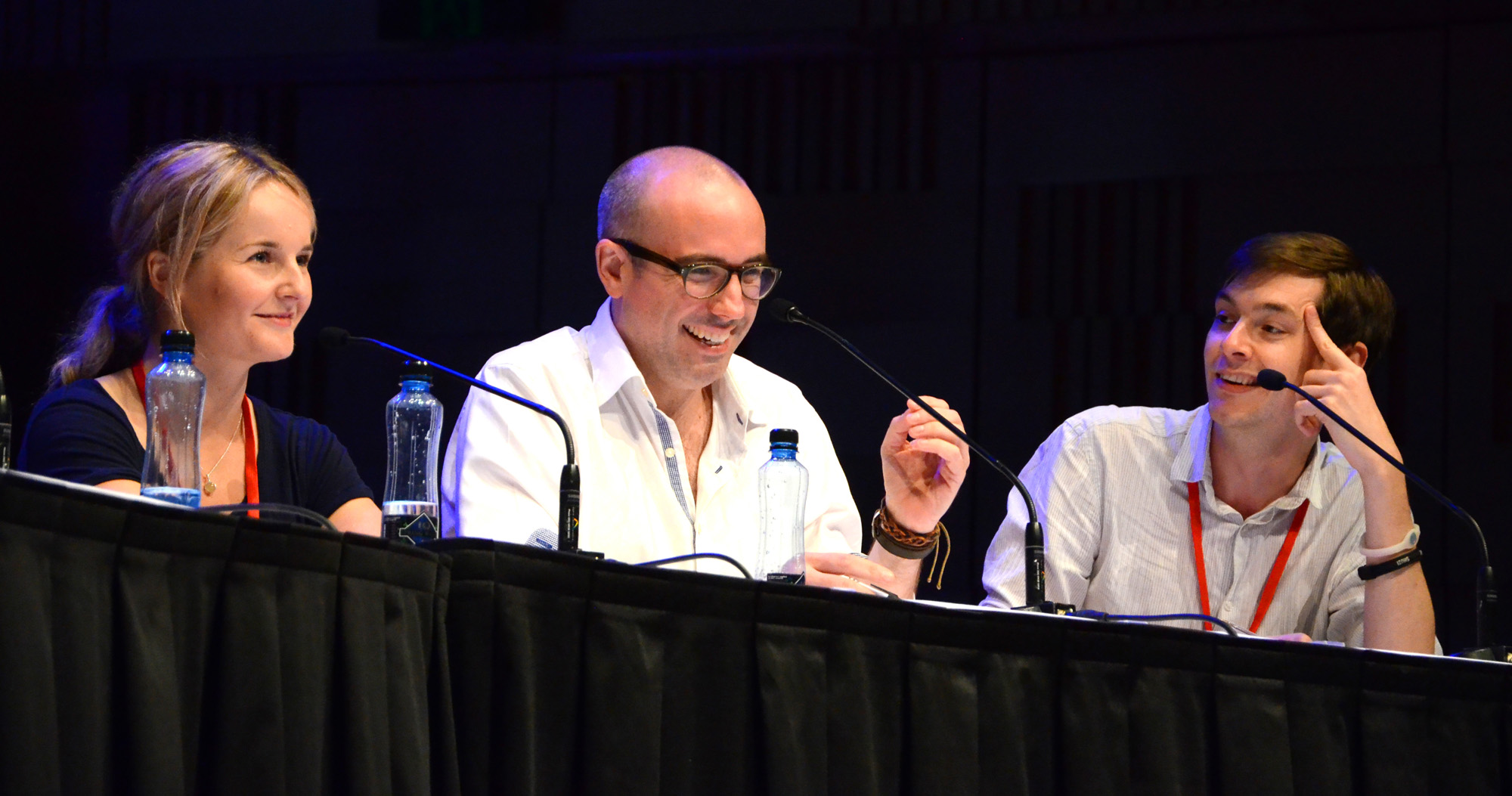
Kirsten Drysdale, Julian Morrow and Marsh discussing consumer protection.

Since March 2014, Marshall has been project director at the Good Thinking Society (GTS). His major focus has been ending the funding of homoeopathy by the National Health Service (NHS), which the GTS considers a costly waste of public money on demonstrably ineffective products; he lectured about this at QED 2015 in Manchester. In June 2015, the Daily Mirror reported that Marshall had investigated the curious case of Freeman's, a NHS-supplying pharmacy that, amongst other products, sold "homeopathic owl", apparently meant for people with sleeping problems or who "pick up the characteristics of [an owl]". Marshall commented, "Around £3–5 million is spent each year [on homeopathic products by the NHS] and it's completely worthless. People are being told that it works when there's no evidence that it does." Also in June, he and the GTS founder Simon Singh called on all remaining homoeopathy-funding CCGs in the UK to follow the example of Liverpool to reconsider their funding policies.

In May 2014, Marshall accused writers at The Daily Telegraph and the Daily Mail of "poor journalism" for uncritically picking up press releases from the British Chiropractic Association and the United Chiropractic Association, based on "flimsy studies" and assertions that were "certainly not supported by any reliable evidence". Recalling the British Chiropractic Association v Singh case, he concluded, "If chiropractors want to be taken seriously, perhaps they should focus on improving the regulation of their industry and conducting rigorous research rather than relying on PR stunts to drum up business."

In May 2015, GTS obtained video footage from the Spirit of Health Congress where, according to Marshall, claims were made about health that "appeared illegal and could cause serious harm": "The dangerous misinformation at the Spirit of Health event is shocking, particularly with regard to serious conditions such as cancer."

In September 2015, Marshall showed how the American televangelist, self-proclaimed prophet and faith healer Peter Popoff – previously exposed by James Randi– was trying to persuade people to send him money on promises of "fabulous extreme fortune" and "miracles". Moreover, at a London gathering, GTS filmed how Popoff supposedly "healed" a woman "who said her body was wracked with pain", but who Marshall and his colleague believed could have been planted in the audience as part of Popoff's team: they saw she was handing out pens and a questionnaire at the start of the event, and quietly left the room soon after the alleged miracle.

In November 2017, the British Homeopathic Association (BHA) filed a suit to overturn NHS England's new guidance which advises GPs not to prescribe homeopathic remedies. In June 2018, BHA lost that case, in a decision characterised by Edzard Ernst as the result of "4 years of excellent work by the Good Thinking Society". Marshall noted that "The last few years have seen almost every part of the NHS end support for homeopathy, and this court decision only goes to further underline the fact that homeopathy warrants no place in modern healthcare."

== Podcasting ==
- Skeptics with a K (Merseyside Skeptics Society): co-host with Mike Hall and Colin Harris, later Alice Howarth (2009–present)
- Be Reasonable (Merseyside Skeptics Society): host (until June 2014 co-host with Hayley M. Stevens) (2013–present)
- The Know Rogan Experience: co-host with Cecil Cicirello (2025–present)
- 2015 ESC Podcast (Good Thinking Society): host (2015)
- Righteous Indignation (independent): co-host with Hayley M. Stevens and Trystan Swale (2009–2012)

He is also a frequent guest on podcasts like Skepticrat, God Awful Movies and The Scathing Atheist.

== Personal life ==
Marsh is a Newcastle United fan.
