= Little Atoms =

Science website, podcast, and magazine

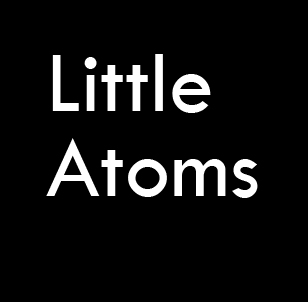
- A Show about Ideas
- Genre: Talk & Culture
- Running time: 30 or 60 minutes
- Country of origin: United Kingdom
- Language(s): English
- Home station: Resonance FM
- Hosted by: Neil Denny; Former: Padraig Reidy; Richard Sanderson; Becky Hogge; Anthony Burn; Stuart Clark; Helen Keen; Christine Ottery; Adam Rutherford; Dan Schreiber; Richard Wilson
- Created by: Neil Denny; Richard Sanderson
- Produced by: Neil Denny
- Recording studio: Resonance FM Studios, Borough High Street, London Bridge
- Original release: 2 September 2005
- Audio format: FM Radio and MP3 Podcast
- Website: www.littleatoms.com
- Podcast: Little Atoms Podcast

Little Atoms is a website, podcast and magazine dedicated to ideas and culture. The radio show broadcast weekly from London on Resonance FM 104.4. It is hosted by Neil Denny. The website is edited by Padraig Reidy. The first edition of Little Atoms magazine launched in November 2015.

== History ==
The radio show was conceived by Neil Denny and Richard Sanderson at a meeting in a pub beer garden in London Bridge on 7 July 2005. The first episode aired on 2 September 2005 and featured a panel of a scientist (Sid Rodrigues), physicist and ex-born again Christian (Norman Hansen) and a folklorist (Scott Wood), along with Neil Denny and Richard Sanderson as the show's hosts. Richard Sanderson was also the producer of two previous incarnations radio shows on Resonance FM, "Sanderson's Alcove", which ran from February 2005 to July 2005 and "Baggage Reclaim" which ran from 2003 to 2005. Little Atoms is regarded as the first "rationalist" radio show in the UK and one of the first podcasts; with only the JREF's "Internet Audio Show", Rick Wood's Audiomartini, Skepticality and The Skeptic's Guide to the Universe preceding it.

Little Atoms was the official podcast of The Skeptic magazine until 2011.

=== Magazine ===
Little Atoms's first print magazine launched in November 2015. It features a mixture of edited podcast interviews and original articles by writers including Jonathan Meades, Fergal Keane, Nick Cohen, Suzanne Moore, and more. It is designed by Wild Bill and Crazy Dave, and features illustrations by Jean Jullien.

=== Awards ===
- Nominated by physics.org web awards in the Best podcast category 2010

=== Reception ===
Little Atoms is frequently cited as one of the UK's top podcasts. In July 2015, Miranda Sawyer, presenter of BBC Radio 4's In Pod We Trust, praised Little Atoms, writing "[Neil] Denny's modesty and well-informed interest enriches Little Atoms, and there are loads of shows to choose from (the As alone include Adam Curtis, Alex Cox and Aleks Krotoski). It has recently expanded into an online magazine, packed with quirky, funny, odd features."

Esquire magazine's Andrew Harrison described the podcast as "engaging, irreverent and unashamedly intellectual", making "Radio 4's Front Row sound like the E! Channel".

Fergal Keane described LittleAtoms.com as "a thoughtful site" with "lots to provoke intelligent discussion".
