= Joyce Harper =

British reproductive scientist

Joyce Harper is a Professor of Reproductive Science at the Institute for Women's Health, University College London where she heads the Reproductive Science and Society group. She is a educator, author, podcaster, academic, researcher and public speaker whose work empowers women to lead happy and healthy lives.

== Biography ==
Joyce Harper has been a leader in the field of fertility and genetics since 1987. As well as being an established scientist with over 260 scientific publications, Harper is a passionate educator of the public and students at all levels, from school children to PhD level. She started her career as a clinical embryologist and joined University College London (UCL) in 1994. She heads the Embryology, IVF and Reproductive Genetics Group at UCL and her past research interests include preimplantation genetic diagnosis (PGD), reproductive genetics, new technology in the subject of in vitro fertilisation (IVF) and embryo selection for IVF. Her recent work is on reproductive health education including menstruation, fertility, and menopause. In 2014, she was made Professor in Reproductive Health at UCL.

She is head of the Institute for Women’s Health (IfWH) Department of Reproductive Health. For 25 years, she was the IfWH Director of Education and set up two Masters programmes, in 1996 and 2009. She has been on the executive committees of the main IVF societies and organisations including ESHRE, PGDIS, ISPD, HFEA and the British Fertility Society. In 2014, with Alpesh Doshi, Harper set up the Embryology and PGD Academy to run training courses in all aspects of laboratory IVF and PGD. In 2015, Harper established a web-based forum to discuss women's health issues called Global Women Connected. In 2021, she published Your Fertile Years with Sheldon Press, a book that took her over thirty years to write. She is currently writing a book sharing the stories of over 50 women over 50 to empower women to lead their best lives. Harper currently publishes a blog and podcast, is the chair of the International Reproductive Health Education Collaboration, and works as a co-founder of InTune (a UK menopause education and support programme) and SwimHer (a research network to examine the effects of cold water swimming on women's health).

In 2025, Harper ran multiple retreats to empower women to lead their best lives and help them find good health and happiness. This included a day-long retreat in Brighton and a week-long retreat in the South of France to explore cold water swimming and yoga.

=== Early life and education ===
Joyce Harper was born in 1963 and was educated in Longfield Infant and Junior School, Whitmore High School and Lowlands Sixth Form College in Harrow. She read Biochemistry at Queen Elizabeth College, University of London from 1981–1984 and obtained a 2:1. She joined the Pharmacology department at King's College London where she completed her PhD in 1987 under the supervision of Professor John Littleton looking at the effects of alcohol on catecholamine release from adrenal chromaffin cells.

== Career ==
=== Research ===
Harper started work in fertility in 1987, initially spending a short time at the Hallam Medical Centre as a clinical embryologist and then moving on to work with Professor Ian Craft at the London Fertility Centre where she became scientific director in charge of the IVF laboratory. She helped thousands of people have a baby. She designed new IVF labs at Cozens House, 112A Harley Street and in Dubai.

In 1992 she joined Alan Handyside and Robert Winston in the preimplantation genetic diagnosis team (PGD) at the Hammersmith Hospital performing clinical biopsies and FISH diagnosis as well as undertaking research into chromosome abnormalities in human embryos. In 1993 she started a joint project with the Hammersmith Hospital and University College London. In 1994 and 1996 she published two papers on the world data of PGD. She was one of the first to report on the high levels of chromosome abnormalities in human preimplantation embryos.

In 1996, with Professor Joy Delhanty and Professor Charles Rodeck, she designed the first of her MSc programmes (Prenatal Genetics and Fetal Medicine), and in 2002, she developed a second MSc programme (Reproductive Science and Women's Health). She directs both programmes and has taught hundreds of students who have gone on to be leaders in the field of reproductive medicine.

For two decades her main research and clinical interest was in PGD. She wrote the first textbook on PGD in 1998, with a second edition in 2001. She was deputy director of UCL Centre for PGD and helped perform hundreds of PGD cycles, testing embryos for specific genetic diseases. She supervised several PhD students. She became a fellow of the Royal College of Pathologists in 2007.

More recently her research interests have expanded to include fertility education, IVF add-ons, femtech and donor conception. She was a co-founder of the fertility education initiative to develop awareness of issues affecting fertility and pregnancy. In 2019, she became co-founder of the International Reproductive Health Education Collaboration who have made many resources for the public, teachers and health professionals to support education of all aspects of reproductive health.

In 2023, she started her podcast, "Why didn't anyone tell me this?" which has been listened to in over 90 countries. The podcast has entered its fourth season.

She is invited to give numerous lectures at international conferences, including plenary and keynote speeches. In February 2017 she talked at the UN, New York for the International Day for Women and Girls in Science.

=== Education ===
Joyce Harper has had a career of education. Since establishing her first MSc in 1996, she has been the IfWH graduate tutor, the faculty graduate tutor and chair of the School of Life and Medical Sciences Education Domain and Director of Education for the Institute for Women’s Health. Harper became a Fellow of the Higher Education Academy in 2007.

Harper started running hands-on workshops on embryo biopsy and the diagnosis used in PGD in 1996. In the UK, Harper has run hands-on workshops annually or biannually since 1996 and also ran numerous workshops overseas. In 2014, Joyce Harper and Alpesh Doshi established the Embryology and PGD Academy to expand the repertoire of workshops to include wider aspects of IVF and PGD. The Academy developed a certificate in clinical embryology to ensure that embryologist globally have adequate training.

Harper has had many senior roles in the main IVF organisations and scientific societies where she has worked on scientific and education projects.

== Institutional roles ==
=== ESHRE ===
Harper was an executive committee board member (2002–2005) and member of the local organising committee for ESHRE 2013 annual meeting in London (2011–2013). She has been involved with the special interest group in Reproductive Genetics being deputy chair (1997–2005) and chair (2011–2013). She was a founding member of the certification for clinical embryologist working group (2006–2009) and a member of the task force on PGS (2007–2011). She was a founding member of the working group looking at Culture Media since 2011 and this work is ongoing. She was a founding member and lead of the joint committee of ESHRE and the European Society of Human Genetics, 2005, 2013, 2016. Her most notable work for ESHRE was being co-founder and deputy chair 1996–2006, chairman 2006–2009 and past chair 2009–2013 of the ESHRE PGD Consortium. She has also been involved in setting up many courses, workshops and conferences for the PGD Consortium. She embedded in the International Reproductive Health Education Collaboration within ESHRE in 2021.

=== International Society of Prenatal Diagnosis ===
Harper was a member of the Board from 2006 to 2012, was involved in organisation of ISPD conferences and also responsible for setting up special interest groups.

=== Preimplantation Genetic Diagnosis International Society ===
Harper was a founding Board Member from 2003 to 2005 which included chairing the local organising committee for the PGDIS London 2005 conference.

=== British Fertility Society ===
Harper has been an executive Committee member since 2011. She is deputy lead of the Fertility Education Initiative which was established in 2015 to improve fertility education in the UK.

=== Human Fertilisation and Embryology Authority ===
Harper has had many roles in the HFEA, including chair of the Horizon Scanning Group (since 2007), advisor to the Scientific and Clinical Advances Advisory Committee

(2009–present), person Responsible for UCL research licence, nominal Licensee for Centre for Reproductive and Genetic Health treatment licence, consultant for HFEA consultation document on PGD, member of HFEA working group on Embryo Biopsy and a HFEA Inspector for embryo biopsy.

=== Public engagement ===
In 2017, she organised the first Purple Tent events, to bring women together to celebrate being a woman.

Annually the Institute for Women's Health holds a week of activities for International Women's Day and Harper has been involved every year. She has participated in a debate on social egg freezing, debate on reproductive genetics and given two UCL lunch hour lectures on International Women's Day.

Harper visits a number of schools and gives lectures on careers in science, applying to university, IVF, genetics and all aspects of women's health from the menstrual cycle to the menopause.

She also gives public talks and discussion groups on all aspects of women's health, including Wellbeing Over 40 and Career and Motherhood. She runs corporate workshops for women.

== Art projects ==
The Empty Project: Louse Wilson. Louise makes visual and multi-sensory site-specific performances, walks and installations that seek to articulate, reflect upon and transform significant life-events. Harper was involved in Warnscale, a landmark walking performance, reflecting on In/Fertility and childlessness. Warnscale is an area of fells to the south of Buttermere Lake. Walking art book published in May 2015.

25 Years of Techno Art by Abdul Haqq. Featured in this book. Published 2014. A third earth book.

Appeared in album notes for Underground resistance – Interstellar fugitives.

Designing sex: Adam Peacock. Adam is artist in residence at the London School of Fashion. Harper participated in a discussion event. The project is ongoing.

== Press and media ==
Joyce Harper is often quoted in the press and media.

== Personal life ==
Joyce Harper is a single mother of three sons. She lives near Cambridge, UK.

== Publications ==
A full list can be found at www.ucl.ac.uk/joyceharper/publications/#tabs-3.
