= The Skeptic (British magazine) =

British magazine

- The Skeptic cover for Volume 22, Issue 2, 2009: Parapsychology: Dead or Alive?
- Editor-in-Chief: Michael Marshall
- Categories: Science magazine
- Frequency: Quarterly
- Publisher: Merseyside Skeptics Society
- Founded: 1987
- Country: United Kingdom
- Language: English
- Website: www.skeptic.org.uk
- ISSN: 0959-5228

The Skeptic is a British non-profit skepticism magazine. It describes itself as "the UK's longest running and foremost sceptical magazine, which examines science, skepticism, secularism, critical thinking and claims of the paranormal." It is also known to take a critical stance towards alternative medicine.

== History, format and structure ==
The Skeptic was founded in 1987 by Wendy M. Grossman, and subsequently edited from 1988 to 1998 by Toby Howard and Steve Donnelly. From 1998 to 2011 it was edited by Chris French, and from 2011 to 2020 by Deborah Hyde.

In the end of 1986, Grossman visited the headquarters of Committee for Skeptical Inquiry (still named Committee for the Scientific Investigation of Claims of the Paranormal, CSICOP) in Buffalo, New York, US. She had crossed paths with the skeptical movement more than five years earlier, after attending a lecture by stage magician James Randi and reading Martin Gardner's Science: Good, Bad, and Bogus. Ever since this first contact, she became a reader of CSI's publication, Skeptical Inquirer. On that day at CSI, the executive director, Mark Plummer, suggested her to start a newsletter.

Even after stepping aside from The Skeptic's editorial board, Grossman has expressed a satisfaction for all the magazine's accomplishments over the years and credits it to the sum of the work of many individuals in a common goal: "The thing I am actually proudest of in fact is not my own contribution in starting The Skeptic. What I am proud of is that it has attracted so many persistent supporters who have worked far harder to keep it alive and make it prosper than I ever did myself: Chris French and his Goldsmiths students; Hilary Evans, who has contributed both illustrations from the Mary Evans Picture Library and his own writing for so many years; cartoonists Donald Rooum and Ted Pearce; Toby Howard and Steve Donnelly, who edited the magazine for eight years and did the brutally hard work of growing the subscriber base; Peter O’Hara, my partner in getting the magazine out when it was photocopied and posted by hand; Michael Hutchinson; and the many, many contributors of articles and other features to the magazine who are too numerous to list. It is not a great thing to start a newsletter, but it is a great thing 20 years later to see it still alive and not dependent on its founder for its survival. That is really the key, because for something to have real, longterm impact it must be a community effort".

Since 2020, the magazine has been edited by Michael Marshall and Alice Howarth, and published by the Merseyside Skeptics Society. Regular columnists and authors contributing articles to the publication have included Mark Duwe, Chris French, Wendy M Grossman, Mike Heap, Paul Taylor and Mark Williams. Neil Davies routinely provides artwork for the cover. Centerfold pieces have been contributed by Crispian Jago. Other artwork is routinely contributed by Donald Rooum, Tim Pearce, Andrew Endersby and Barbara Griffiths.

The magazine is also supported by an Editorial Advisory Board which as of 2015 included, among others: James Alcock, Susan Blackmore, Derren Brown, David Colquhoun, Brian Cox, and Richard Dawkins.

== Podcast ==
In 2008, an independent, rationalist talk show airing on London's Resonance FM called Little Atoms became The Official Podcast of The Skeptic Magazine. New episodes of the show are released on an semi-weekly basis. The show has been produced by Neil Denny, Padraig Reidy, Anthony Burn and Richard Sanderson since September 2005.

Since February 2025, The Skeptic Podcast has released fortnightly episodes, featuring selected articles from back issues of The Skeptic magazine, narrated by members of the Merseyside Skeptics Society, including the hosts of Skeptics with a K and Inkredulous.

== Awards ==
=== Ockham Awards ===
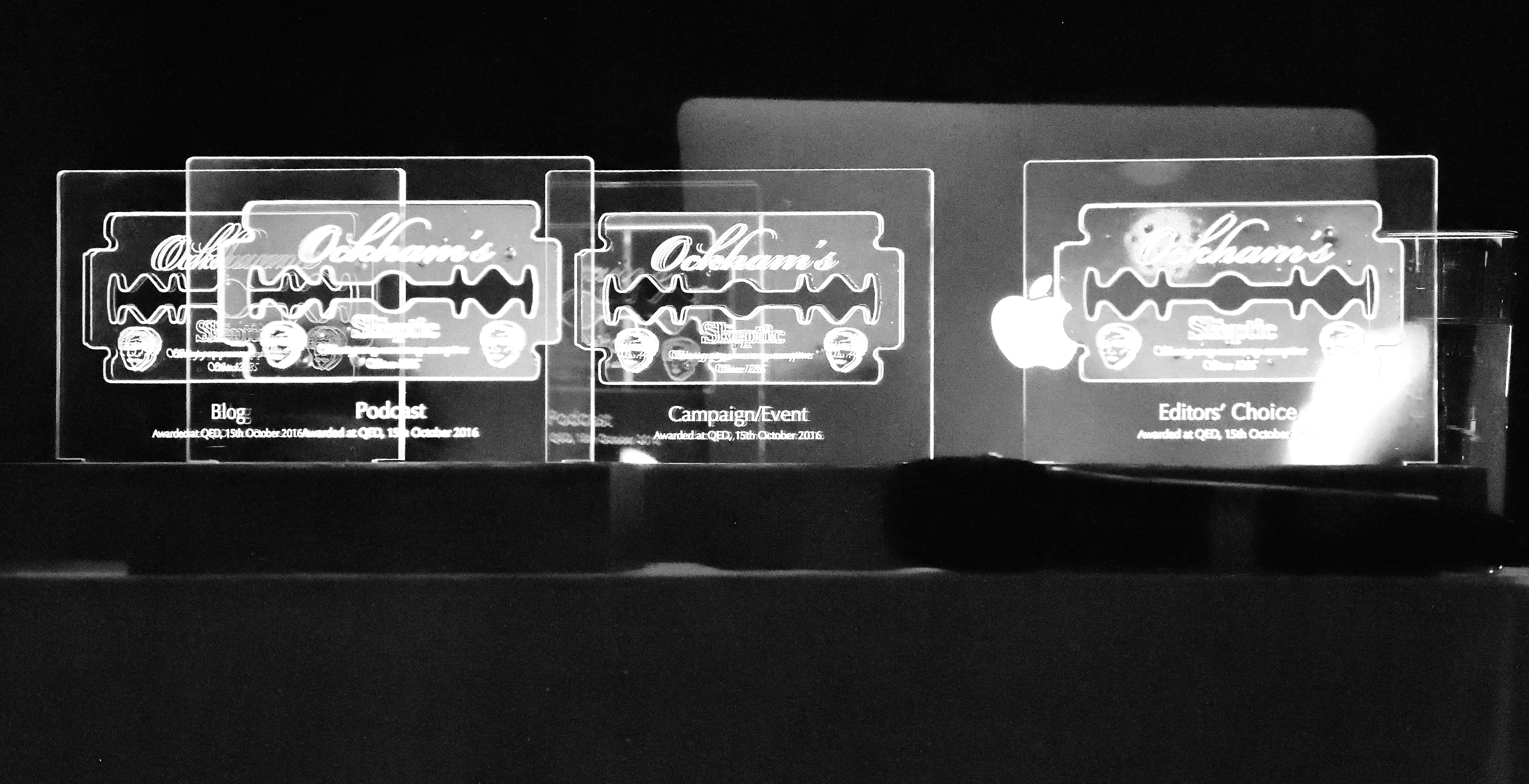
The 2016 Ockham Awards

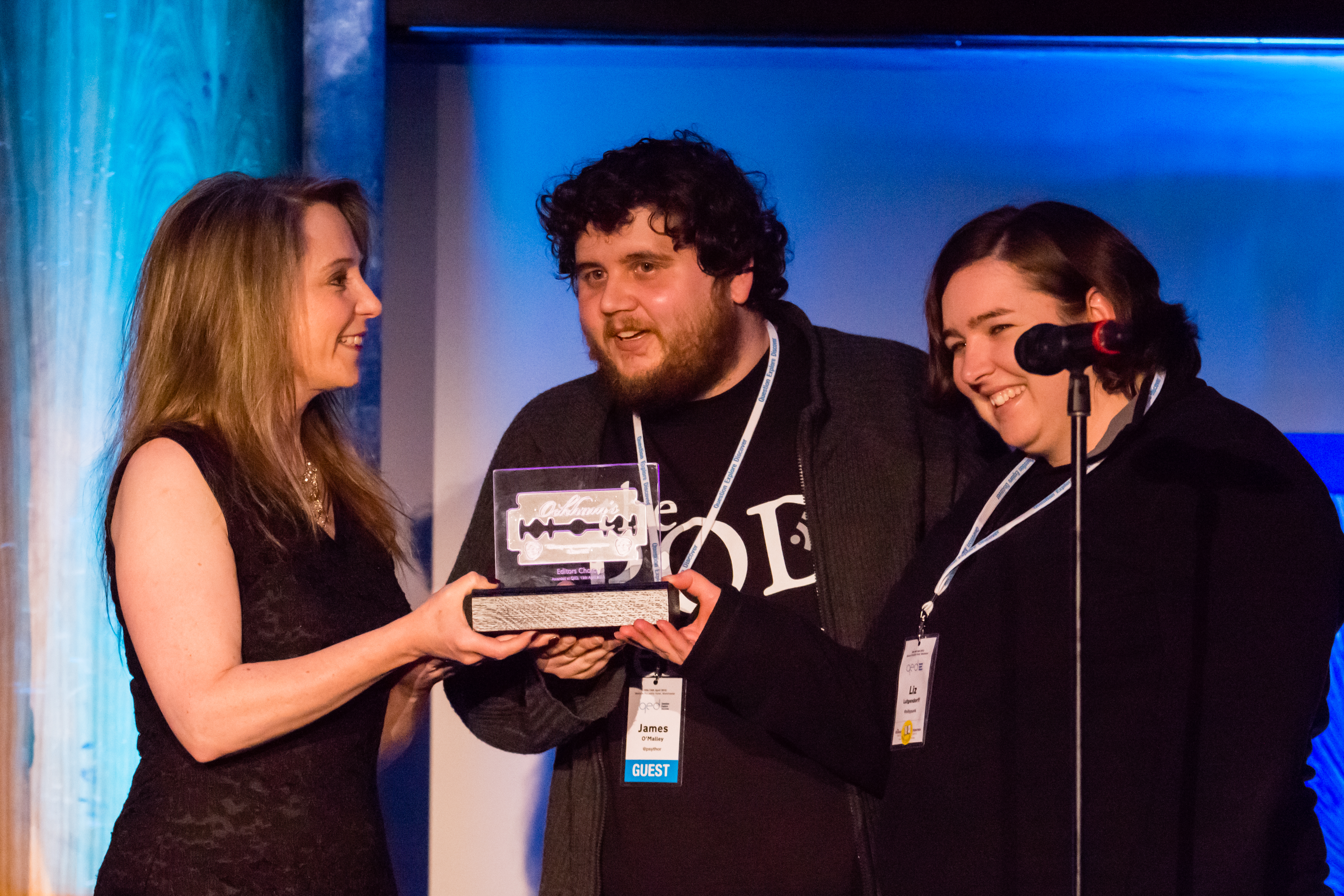
Deborah Hyde grants the 2013 Editor's Choice Ockham to The Pod Delusion team.

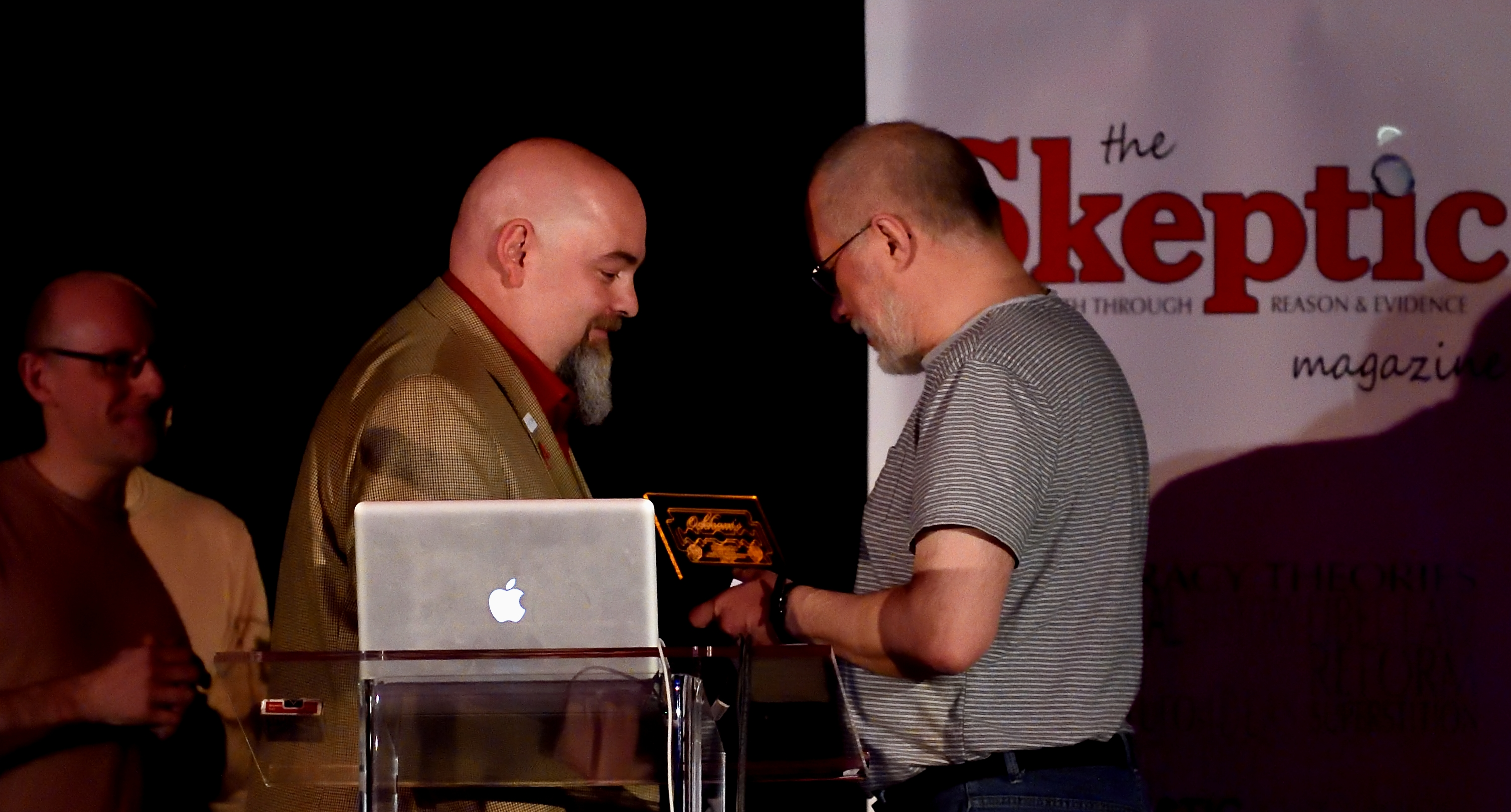
Matt Dillahunty presents Alan Henness the 2015 Event / Campaign Award for "Stop the Saatchi Bill".

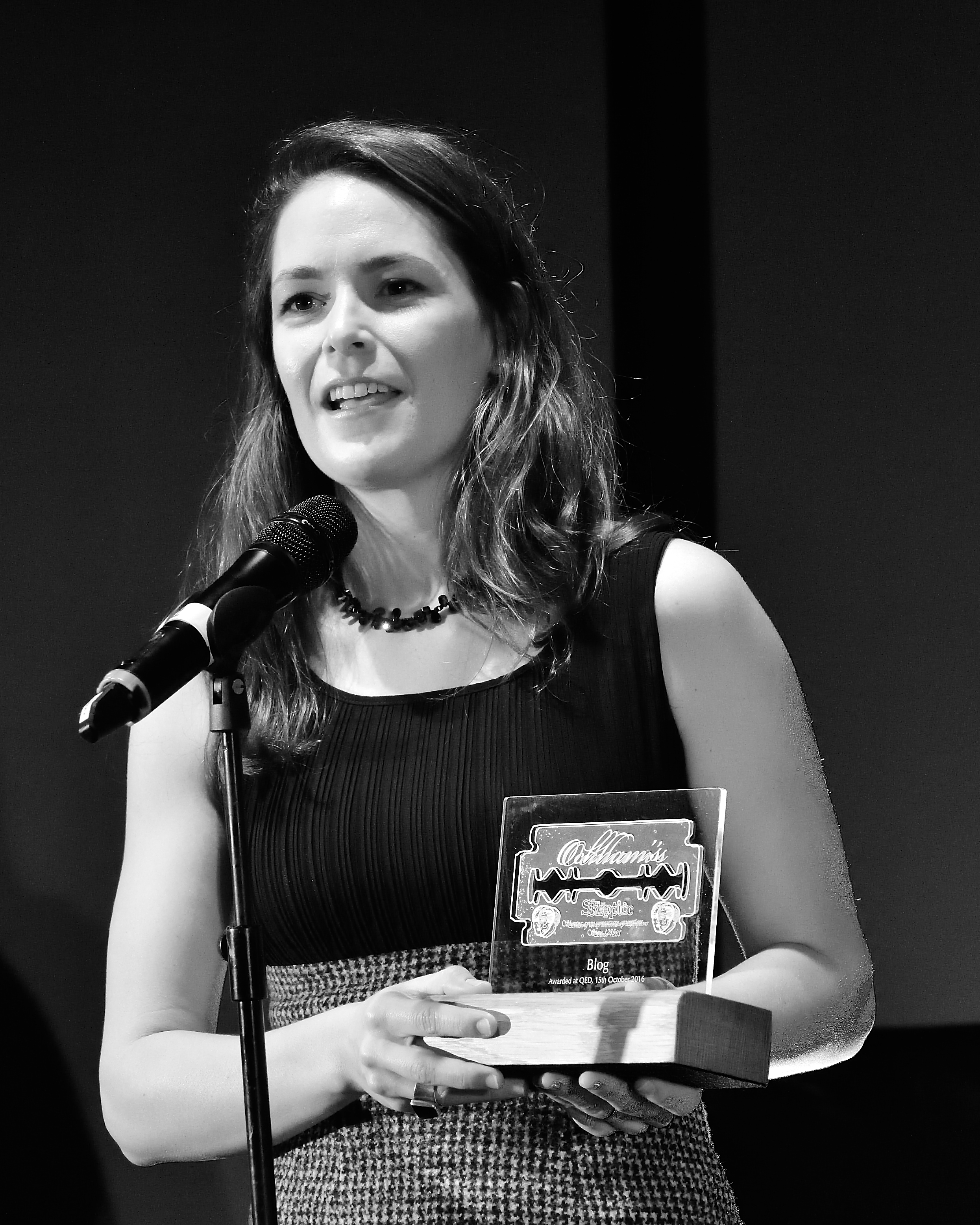
Britt Hermes thanks the skeptical community for the 2016 Blog Ockham.

The Skeptic magazine annually awards the Ockham Awards, or in more simple terms the Ockhams, at QED. This occurred for the first time in 2012. The Ockhams were introduced by editor-in-chief Deborah Hyde to "recognise the effort and time that have gone into the community’s favourite skeptical blogs, skeptical podcasts, skeptical campaigns and outstanding contributors to the skeptical cause." The winners are selected by a panel, from submissions by the skeptical community. "The Editors' Choice Award" is separate from the main Ockham categories, chosen by the current and past editors-in-chief of The Skeptic, Chris French, Wendy Grossman and Deborah Hyde. The ironic award 'for the most audacious pseudo-science', "The Rusty Razor" (introduced in 2017), is determined entirely by public vote.

The name refers to Ockham's razor, formulated by English philosopher William of Ockham (c. 1285–1347). The trophies, designed by Neil Davies and Karl Derrick, carry the upper text "Ockham's" and the lower text "The Skeptic. Shaving away unnecessary assumptions since 1285." Between the texts, there is an image of a double-edged safety razorblade, and both lower corners feature an image of William of Ockham's face.

=== Rusty Razor Award ===
The award is given to worst promoters of pseudoscience in the year. Recipients include:

- 2017 Goop, coffee enema device
- 2018 Andrew Wakefield, anti-vaxxer
- 2020 Didier Raoult
- 2021 Michael Yeadon, anti-vaxxer
- 2022 The Global Warming Policy Foundation, climate change denial
- 2023 Aseem Malhotra, COVID-19 vaccine critic
- 2024 Elon Musk, for his handling of Twitter. Steven Bartlett came in second place.
- 2025 Reform UK, for spreading pseudoscientific misinformation.
- 2026 Toby Young, Baron Young of Acton, and his publication the Daily Sceptic for misinformation including vaccine- and climate-change denial.

== See also ==
- Scientific skepticism
- Skeptical Inquirer
- Skeptic (U.S. magazine)
- The Freethinker journal
- The Skeptic's Dictionary
