= Natasha Demkina =

Russian woman

- Ната́лья Никола́евна Дёмкина
- Born: Natalya Nikolayevna Demkina; 1987 (age 38–39); Saransk, Mordovia, Russia, USSR
- Citizenship: Russia
- Occupation: Alleged medical marvel

Natalya "Natasha" Nikolayevna Demkina (Russian: Ната́лья Никола́евна Дёмкина, romanized: Natalya Nikolayevna Dyomkina; born 1987) is a Russian woman who claimed to possess a special vision that allows her to look inside human bodies and see organs and tissues, and thereby make medical diagnoses. Since the age of ten, she has performed readings in Russia. She is widely known by the childhood variant of her given name, Natasha. In 2004 she appeared on television shows in the United Kingdom, on the Discovery Channel and in Japan. Since 2004 Demkina has been a full-time student of the Semashko State Stomatological University, Moscow. Since January 2006, Demkina has worked for the Center of Special Diagnostics of Natalya Demkina (TSSD), whose stated purpose is to diagnose and treat illness in cooperation with "experts possessing unusual abilities, folk healers and professionals of traditional medicine". Many experts are skeptical of her claims.

== History ==
According to her mother, Tatyana Vladimovna, Demkina was a fast learner, but was otherwise a normal child until she was ten years old, at which time her ability began to manifest itself.

"I was at home with my mother and suddenly I had a vision. I could see inside my mother's body and I started telling her about the organs I could see. Now, I have to switch from my regular vision to what I call medical vision. For a fraction of a second, I see a colorful picture inside the person and then I start to analyze it." says Demkina

After describing her mother's internal organs to her, Demkina's story began to spread by word of mouth among the local population and people began gathering outside her door seeking medical consultations. Her story was picked up by a local newspaper in spring 2003 and a local television station followed suit in November that year. This led to interest from a British tabloid newspaper which invited her to give demonstrations in London, as well as further invitations from groups in New York and Tokyo.

After stories about Demkina had begun to spread, doctors at a children's hospital in her home town asked her to perform a number of tasks to see if her abilities were genuine. Demkina is reported to have drawn a picture of what she saw inside a doctor's stomach, marking where he had an ulcer. She also disagreed with the diagnosis of a cancer patient, saying all she could see was a small cyst.

=== United Kingdom ===
In January 2004, British tabloid newspaper The Sun brought Demkina to England. She gave a number of demonstrations and her diagnoses were then compared to professional medical diagnosis. A Discovery Channel documentary on Demkina mentions reports of Demkina having successfully identified all the fractures and metal pins in a woman who had recently been a victim in a car crash. The Guardian reported that she impressed the host of daytime television program This Morning by spotting that she had a sore ankle during an interview.

Initially, Demkina's demonstrations were well received. However, after she had left the United Kingdom, it emerged that she had made errors among her diagnoses. In one incident she told television-physician Chris Steele that he was suffering from a number of medical conditions, including kidney stones, an ailment of the gall bladder, and an enlarged liver and pancreas. Later medical evaluation determined that he was in good health and was not suffering from any of the ailments she had identified.

=== New York City ===
In May 2004 she was brought to New York City by the Discovery Channel to appear on a documentary titled The Girl with X-Ray Eyes, and to be tested by skeptical researchers from the Committee for Skeptical Inquiry (CSI) under partially controlled conditions.

As a demonstration for the documentary, Demkina was shown giving diagnoses to people who had previously given descriptions of their specific medical conditions. Most of the people given these readings felt that Demkina had accurately identified their conditions. The researchers, however, were not similarly impressed. CSI researcher Richard Wiseman said, "When I saw her do her usual readings, I couldn't believe the discrepancy between what I was hearing and how impressed the individuals were... I thought they were going to walk away saying it was embarrassing, but time and again, they said it was amazing. Before each reading, I asked the people what was the main medical problem and Natasha never got one of those right". Wiseman compared the belief of people in Demkina's diagnoses to the belief of people in fortune tellers, and said that people focus only on those portions of Demkina's comments that they believe.

Then CSI researchers Ray Hyman, Richard Wiseman, and Andrew Skolnick conducted their test of Demkina. In the test, Demkina was asked to correctly match six specified anatomical anomalies to seven volunteer subjects. The cases in question included six specified anatomical anomalies resulting from surgery and one "normal" control subject. The researchers said that, because of limitation in time and resources, the preliminary test was designed to look only for a strongly demonstrated ability. The researchers explained that while evidence of a weak or erratic ability may be of theoretical interest, it would be useless for providing medical diagnoses. In addition, the researchers said that the influence of non-paranormal observations could not be ruled out under the lax conditions of the test. Demkina and the investigators had agreed that in order to warrant further testing, she needed to correctly match at least five of the seven conditions. In the 4-hour-long test, Demkina correctly matched conditions to four volunteers, including the control subject. The researchers concluded that she had not demonstrated evidence of an ability that would warrant their further study.

Subsequently, the design and conclusions of this experiment were subjects of considerable dispute between Demkina's supporters and those of the investigators.

=== Demkina's criticism ===
After completing experiments in New York, Demkina made several complaints in regard to the conditions under which they were conducted, and about the way in which she and her diagnoses were treated. She argued that she had required more time to see a metal plate in one subject's skull, that surgical scars interfered with her ability to see the resected esophagus in another, and that she had been presented with two study subjects who had undergone abdominal procedures, but that she had only one abdominal condition on her list of potential diagnoses, leaving her confused as to which one matched the listed condition.

Later, she also complained that she could not see that one volunteer had had their appendix removed because she said appendixes sometimes grow back. She said she was not able to compare her own diagnosis to an independent medical diagnosis after key experiments had been conducted, preventing her from being able to see if she was diagnosing genuine conditions that were unknown to those conducting the experiments, and which were thus being listed against her in the overall results despite them being valid (due to this complaint, all volunteers in subsequent experiments, in Tokyo, were required to bring medical certificates with them before diagnosis).

In response to these complaints, the research team stated that Demkina should have been able to find the plate without extrasensory abilities, because its outline could be seen beneath the subject's scalp, and questioned why the presence of scar tissue in a subject's throat had not alerted her to them having an esophageal condition. Additionally, they noted that it remains clinically impossible for an appendix to spontaneously regrow.

==== Brian Josephson's criticism ====
In a self-published commentary regarding the New York testing performed by the Committee for the Scientific Investigation of Claims of the Paranormal (CSICOP) and CSMMH, Nobel prize winning physicist and parapsychology supporter Brian Josephson criticized the test and evaluation methods used by Hyman and questioned the researchers' motives, leveling the accusation that the experiment had the appearance of being "some kind of plot to discredit the teenage claimed psychic".

Stating that the results should have been deemed "inconclusive", Josephson argued the odds of Demkina achieving four matches out of seven by chance alone were 1 in 50, or 2% – making her success rate a statistically significant result. He also argued that Hyman used a Bayes factor that was statistically unjustifiable because it greatly increased the risk of the experiment falsely recording a moderate correlation as being no correlation.

Hyman responded that the high benchmark used in the testing was necessary due to the higher levels of statistical significance which he says is necessary when testing paranormal claims, and that a high Bayes factor was necessary to compensate for the fact that "Demkina was not blindly guessing", but instead "had a great number of normal sensory clues that could have helped increase her number of correct matches".

Bayes factors are used to compensate for variables that cannot be calculated through conventional statistics; in this case, the variable created by the visual clues that Demkina might gather from observing a subject. The Bayes factors used by Hyman were calculated by professors Persi Diaconis and Susan Holmes of the Department of Statistics at Stanford University.

=== Tokyo ===
After visiting New York, Demkina traveled to Tokyo Electrical University (東京電機大学) in Japan, at the invitation of Professor Yoshio Machi, who studies claims of unusual human abilities. The Tokyo test was reviewed by three Japanese experts: the occult critic Hajime Yuumu, the psychologist Hiroyuki Ishii, and the Tondemo-bon Society skeptic Hiroshi Yamamoto. The results of Dr. Machi's tests and a panel discussion by the three critics aired on Fuji Television on 12 May 2005. Demkina refused to participate in any test where the patients stood behind a cloth screen, despite the cloth being see-through with x-rays in the same way skin is.
