= Committee for Skeptical Inquiry =

Organization focusing on scientific skepticism

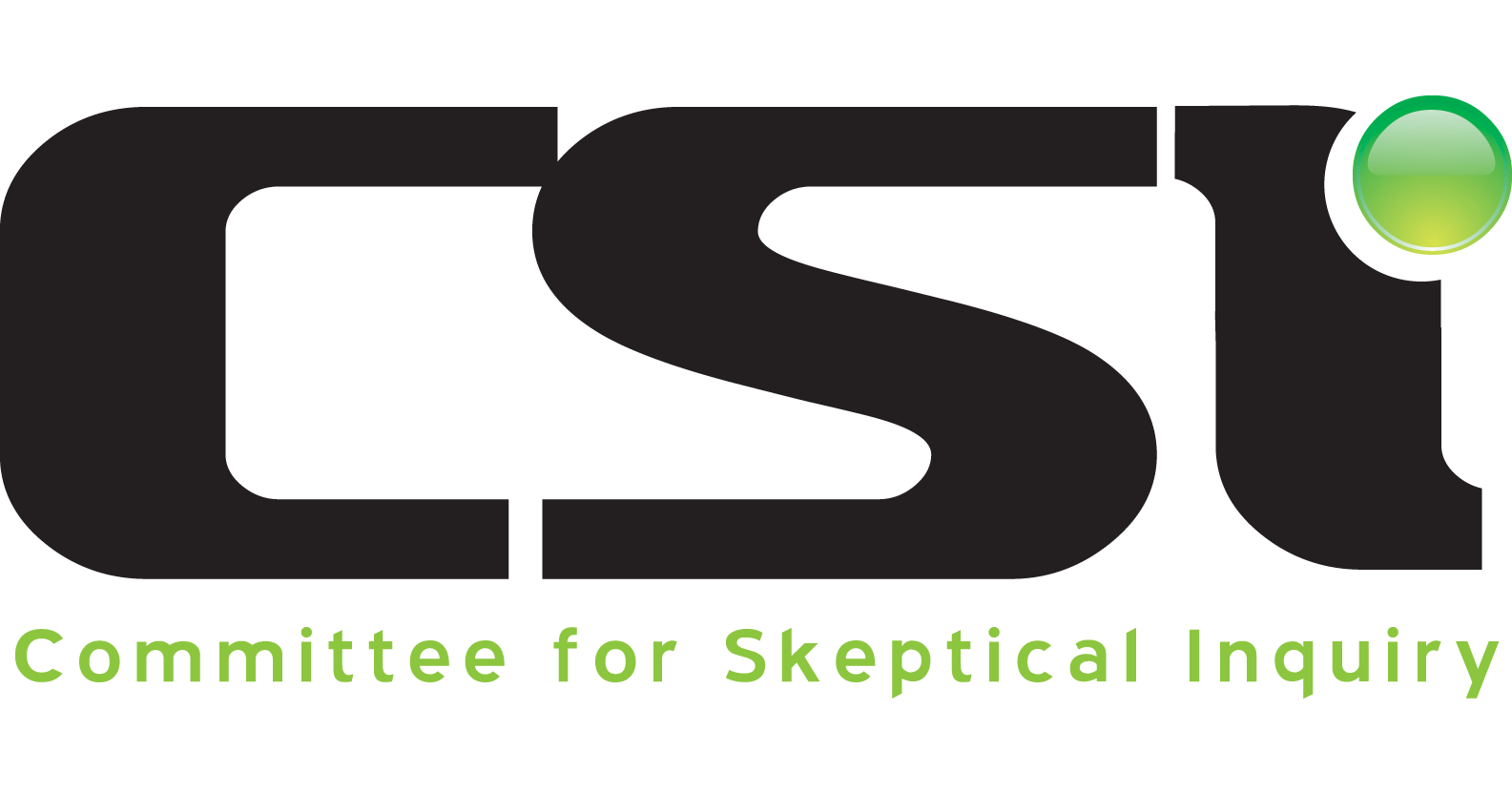
- Abbreviation: CSI
- Formation: 1976; 50 years ago
- Type: Nonprofit organization (since 1976) and part of the Center for Inquiry (since 2015)
- Headquarters: Amherst, New York, United States
- Region served: Worldwide
- Executive director: Stephen Hupp
- Website: skepticalinquirer.org
- Formerly called: Committee for the Scientific Investigation of Claims of the Paranormal

The Committee for Skeptical Inquiry (CSI), formerly known as the Committee for the Scientific Investigation of Claims of the Paranormal (CSICOP), is a program within the U.S. non-profit organization Center for Inquiry (CFI), which seeks to "promote scientific inquiry, critical investigation, and the use of reason in examining controversial and extraordinary claims." Paul Kurtz proposed the establishment of CSICOP in 1976 as an independent non-profit organization (before merging with CFI as one of its programs in 2015), to counter what he regarded as an uncritical acceptance of, and support for, paranormal claims by both the media and society in general. Its philosophical position is one of scientific skepticism. CSI's fellows have included notable scientists, Nobel laureates, philosophers, psychologists, educators, and authors. It is headquartered in Amherst, New York.

== History ==
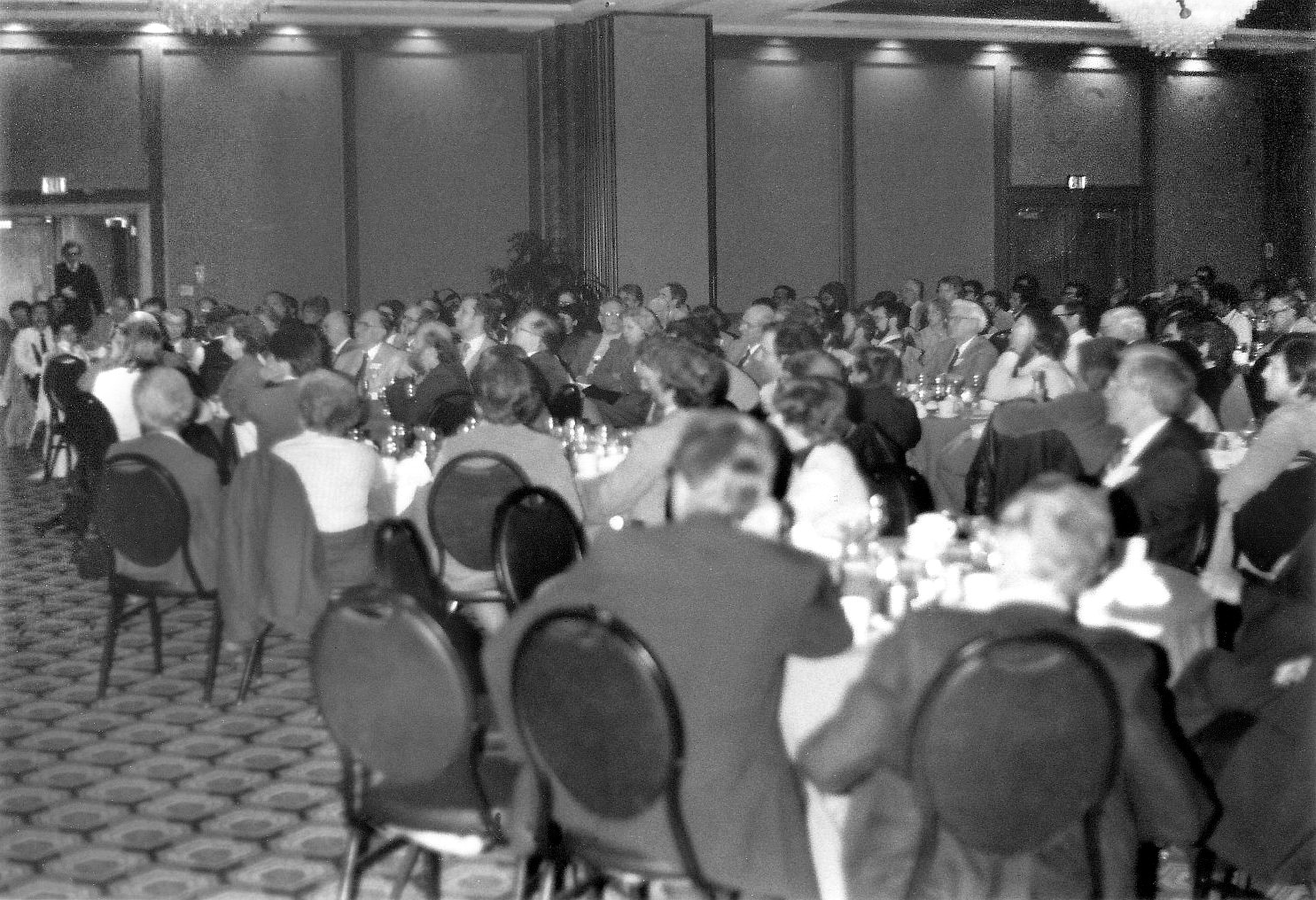
Banquet at the 1983 CSICOP Conference in Buffalo, New York

The committee was officially launched on April 30, 1976, and was co-chaired by Paul Kurtz and Marcello Truzzi. In the early 1970s, scientific skeptics were concerned that interest in the paranormal was on the rise in the United States, part of a growing tide of irrationalism. In 1975, Kurtz, a secular humanist, initiated a statement, "Objections to Astrology", which was co-written with Bart Bok and Lawrence E. Jerome, and endorsed by 186 scientists, including 19 Nobel laureates. The statement was published in the American Humanist Association (AHA)'s newsletter The Humanist, of which Kurtz was then editor. According to Kurtz, the statement was sent to every newspaper in the United States and Canada. It received a positive reaction, which encouraged Kurtz to invite skeptical researchers to a 1976 conference with the aim of establishing a new organization to critically examine a wide range of paranormal claims. Attendees included Martin Gardner, Ray Hyman, James Randi, and Marcello Truzzi, all members of the Resources for the Scientific Evaluation of the Paranormal (RSEP), a fledgling group with objectives similar to those CSI would subsequently adopt.

RSEP disbanded and its members, along with Carl Sagan, Isaac Asimov, B.F. Skinner, and Philip J. Klass, then joined Kurtz, Randi, Gardner, and Hyman to formally found the Committee for Scientific Investigation of Claims of the Paranormal (CSICOP). Kurtz, Randi, Gardner, and Hyman took seats on the executive board. CSICOP was officially launched at a specially convened conference of the AHA on April 30 and May 1, 1976.

According to the published correspondence between Gardner and Truzzi, disagreements over what CSICOP should show how volatile the beginnings of the organization were. Truzzi accused CSICOP of "act[ing] more like lawyers" taking on a position of dismissal before evaluating the claims, saying that CSICOP took a "debunking stance". Gardner, on the other hand, "opposed 'believers' in the paranormal becoming CSICOP members", which Truzzi supported. Gardner felt that Truzzi "conferred too much respectability to nonsense".

CSICOP was funded in part with donations and sales of their magazine, Skeptical Inquirer.

== Mission statement ==
The formal mission statement, approved in 2006 and still current, states:

The Committee for Skeptical Inquiry promotes science and scientific inquiry, critical thinking, science education, and the use of reason in examining important issues. It encourages the critical investigation of controversial or extraordinary claims from a responsible, scientific point of view and disseminates factual information about the results of such inquiries to the scientific community, the media, and the public.

A shorter version of the mission statement appears in every issue: "... promotes scientific inquiry, critical investigation, and the use of reason in examining controversial and extraordinary claims." A previous mission statement referred to "investigation of paranormal and fringe-science claims", but the 2006 change recognized and ratified a wider purview for CSI and its magazine, Skeptical Inquirer, that includes "new science related issues at the intersection of science and public concerns, while not ignoring [their] core topics". A history of the first two decades is available in The Encyclopedia of the Paranormal published in 1998 by S.I. editor Kendrick Frazier. In 2018, Frazier reemphasized the importance of the committee's work by saying that "[w]e need independent, evidence-based, science-based critical investigation and inquiry now more than perhaps at any other time in our history."

=== Name ===
Paul Kurtz was inspired by the 1949 Belgian organization Comité Para, whose full name was Comité Belge pour l'Investigation Scientifique des Phénomènes Réputés Paranormaux ("Belgian Committee for Scientific Investigation of Purported Paranormal Phenomena"). In 1976, the proposed name was "Committee for the Scientific Investigation of Claims of the Paranormal and Other Phenomena" which was shortened to "Committee for the Scientific Investigation of Claims of the Paranormal". The initial acronym, "CSICP" was difficult to pronounce and so was changed to "CSICOP". According to James Alcock, it was never intended to be "Psi Cop", a nickname that some of the group's detractors adopted.

In November 2006, CSICOP further shortened its name to "Committee for Skeptical Inquiry" (CSI), pronounced C-S-I. The reasons for the change were to create a name that was shorter, more "media-friendly", to remove "paranormal" from the name, and to reflect more accurately the actual scope of the organization with its broader focus on critical thinking, science, and rationality in general, and because "it includes the root words of our magazine's title, the Skeptical Inquirer".

== Activities ==
In order to carry out its mission, the committee "maintains a network of people interested in critically examining paranormal, fringe science, and other claims, and in contributing to consumer education; prepares bibliographies of published materials that carefully examine such claims;encourages research by objective and impartial inquiry in areas where it is needed; convenes conferences and meetings; publishes articles that examine claims of the paranormal; does not reject claims on a priori grounds, antecedent to inquiry, but examines them objectively and carefully".

=== Standard ===
An axiom often repeated among CSI members is the quote "extraordinary claims require extraordinary evidence", which Carl Sagan made famous and adapted from an earlier quote by Marcello Truzzi: "An extraordinary claim requires extraordinary proof". (Truzzi in turn traced the idea back through the principle of Laplace to the philosopher David Hume.)

According to CSI member Martin Gardner, CSI regularly puts into practice H. L. Mencken's maxim "one horse-laugh is worth a thousand syllogisms."

=== Publications ===
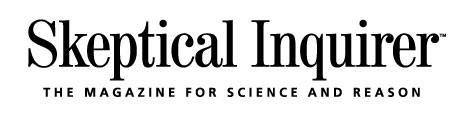
Logo of the Skeptical Inquirer

CSI publishes the magazine Skeptical Inquirer, which was founded by Truzzi, under the name The Zetetic. The journal was under Truzzi's editorship for the first year, until August 1977. The magazine was retitled to Skeptical Inquirer with Kendrick Frazier, former editor of Science News, serving as its editor. In June 2023, Stephen Hupp was named as the magazine's editor. Hupp replaced Stuart Vyse, who was the interim editor in November 2022 following the passing of Kendrick Frazier. In 1987, Cecil Adams of The Straight Dope called Skeptical Inquirer "one of the nation's leading antifruitcake journals". In addition, CSI publishes Skeptical Briefs, a quarterly newsletter for associate members.

CSI conducts and publishes investigations into Bigfoot and UFO sightings, psychics, astrologers, alternative medicine, religious cults, and paranormal or pseudoscientific claims.

=== Conferences ===
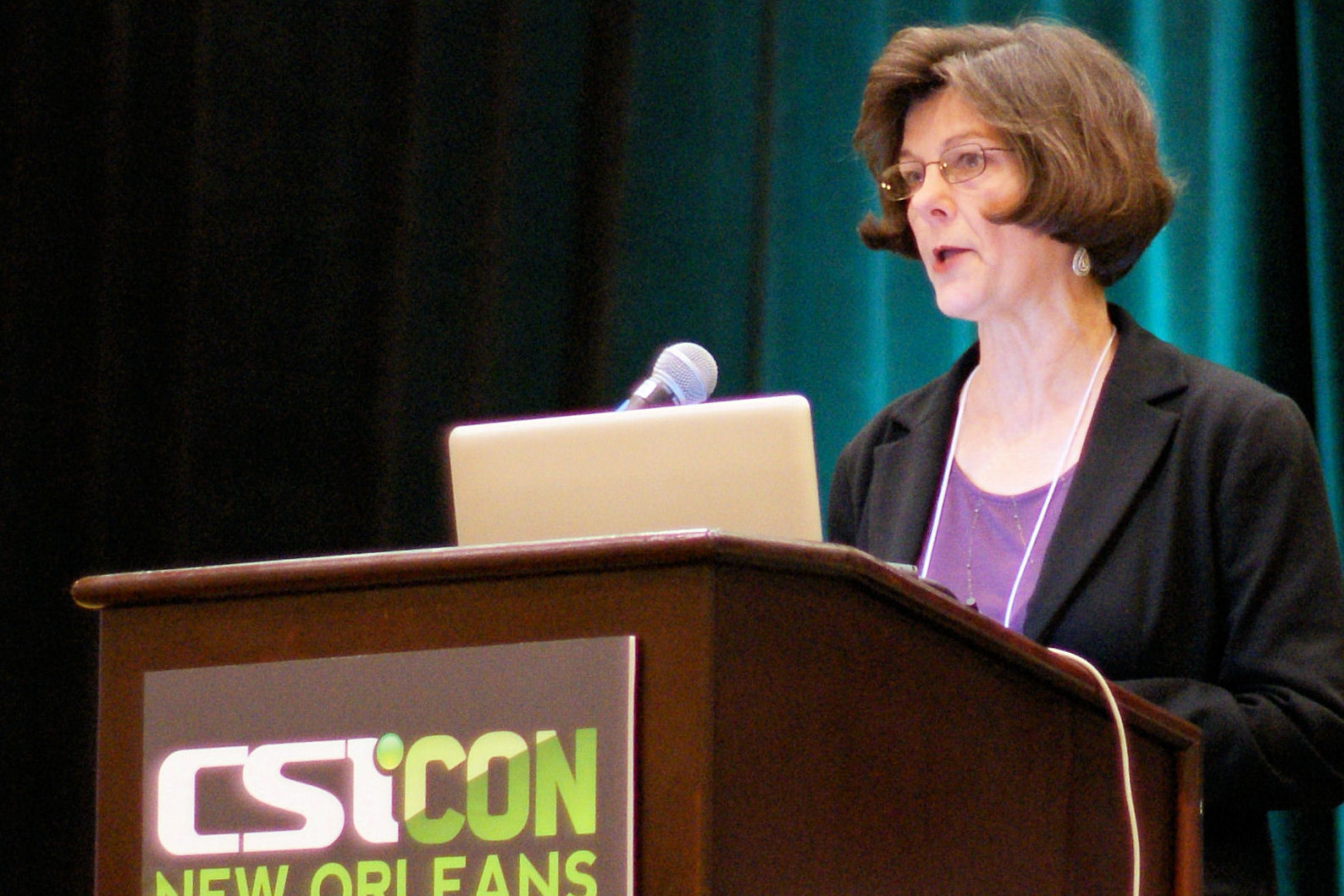
Barbara Forrest participating in the "Creation and Evolution" panel at CSICon 2011 in New Orleans

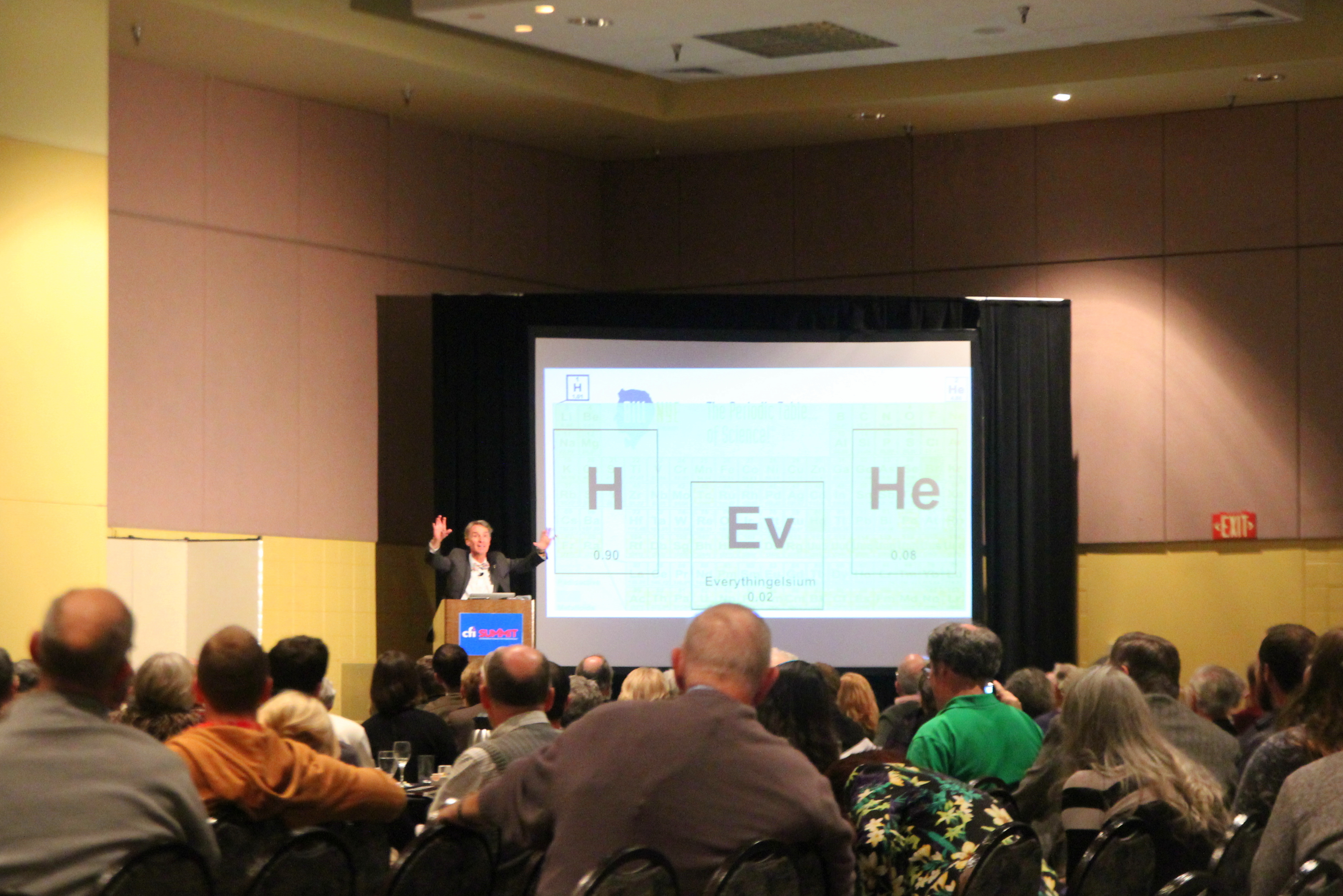
Bill Nye speaking about science education at CSICon 2013 in Tacoma, Washington

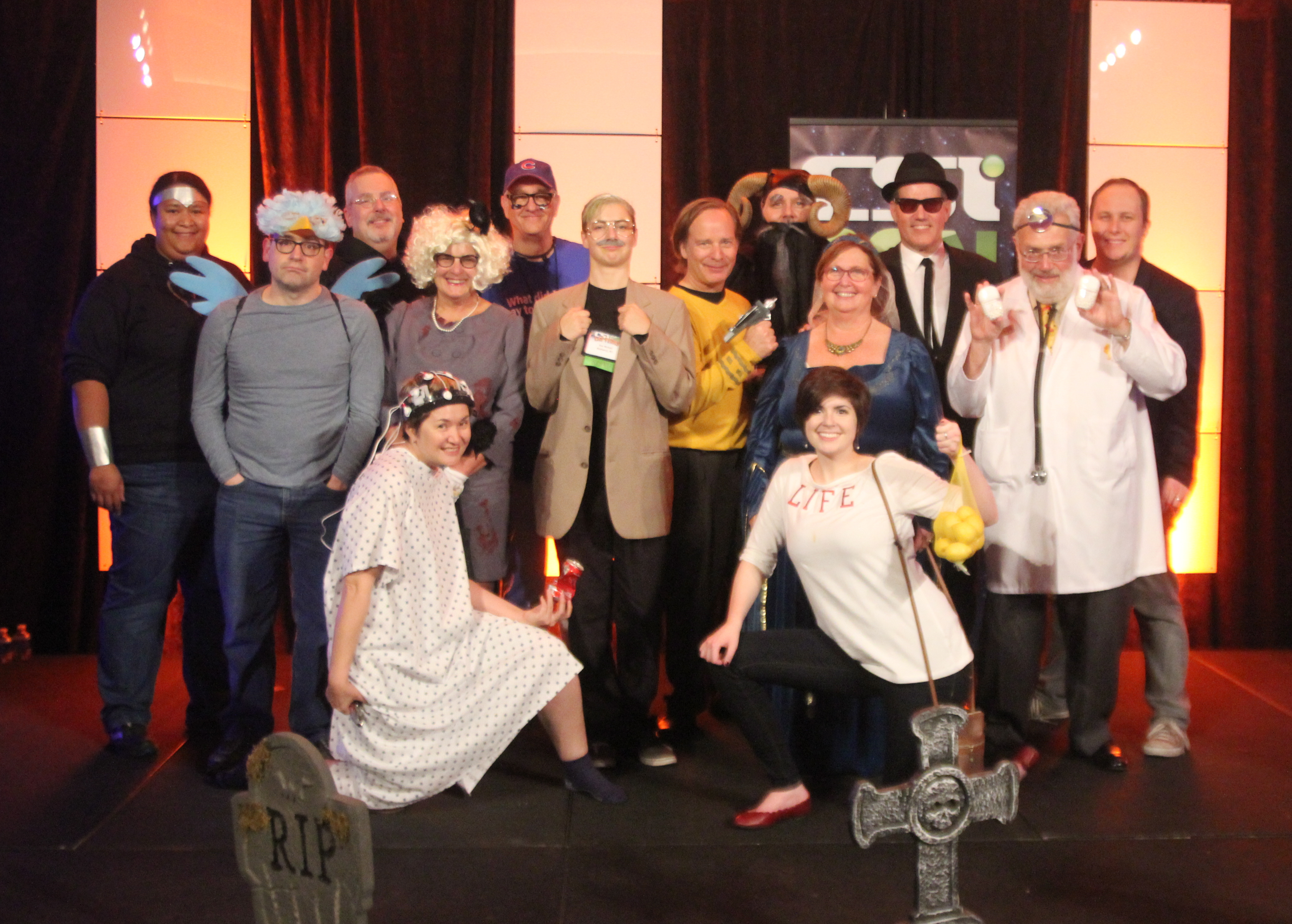
CSI staff at CSICon Halloween party, 2016

CSICOP has held dozens of conferences between 1983 and 2005, two of them in Europe, and all six World Skeptics Congresses so far were sponsored by it. Since 2011, the conference is known as CSICon. Two conventions have been held in conjunction with its sister and parent organizations, CSH and CFI, in 2013 and 2015. The conferences bring together some of the most prominent figures in scientific research, science communication, and skeptical activism, to exchange information on all topics of common concern and to strengthen the movement and community of skeptics.

CSI has also supported local grassroot efforts, such as SkeptiCamp community-organized conferences.

=== Response to mass media ===
Many CSI activities are oriented toward the media. As CSI's former executive director Lee Nisbet wrote in the 25th-anniversary issue of the group's journal, Skeptical Inquirer:

CSICOP originated in the spring of 1976 to fight mass-media exploitation of supposedly "occult" and "paranormal" phenomena. The strategy was twofold: First, to strengthen the hand of skeptics in the media by providing information that "debunked" paranormal wonders. Second, to serve as a "media watchdog" group that would direct public and media attention to egregious media exploitation of the supposed paranormal wonders. An underlying principle of action was to use the mainline media's thirst for public-attracting controversies to keep our activities in the media, hence the public eye.

As a media watchdog, CSI has "mobilized thousands of scientists, academics and responsible communicators" to criticize what it regards as "media's most blatant excesses". Criticism has focused on factual TV programming or newspaper articles offering support for paranormal claims, and programs such as The X-Files and Buffy the Vampire Slayer, which its members believe portray skeptics and science in a bad light and help to promote belief in the paranormal. CSI's website currently lists the email addresses of over ninety U.S. media organizations and encourages visitors to "directly influence" the media by contacting "the networks, the TV shows, and the editors responsible for the way [they portray] the world."

=== Following pseudoscientific and paranormal belief trends ===
CSI was quoted to consider pseudoscience topics to include yogic flying, therapeutic touch, astrology, fire walking, voodoo, magical thinking, Uri Geller, alternative medicine, channeling, psychic hotlines and detectives, near-death experiences, unidentified flying objects (UFOs), the Bermuda Triangle, homeopathy, faith healing, and reincarnation. CSI changes its focus with the changing popularity and prominence of what it considers to be pseudoscientific and paranormal beliefs. For example, as promoters of intelligent design increased their efforts to include it in school curricula in recent years, CSI stepped up its attention to the subject, creating an "Intelligent Design Watch" website publishing numerous articles on evolution and intelligent design in Skeptical Inquirer and on the Internet.

=== CSI Chief Investigator ===
In September 2022, Kenny Biddle was announced as CSI's Chief Investigator. He is a CSI Fellow and writes a column for Skeptical Inquirer called "A Closer Look" (2018–present), which focuses on his use of scientific skepticism to investigate paranormal claims, including ghost photography and video, ghost hunting equipment, UFOs and psychic ability. Biddle credits his previous careers as an auto mechanic, helicopter mechanic, and X-ray technician for building his skills in attention to detail, problem-solving, testing, and critical thinking. He also has co-written articles with Joe Nickell about ghost and miraculous photography. Biddle was a speaker at CSICon in 2019 and 2022.

=== Health and safety ===
CSI is concerned with paranormal or pseudoscientific claims that may endanger people's health or safety, such as the use of alternative medicine in place of science-based healthcare. Investigations by CSI and others, including consumer watchdog groups, law enforcement, and government regulatory agencies, have shown that the sale of alternative medicines, paranormal paraphernalia, or pseudoscience-based products can be enormously profitable. CSI says this profitability has provided various pro-paranormal groups large resources for advertising, lobbying efforts, and other forms of advocacy, to the detriment of public health and safety.

== Organization ==
=== Umbrella organization ===
The Center for Inquiry is the transnational non-profit umbrella organization comprising CSI, the Council for Secular Humanism, the Center for Inquiry – On Campus (national youth group) and the Commission for Scientific Medicine and Mental Health. These organizations share headquarters and some staff, and each has their own list of fellows and their distinct mandates. CSI generally addresses questions of religion only in cases in which testable scientific assertions have been made (such as weeping statues or faith healing).

=== Independent Investigation Group ===
The Center for Inquiry West, located in Hollywood, California Executive Director Jim Underdown founded the Independent Investigations Group (IIG), a volunteer-based organization in January 2000. The IIG investigates fringe science, paranormal, and extraordinary claims from a rational, scientific viewpoint and disseminates factual information about such inquiries to the public. IIG has offered a $50,000 prize "to anyone who can show, under proper observing conditions, evidence of any paranormal, supernatural, or occult power or event", to which 7 people applied from 2009 to 2012.

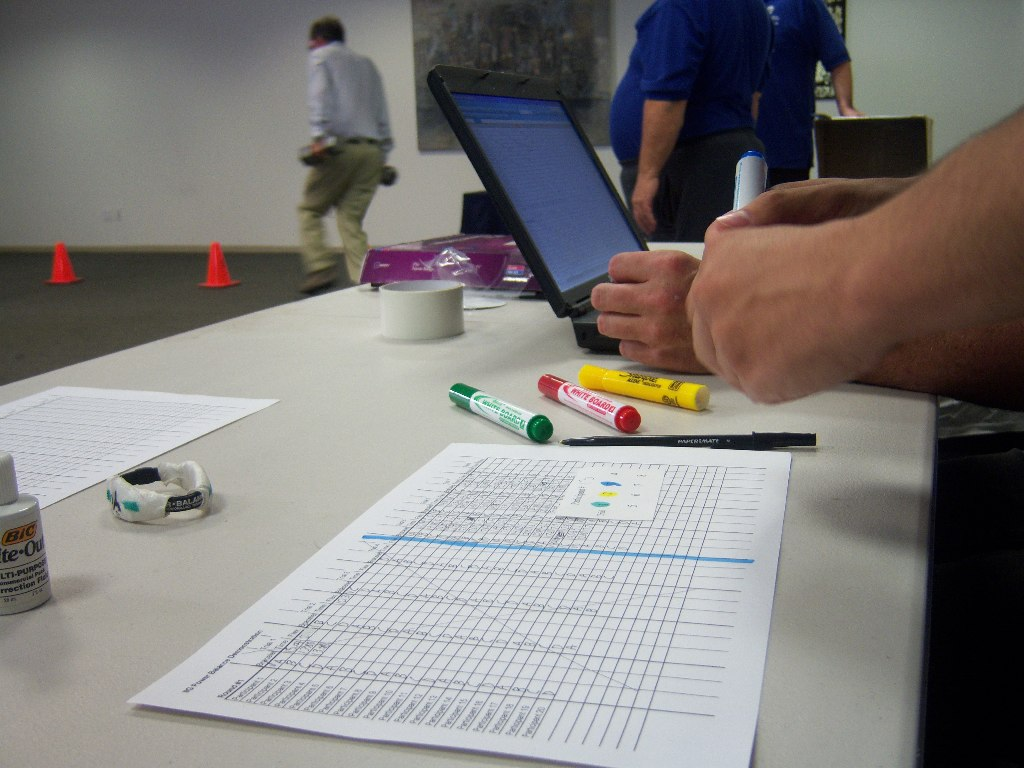
IIG testing Power Balance bracelet in progress, October 28, 2010

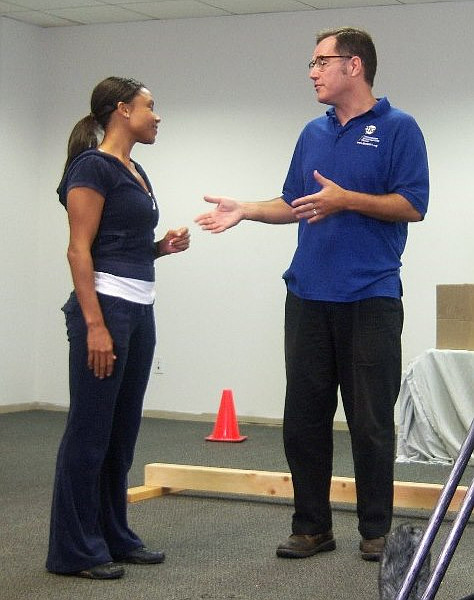
Dominique Dawes & IIG's James Underdown discussing test protocols, October 28, 2010

== Awards ==
=== In Praise of Reason Award ===
"The In Praise of Reason Award is given in recognition of distinguished contributions in the use of critical inquiry, scientific evidence, and reason in evaluating claims to knowledge." This is the highest award presented by CSI and is often presented at the CSIcon conferences.

Year	Person	Notes
1982	Martin Gardner	Awarded in Atlanta, Georgia, "In honor of his heroic efforts in defense of reason and the dignity of the skeptical attitude."
1984	Sidney Hook	Presented at Stanford University, Palo Alto, California, by CSICOP Chairman Paul Kurtz.
1985	Antony Flew	Awarded in London by Paul Kurtz, "[I]n recognition of his long-standing contributions to the use of methods of critical inquiry, scientific evidence, and reason in evaluating claims to knowledge and solving social problems."
1986	Stephen Jay Gould	Presented at the University of Colorado, Boulder "In recognition of his long-standing contributions to the use of the methods of critical inquiry, scientific evidence, and reason in evaluating claims to knowledge and solving social problems".
1987	Carl Sagan	Pasadena, California CSICOP awards banquet
1988	Douglas Hofstadter	Presented at the Chicago CSICOP conference
1990	Cornelis de Jager	Presented at the Brussels 1990 CSICOP conference
1990	Gerard Piel	Awarded at the Washington D. C. conference March 30-April 1.
1991	Donald Johanson	Awarded at the 15th Anniversary of CSICOP in Berkeley, California.
1992	Richard Dawkins	Presented at the CSICOP Dallas, Texas Convention
1994	Elizabeth Loftus	Awarded at the CSI Seattle Conference June 23–26 "For her research in memory and eyewitness testimony."
1996	Leon Lederman	Awarded at the First World Congress in Amherst, New York, presented by Cornelis de Jager
2000	Lin Zixin	Lin Zixin was awarded in absentia.
2001	Kendrick Frazier	Awarded at the first Center for Inquiry International Conference in Atlanta, Georgia. Frazier "spoke of his feelings... 'I am more a toiler in the editorial fields than an inhabitant of the lofty spires of academia, so that makes me all the more appreciative".
2002	Marvin Minsky	Awarded at the Fourth World Skeptics Conference (June 2002) in Burbank, California.
2003	Ray Hyman	Presented at the Albuquerque conference by friend James Alcock. "Ray Hyman, from whom I-and I am sure all of us-continue to learn so much."
2004	James Alcock	Presented at the Center for Inquiry – Transnational Conference in Toronto, Canada. Vern Bullough presented Alcock with the award. Alcock stated that many scientists do not care about pseudoscience as they don't see it as a threat on science, but he reminds the audience that "fundamentalist religious viewpoints" and "alternative medicine" are "very real threats".
2009	James Randi	Presented at the 12th World Congress in Maryland. Paul Kurtz presented the award saying "Your greatest quality is that you are an educator, a teacher. You have shown that the easiest people to deceive are PhDs, a great insight to all of us. You expose myths and hoaxes.... You stand out in history."
2011	Bill Nye	Presented at CSIcon New Orleans conference. Eugenie Scott stated "If you think Bill is popular among skeptics, you should attend a science teacher conference where he is speaking" it is standing room only. She continues by saying that no one has more fun as Nye when he is "demonstrating, principles of science."

=== Candle Awards ===
Founded at the 1996 World Skeptics Congress in Buffalo, New York, the Council for Media Integrity gives these awards that were named in inspiration by Carl Sagan's book, The Demon-Haunted World: Science as a Candle in the Dark. The council is made up of scientists, media and academics, all concerned with the "balanced portrayal of science". The Candle in the Dark Award is presented to those who show "outstanding contributions to the public's understanding of science and scientific principles" and to "reward sound science television programming". The Snuffed Candle Award is awarded to those "for encouraging credulity, presenting pseudoscience as genuine, and contributing to the public's lack of understanding of the methods of scientific inquiry." The council urges TV "producers to label documentary-type shows depicting the paranormal as either entertainment or fiction". The council also provides the media with contact information of experts who would be willing and able to answer questions and be interviewed for paranormal topics.

Year	Person	Media
1997	Bill Nye and Dan Aykroyd	Nye received the Candle in the Dark Award for his "lively, creative... endeavor". Aykroyd "was presented in absentia the Snuffed Candle Award for hosting Psi Factor and being a "long-time promoter ... of paranormal claims" Following the awards, Joe Nickell wrote to Aykroyd asking for the research behind the "cases" presented on Psi Factor. Particularly a claim that NASA scientists were "killed while investigating a meteor crash and giant eggs were found and incubated, yielding a flea the size of a hog".
1998	Scientific American Frontiers and Art Bell	Hosted by Alan Alda, SAF's episode "Beyond Science" was singled out by the Council for Media Integrity for its examination of the paranormal. Art Bell was recognized by the council for "perpetuating conspiracy myths... and mystery mongering". When Bell learned of the award he replied "A mind should not be so open that the brains fall out, however it should not be so closed that whatever gray matter which does reside may not be reached. On behalf of those with the smallest remaining open aperture, I accept with honor."
2003	Edgar Sanchez reporter for the Sacramento Bee and Larry King	Awarded at the Albuquerque, New Mexico Conference. Sanchez received the Candle in the Dark award for his column "Scam Alert" where he has written about Nigerian scams, car-mileage fraud and phony police detectives. King received the Snuffed Candle award for "encouraging credulity, presenting pseudoscience as genuine".

=== Robert P. Balles Prize ===
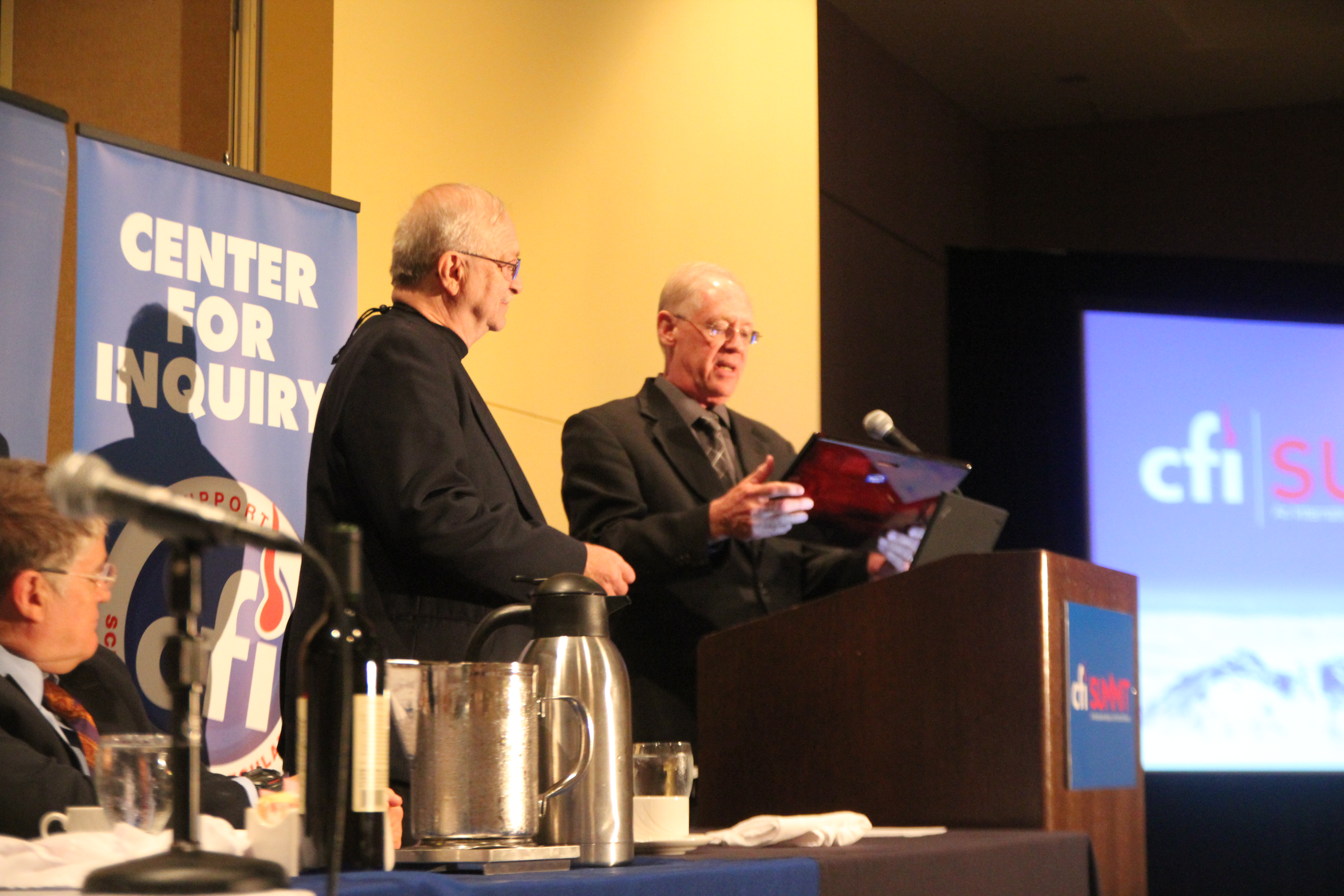
Frazier awards author Joe Nickell the Balles Prize for his book The Science of Ghosts – 2013.

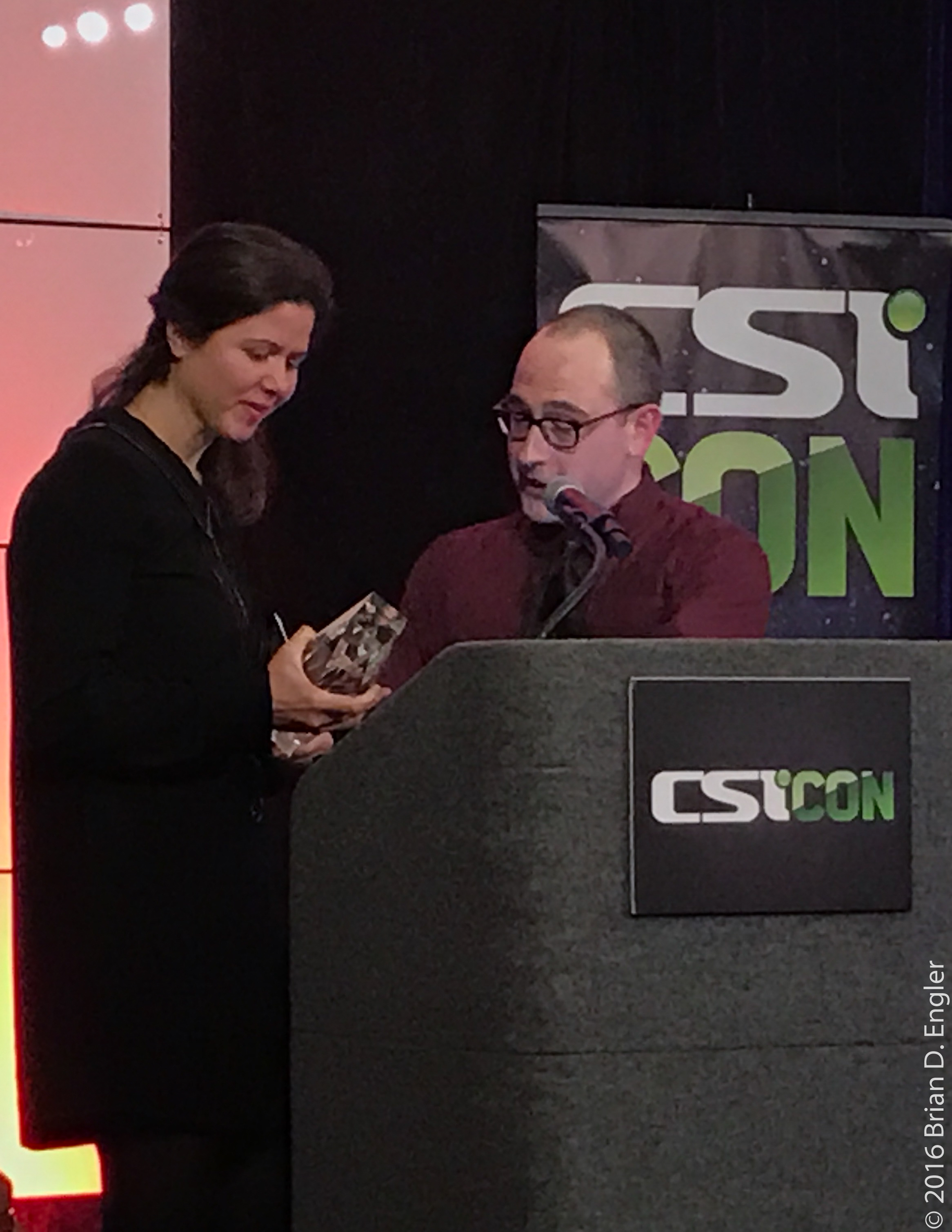
Julia Belluz receives 2016 Balles Award from Paul Fidalgo.

Tim Callahan receives 2018 Balles Award.

Paul Fidalgo from Center For Inquiry introduces 2019 Balles Award Winner A Deal with the Devil.

CSI awards the Robert P. Balles Annual Prize in Critical Thinking annually. The $2,500 award is given to the "creator of the published work that best exemplifies healthy skepticism, logical analysis, or empirical science". Robert P. Balles, "a practicing Christian", established this permanent endowment fund through a Memorial Fund. Center for Inquiry's "established criteria for the prize include use of the most parsimonious theory to fit data or to explain apparently preternatural phenomena."

Year	Person	Media	Notes
2005	Andrew Skolnick, Ray Hyman and Joe Nickell	The Girl with X-ray Eyes	Shared the first award for their 2005 reports on CSICOP's testing of Natasha Demkina, a girl who claimed to have X-ray eyes.
2006	Ben Goldacre	For his column in The Guardian U.K. newspaper, Bad Science	Columns include "Dyslexia 'cure' fails to pass the tests", "Bring me a God helmet, and bring it now", "Kick the habit with wacky wave energy", "Brain Gym exercises do pupils no favors" and "Magnetic attraction? Shhhh. It's a secret"
2007	Natalie Angier	The Canon: A Whirligig Tour of the Beautiful Basics of Science	"[S}he thoughtfully explores what it means to think scientifically and the benefits of extending the scientific ethos to all areas of human life."
2008	Leonard Mlodinow	The Drunkard's Walk: How Randomness Rules our Lives	
2009	Michael Specter	Denialism: How Irrational Thinking Hinders Scientific Progress, Harms the Planet, and Threatens Our Lives	
2010	Steven Novella	Body of work including The Skeptics' Guide to the Universe podcast, Science-Based Medicine, Neurologica, Skepticial Inquirer column The Science of Medicine and the "tireless travel and lecture schedule on behalf of skepticism"	"The truly most amazing thing is he does this all on a volunteer basis." According to Barry Karr "You may be the hardest worker in all of skepticism".
2011	Richard Wiseman	Paranormality: Why We See What Isn't There	"Wiseman is not simply interested in looking at a claim... He is interested in showing us how easy it is for us to be deceived and how easily we can be fooled and fool others."
2012	Steven Salzberg and Joe Nickell	Salzberg's column for Forbes magazine, Fighting Pseudoscience and Nickell's book The Science of Ghosts – Searching for Spirits of the Dead	"Salzberg regularly shines the light of reason on the false or dubious claims ... with a clear and accessible voice, and with a healthy dose of humor." And "Accessibility and humor, along with unmatched rigor and curiosity, are what famed Joe Nickell, ... has been bringing to his work for decades."
2013	Paul Offit	Do You Believe in Magic? The Sense and Nonsense of Alternative Medicine	"Offit is a literal lifesaver... educates the public about the dangers of alternative medicine, may save many, many more."
2014	Joseph Schwarcz and to the creators, producers, and writers of Cosmos: A Spacetime Odyssey	Is That a Fact? and Cosmos: A Spacetime Odyssey	"Cosmos: A Spacetime Odyssey opened the eyes of a new generation to humanity's triumphs, its mistakes, and its astounding potential to reach unimagined heights.... Is That a Fact? unflinchingly takes on all manner of popular misinformation."
2015	Julia Belluz	Vox.com	"We need more people in the media doing what Julia Belluz does... "
2016	Maria Konnikova	The Confidence Game	"The Confidence Game could not have come at a more crucial time, as the general public is overwhelmed day in and day out by attempts to play on their biases and prejudices[.]"
2017	Donald Prothero, Tim Callahan	UFOs, Chemtrails, and Aliens	This book "not only refute(s) false claims and misguided beliefs ... but more importantly they also arm readers with the tools they will need to fairly evaluate any extraordinary claim they come across"
2018	Blake Ellis, Melanie Hicken	A Deal With The Devil	"Investigative reporters Blake Ellis and Melanie Hicken exposed the complex inner workings of a case of psychic fraud that spanned several decades and bilked over $200,000,000 from the mostly elderly victims."
2019	Susan Gerbic	The Psychic Stinger	"Over the course of dozens of meticulously executed stings, tests, and exposés, Gerbic has uncovered the fraud underlying the claims of several celebrity psychics. She has assembled a team of dedicated volunteers who assist her in planning and research for elaborate and rigorous undercover operations that reveal the tricks employed by psychics and mediums."
2020	Timothy Caulfield	A Booster Shot for Science	"Caulfield's clear, accessible, and hopeful advocacy of science and evidence were invaluable for a public desperate to navigate their way through the infodemic during the pandemic."
2023	Kendrick Frazier	posthumously awarded to longtime Skeptical Inquirer editor	"The presentation began with a lovely tribute video, showcasing Frazier's forty-five year history with CSI and Skeptical Inquirer magazine. Free Inquiry editor Paul Fidalgo then took the stage, offering a moving and funny tribute to the man who had been at the helm of Skeptical Inquirer longer than Fidalgo himself has been alive. In all that time, Fidalgo noted, Frazier's enthusiasm for the work and passion for science and skepticism never waned."
2026	Michael E. Mann and Peter Hotez	Science Under Siege: How to Fight the Five Most Powerful Forces That Threaten Our World	"To best address the challenges threatening our survival on Earth, we need to listen to experts, especially when the experts agree with each other," said Stephen Hupp, executive director of the Committee for Skeptical Inquiry. "Michael Mann and Peter Hotez are distinguished experts from two completely different fields, both facing the same types of threats to their work."

=== Responsibility in Journalism Award ===
CSICOP seeking to acknowledge and encourage "fair and balanced reporting of paranormal claims" established the Responsibility in Journalism Award in 1984. Frazier stated that "There are many responsible reporters who want to do a good job in covering these kinds of controversial, exotic topics." Beginning in 1991, CSI began awarding in two categories, "print" and "broadcast".

Year	Person	Media	Notes
1984	Leon Jaroff and Davyd Yost	Jaroff as managing editor of Discover magazine established the "Skeptical Eye" column. Yost of the Columbus, Ohio Citizen Journal specifically for a story about a poltergeist.	Frazier said of Yost "In the mold of careful, responsible journalism... [he made] a special effort to get outside expert opinion". Philip Klass stated that Jaroff has "political courage" for his column that offers "useful perspectives... of claims of the paranormal".
1986	Boyce Rensberger and Ward Lucas	Rensberger, science reporter for The Washington Post and Lucas "anchor and investigative reporter KUSA-TV Channel 9 Denver"	Presented at the University of Colorado, Boulder, "In recognition of contributions to fair and balanced reporting of paranormal claims".
1987	Lee Dembart, Ed Busch, and Michael Willesee	Dembart from Los Angeles Times, Willesee, Australian journalist and Busch, Texas radio talk-show host	Presented at Pasadena CSICOP award banquet.
1988	C. Eugene Emery Jr. and Milton Rosenberg	Emery is a science and medical reporter for the Providence Journal and a contributor to SI. Rosenberg is the host of Extension 720 a program on WGN-Radio in Chicago	Presented at the Chicago CSICOP conference Emery researched claims of faith-healer Ralph A. DiOrio and wrote about the results in his journal.
1990	Stephen Doig	Science Editor for the Miami Herald	Awarded at the Washington, D.C., conference, March 30-April 1.
1991	Keay Davidson	Science editor for the San Francisco Examiner with co-writer Janet L. Hopson, who were both recognized for their work into the investigation of the claims of Koko the talking ape.	Print Category – Awarded at the 15th Anniversary of CSICOP in Berkeley, California
1991	Mark Curtis	Reporter for WEAR-TV Channel 3, Pensacola, Florida	Investigation into the Gulf Breeze UFO incident exposing trick photography. Awarded at the 15th Anniversary of CSICOP in Berkeley, California
1992	Andrew Skolnick	Associate editor of Medical News & Perspectives for the Journal of the American Medical Association	Presented at the CSICOP Dallas, Texas Convention
1992	Henry Gordon	Columnist, magician and author	Presented at the CSICOP Dallas, Texas Convention
1994	Jack Smith	Columnist with the Los Angeles Times	Awarded at the CSI Seattle Conference June 23–26
1996	Phillip Adams, Piero Angela and Pierre Berton		Presented at the First World Congress in Buffalo, New York, the 20th Anniversary of CSICOP.

=== Frontiers of Science and Technology Award ===
Year	Person	Media	Notes
1986	Paul MacCready	AeroVironment	Presented at the University of Colorado, Boulder "In recognition of his innovative and creative contributions to technology and his outstanding defense of critical thinking".
1987	Murray Gell-Mann		Presented at Pasadena CSICOP award banquet.

=== Public Education in Science Award ===
In recognition of distinguished contributions to the testing of scientific principles and to the public understanding of science.

Year	Person	Notes
1990	Richard Berendzen	Presented at Pasadena CSICOP award banquet.
1991	Eugenie Scott	Awarded at the 15th Anniversary of CSICOP in Berkeley, California
1992	Sergei Kapitza	Presented at the CSICOP Dallas, Texas Convention
1994	John Maddox	Awarded at the CSI Seattle Conference June 23–26
1996	Dean Edell	Presented at the First World Congress in Buffalo, New York, the 20th Anniversary of CSICOP.
2000	Richard Wiseman	Presented at the Third World Congress held in Sydney, Australia.

=== Distinguished Skeptic Award ===
Year	Person	Notes
1990	Henri Broch	Awarded for "his pioneer work with Minitel and making scientific critiques of the paranormal available to a wider audience in France. Presented at the Brussels 1990 CSICOP conference.
1991	Susan Blackmore	Awarded at the 15th Anniversary of CSICOP in Berkeley, California
1992	Evry Schatzman	Presented at the CSICOP Dallas, Texas Convention
1994	Philip Klass	Awarded at the CSI Seattle Conference June 23–26
1996	James Randi	Presented at the First World Congress in Buffalo, New York, the 20th Anniversary of CSICOP.
1998	Amardeo Sarma	Presented at the Second World Congress
2000	Barry Williams, Joe Nickell	Presented at the Third World Congress held in Sydney, Australia. Williams was recognized for his "yeoman service to organized skepticism".
2001	Harlan Ellison	Presented at the Fourth World Skeptics Conference in Burbank, California.
2002	Marcia Angell	
2003	Jan Harold Brunvand	Presented at the Albuquerque, New Mexico Conference

=== Founder Award ===
Presented to founder and chairman of CSICOP, Paul Kurtz "In recognition of your wisdom, courage, and foresight in establishing and leading the world's first public education organization devoted to distinguishing science from pseudoscience". Award was given April 26, 1986 at the University of Colorado, Boulder.

=== The Martin Gardner Lifetime Achievement Award ===
Awarded to author and entertainer Steve Allen at the First World Skeptic Congress held in Buffalo, New York, in 1996. Allen was recognized for his lifetime achievement "in cultivating the public appreciation of critical thinking and science".

=== Lifetime Achievement Award ===
Presented to Eugenie Scott by Ronald Lindsay at the CFI Summit in Tacoma, Washington, in 2013 calling her a "Champion of Evolution Education".

=== The Isaac Asimov Award ===
Established to acknowledge the contributions to humanity and science by Isaac Asimov. This award is given to those who has "shown outstanding commitment and ability in communicating the achievements, methods, and issues of science to the public".

Year	Person	Notes
1994	Carl Sagan	Janet Asimov, when informed that Carl Sagan would be the first recipient of the Isaac Asimov Award, said "There is no one better qualified... than his good friend and colleague Carl Sagan. Isaac was particularly fond of Carl. He was also in awe of Carl's genius, and proud that he was so adept at communicating science to the public... thank you for remembering my beloved husband in this way."
1995	Stephen Jay Gould	Presented at the First World Congress in Buffalo, New York, the 20th Anniversary of CSICOP

=== The Pantheon of Skeptics ===
In April 2011, the executive council of CSI created The Pantheon of Skeptics, a special roster honoring deceased fellows of the Committee who have made the most outstanding contributions to the causes of science and skepticism. This roster is part of an ongoing effort to provide a sense of history about the modern skeptical movement.

The Pantheon of Skeptics
Person	Notes
George O. Abell	astronomer and popularizer of science
Steve Allen	entertainer, author, critic
Jerry Andrus	magician and writer
Isaac Asimov	biochemist and author of science and science fiction
Robert A. Baker	psychologist
T. X. Barber	psychologist
Barry Beyerstein	biopsychologist
Bart J. Bok	astronomer
Milbourne Christopher	magician and writer
Francis H. Crick	Nobel laureate molecular biologist
L. Sprague de Camp	science fiction author and skeptic
Martin Gardner	columnist and popularizer of mathematics and science
Stephen Jay Gould	evolutionary biologist, and historian of science
D. O. Hebb	neuropsychologist
Sidney Hook	philosopher
Leon Jaroff	science writer and editor
Philip J. Klass	engineer, journalist, and UFO skeptic
Paul Kurtz	philosopher, skeptic and prominent secular humanist
Paul MacCready	scientist, engineer, inventor
John Maddox	biologist and science writer
William V. Mayer	biologist
Walter McCrone	microscopist and expert in forensic science
Ernest Nagel	philosopher of science
H. Narasimhaiah	physicist
W. V. Quine	philosopher and logician
Carl Sagan	astronomer and science popularizer
Wallace Sampson	professor of clinical medicine, alternative medicine skeptic
Glenn T. Seaborg	Nobel laureate in chemistry
B. F. Skinner	psychologist
Victor Stenger	particle physicist and philosopher
Stephen Toulmin	philosopher, author, and ethicist

=== CSI fellows ===
According to the Jan/Feb 2021 Skeptical Inquirer the role of a CSI fellow is to "promote scientific inquiry, critical investigation, and the use of reason in examining controversial and extraordinary claims. Fellows are elected for their distinguished contributions to science and skepticsim as well as their ability to provide practical advice and expertise on various issues and projects deemed important to the work of the Committee. Election as a fellow is based upon the following criteria, approved by the CSI Executive Council:

- 1. Outstanding contribution to a scientific discipline, preferably, though not restricted to, a field related to the skeptical movement
- 2. Outstanding contribution to the communication of science and/or critical thinking or
- 3. Outstanding contribution to the skeptical movement.

Fellows of CSI serve as ambassadors of science and skepticism and may be consulted on issues related to their area of expertise by the media or by the Committee. They may be asked to support statements issued by CSI and contribute commentary or articles to CSI outlets. ... Election to the position of fellow is a lifetime appointment. However, if in the opinion of the CSI Executive Council an individual's behavior or scholarship renders that person unable to continue to qualify for the position of fellow under the criteria listed or to effectively fulfill the role of ambassador or science and skepticism, CSI may choose to remove them from the list of fellows."

==== Current CSI fellows ====
This is a list of current CSI fellows; an asterisk denotes the person is also a member of the CSI Executive Council.

- James Alcock*
- Marcia Angell
- Kimball Atwood IV
- Banachek
- Stephen Barrett
- Robert Bartholomew
- Jann Johnson Bellamy
- Kenny Biddle
- Susan Blackmore
- Sandra Blakeslee
- Alejandro Borgo
- Mark Boslough
- Glenn Branch
- Henri Broch
- Jan Harold Brunvand
- Sean B. Carroll
- Thomas R. Casten
- Timothy Caulfield
- Clark R. Chapman
- K.C. Cole
- John Cook
- Jerry Coyne
- Manfred Cuntz
- Richard Dawkins
- Geoffrey A. Dean
- Daniel Dennett
- Ann Druyan
- Sanal Edamaruku
- Taner Edis
- Edzard Ernst
- Kenneth Feder
- Krista Federspiel
- Kevin Folta
- Barbara Forrest
- Craig A. Foster
- Andrew Fraknoi
- Chris French
- Julia Galef
- Luigi Garlaschelli
- Maryanne Garry
- Susan Gerbic
- Thomas Gilovich
- David Gorski
- Natalie Grams
- David Robert Grimes
- Wendy M. Grossman
- Susan Haack
- Raymond E. Hall
- Alan W. Harris
- Michael Heap
- David Helfand
- Terence Hines
- Douglas Hofstadter
- Gerald Holton
- Stephen Hupp
- Deborah Hyde
- Ray Hyman*
- Stuart D. Jordan
- Barry Karr
- Ed Krupp
- Stephen Law
- Nathan H. Lents
- Stephan Lewandowsky
- Jere H. Lipps
- Elizabeth Loftus
- William M. London
- Leighann Lord
- Daniel Loxton
- Michael E. Mann
- David Marks
- Michael Marshall
- Lee McIntyre
- Mario Mendez-Acosta
- Tim Mendham
- Kenneth R. Miller
- David Morrison
- Richard A. Muller
- Meera Nanda
- Jan Willem Nienhuys
- Lee Nisbet
- Matthew C. Nisbet
- Steven Novella
- Bill Nye
- James Oberg
- Paul Offit
- Naomi Oreskes
- Loren Pankratz
- Natália Pasternak Taschner
- John Allen Paulos
- Clifford A. Pickover
- Massimo Pigliucci
- Steven Pinker
- Massimo Polidoro
- ~~James L. Powell~~ (Note: In 2015, James Lawrence Powell was named a fellow for the Committee for Skeptical Inquiry. He resigned in March 2022 in protest against the publication of an article in Skeptical Inquirer by CSI fellow Mark Boslough regarding the Bunch et al. Tall el-Hammam air burst paper, citing a departure by the CSI from "every tenet of proper skepticism". However, further research published by Boslough led to Scientific Reports retracting the Bunch et al. paper, indicating this criticism was unfounded.)
- Anthony Pratkanis
- Donald Prothero
- Benjamin Radford
- Amardeo Sarma*
- Richard Saunders
- Joe Schwarcz
- Eugenie Scott*
- Seth Shostak
- Gale M. Sinatra
- Simon Singh
- Dick Smith
- Keith E. Stanovich
- Karen Stollznow
- Jill Tarter
- Carol Tavris
- Dave Thomas
- Nick Tiller
- Leonard Tramiel
- Melanie Trecek-King
- Neil deGrasse Tyson
- James Underdown
- Joseph Uscinski
- Bertha Vazquez
- Indre Viskontas
- Marilyn vos Savant
- Stuart Vyse*
- Steven Weinberg
- Mick West
- Richard Wiseman
- Benjamin Wolozin
- Lin Zixin

==== Former CSI fellows ====
This is a list of former CSI fellows not included in the Pantheon of Skeptics.

- Edoardo Amaldi
- Irving Biederman
- Brand Blanshard
- Vern Bullough
- Bette Chambers
- Daniel Cohen
- John R. Cole
- Frederick Crews
- Cornelis de Jager
- Eric Dingwall
- Mark Edward
- Paul Edwards
- Christopher Evans
- Charles M. Fair
- Antony Flew
- Kendrick Frazier
- Yves Galifret
- Henry Gordon
- Saul Green
- Harriet Hall
- C. E. M. Hansel
- Albert Hibbs
- Lawrence Jerome
- Sergei Kapitsa
- Larry Kusche
- Scott O. Lilienfeld
- Marvin Minsky
- Dorothy Nelkin
- Joe Nickell
- Jay Pasachoff
- Graham Reed
- Milton J. Rosenberg
- Evry Schatzman
- Thomas Sebeok
- Elie A. Shneour
- Robert Steiner
- Marcello Truzzi
- E. O. Wilson
- Marvin Zelen
- Lin Zixin

== Controversy and criticism ==
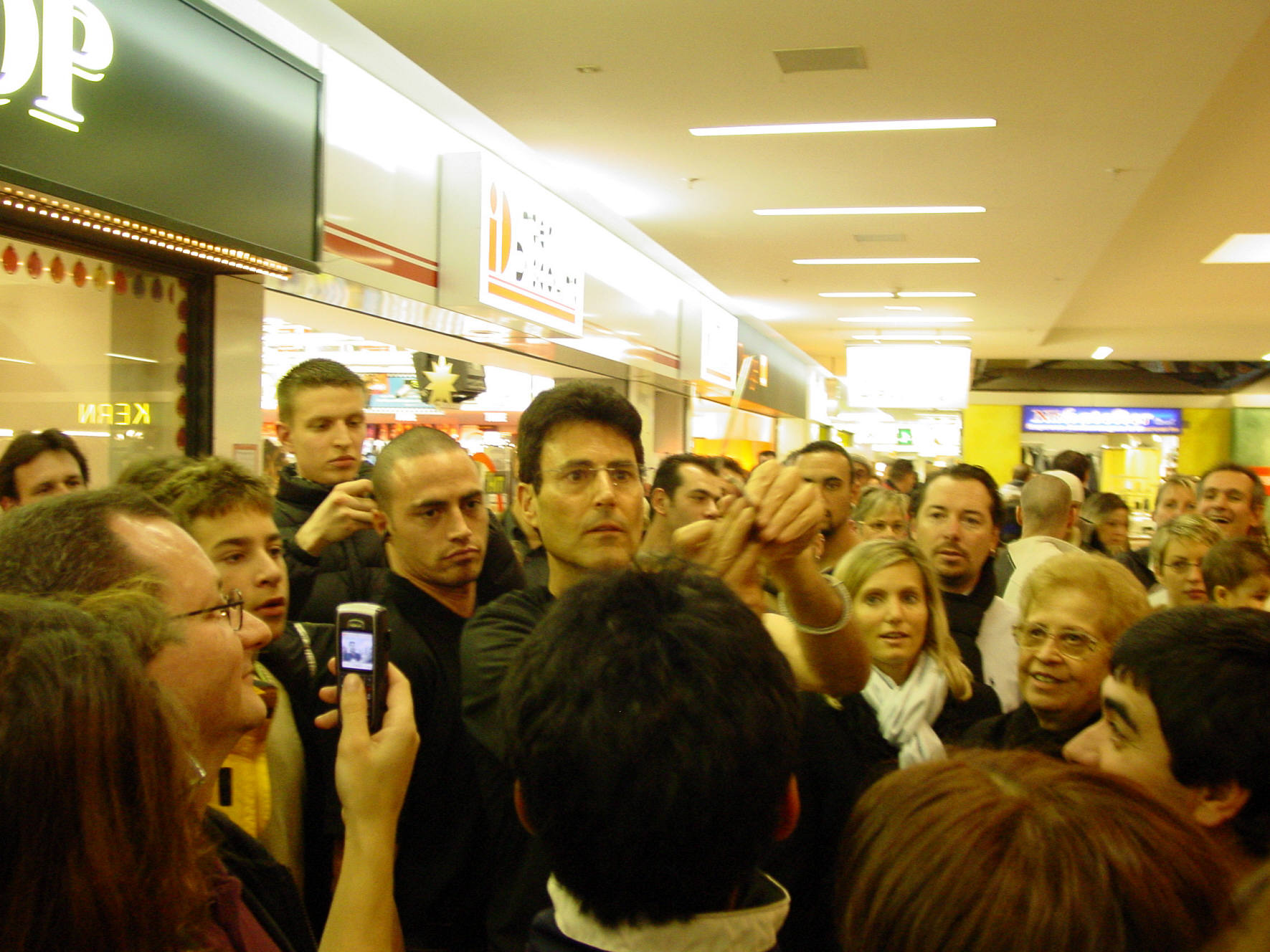
Uri Geller filed a number of unsuccessful lawsuits against CSICOP.

CSI's activities have garnered criticism from individuals or groups which have been the focus of the organization's attention. Television celebrity and claimed psychic Uri Geller was formerly in open dispute with the organization, filing a number of unsuccessful lawsuits against them.

Some criticism has also come from within the scientific community, and at times from within CSI itself. Marcello Truzzi, one of CSICOP's co-founders, left the organization after only a short time, arguing that many of those involved "tend to block honest inquiry, in my opinion. Most of them are not agnostic toward claims of the paranormal; they are out to knock them. [...] When an experiment of the paranormal meets their requirements, then they move the goal posts." Truzzi coined the term pseudoskeptic to describe critics in whom he detected such an attitude.

=== Mars effect, 1975 ===
An early controversy concerned the so-called Mars effect: French statistician Michel Gauquelin's claim that champion athletes are more likely to be born when the planet Mars is in certain positions in the sky. In late 1975, prior to the formal launch of CSICOP, astronomer Dennis Rawlins, along with Paul Kurtz, George Abell and Marvin Zelen (all subsequent members of CSICOP) began investigating the claim. Rawlins, a founding member of CSICOP at its launch in May 1976, resigned in early 1980 claiming that other CSICOP researchers had used incorrect statistics, faulty science, and outright falsification in an attempt to debunk Gauquelin's claims. In an article for the pro-paranormal magazine Fate, he wrote: "I am still skeptical of the occult beliefs CSICOP was created to debunk. But I have changed my mind about the integrity of some of those who make a career of opposing occultism." CSICOP's Philip J. Klass responded by circulating an article to CSICOP members critical of Rawlins' arguments and motives; Klass's unpublished response, refused publication by Fate, itself became the target for further criticism.

=== Church of Scientology, 1977 ===
In 1977, an FBI raid on the offices of the Church of Scientology uncovered a project to discredit CSICOP so that it and its publications would cease criticism of Dianetics and Scientology. This included forging a CIA memo and sending it to media sources, including The New York Times, to spread rumors that CSICOP was a front group for the CIA. A letter from CSICOP founder Paul Kurtz was forged to discredit him in the eyes of parapsychology researchers.

=== Natasha Demkina, 2004 ===
In 2004, CSICOP was accused of scientific misconduct over its involvement in the Discovery Channel's test of the "girl with X-ray eyes", Natasha Demkina. In a self-published commentary, Nobel Prize-winning physicist Brian Josephson criticized the test and evaluation methods and argued that the results should have been deemed "inconclusive" rather than judged in the negative. Josephson, the director of the University of Cambridge's Mind–Matter Unification Project, questioned the researchers' motives, saying: "On the face of it, it looks as if there was some kind of plot to discredit the teenage claimed psychic by setting up the conditions to make it likely that they could pass her off as a failure." Ray Hyman, one of the three researchers who designed and conducted the test, published a response to this and other criticisms. CSI's Commission for Scientific Medicine and Mental Health also published a detailed response to these and other objections, saying that the choice of critical level was appropriate, because her claims were unlikely to be true:

I decided against setting the critical level at seven because this would require Natasha to be 100% accurate in our test. We wanted to give her some leeway. More important, setting the critical value at seven would make it difficult to detect a true effect. On the other hand, I did not want to set the critical value at four because this would be treating the hypothesis that she could see into people's bodies as if it were highly plausible. The compromise was to set the value at five.

=== General criticism and reply ===
On a more general level, proponents of parapsychology have accused CSI of pseudoskepticism, and an overly dogmatic and arrogant approach based on a priori convictions. A 1992 article in The Journal of the American Society for Psychical Research, an organ for the Parapsychological Association, suggests that CSI's aggressive style of skepticism could discourage scientific research into the paranormal. Astronomer Carl Sagan wrote on this in 1995:

Have I ever heard a skeptic wax superior and contemptuous? Certainly. I've even sometimes heard, to my retrospective dismay, that unpleasant tone in my own voice. There are human imperfections on both sides of this issue. Even when it's applied sensitively, scientific skepticism may come across as arrogant, dogmatic, heartless, and dismissive of the feelings and deeply held beliefs of others ... CSICOP is imperfect. In certain cases [criticism of CSICOP] is to some degree justified. But from my point of view CSICOP serves an important social function – as a well-known organization to which media can apply when they wish to hear the other side of the story, especially when some amazing claim of pseudoscience is judged newsworthy ... CSICOP represents a counterbalance, although not yet nearly a loud enough voice, to the pseudoscience gullibility that seems second nature to so much of the media.

== See also ==
- Lists about skepticism
- National Council Against Health Fraud
- Point of Inquiry – CSI podcast
- Quackwatch
