= Leon Jaroff =

American science writer and editor

- Born: February 27, 1927
- Died: October 20, 2012 (aged 85); East Hampton, New York
- Education: University of Michigan
- Occupations: Science writer; Editor
- Notable work: The New Genetics: The Human Genome Project and Its Impact on the Practice of Medicine
- Spouse(s): Claire Lynn Fox (1954–1975); Mary K. Moran (1976–2012)
- Children: Peter, Nicholas, Jill, Susan, Jennifer

Leon Morton Jaroff (February 27, 1927 – October 20, 2012) was an American science writer and editor. He is credited with convincing Time Inc. to publish the science-based Discover magazine, of which he was the founding editor. After four years, he left Discover for an editor's position with Time Magazine. Jaroff's medical, scientific, behavioral and environmental stories were featured on Time's cover over 40 times. His 1992 Time cover story "The Iceman's Secrets: the discovery of a frozen Stone Age man yields new clues about life in 3300 B.C." ranked second in overall sales for that year. Jaroff also wrote The New Genetics: The Human Genome Project and Its Impact on the Practice of Medicine.

== Background ==
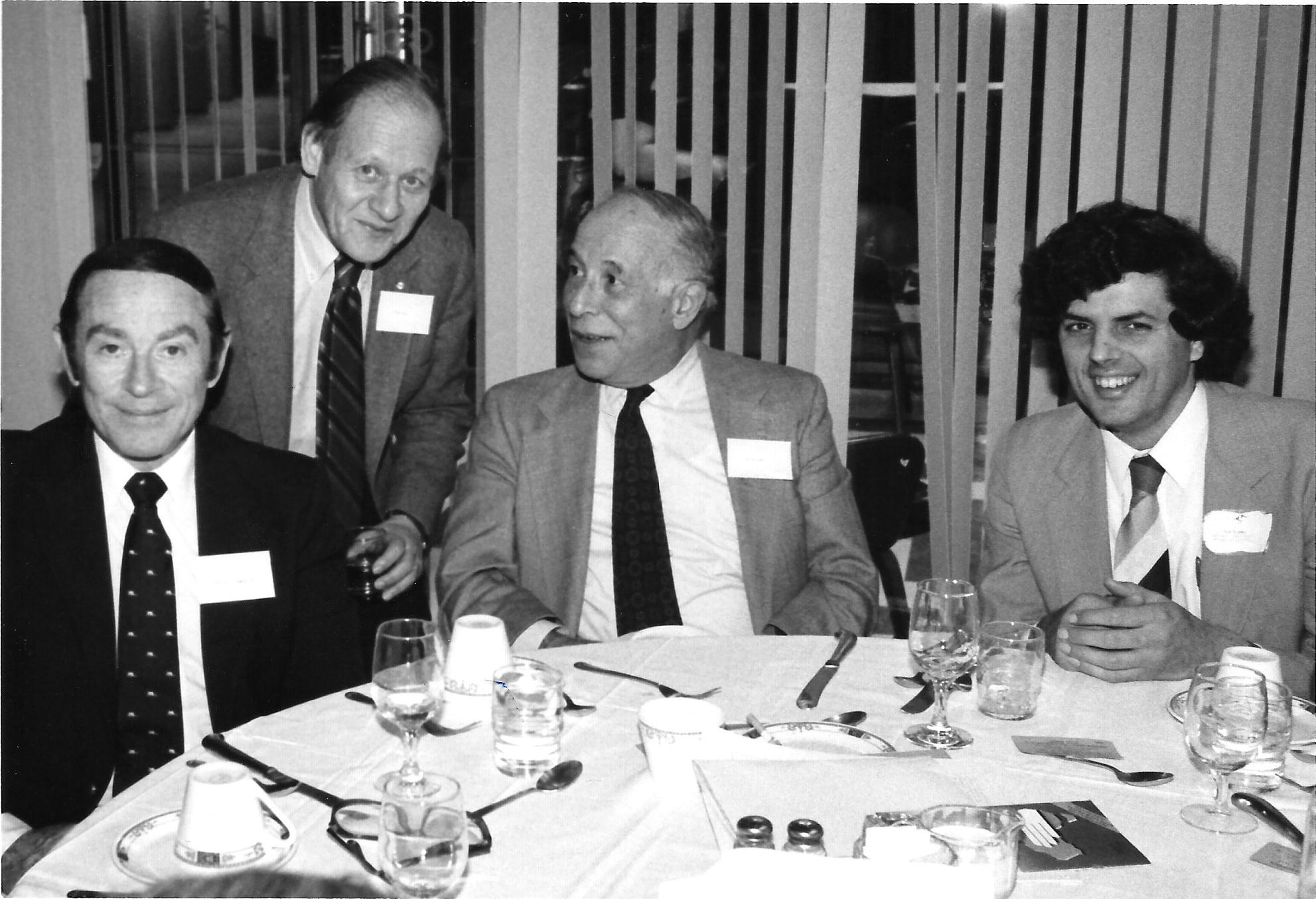
Stanford 1984 CSICOP Conference. Left to right are Leon Jaroff, Paul Kurtz, Philip Klass and Mark Plummer

Jaroff was born February 27, 1927, the son of Abraham and Ruth (Rockita) Jaroff. His interest in journalism started at Central High School in Detroit, Michigan where he wrote a humor column for the school newspaper called "Rambling at Random".

He married Claire Lynn Fox in 1954 and had two sons and three daughters: Peter, Nicholas, Jill, Susan, Jennifer. The marriage ended in divorce in 1975.

His marriage, in 1976, to Mary K. Moran lasted until his death in 2012.

Jaroff attended the University of Michigan where he studied electrical engineering and mechanics. He graduated with a Bachelor of Science degree in 1950. While attending the university, Jaroff worked on the school newspaper, the Michigan Daily, as managing editor.

During World War II, Jaroff served as an electronic technician's mate from 1944 to 1945 in the U.S. Navy.

Jaroff died October 20, 2012, in East Hampton, New York. A memorial gathering in honor of Jaroff was held November 29, 2012, at the Time-Life Building in New York City.

== Career ==
After graduation, Jaroff took a job at the engineering magazine, Materials and Methods, but didn't like it and left after six months. In 1951, Jaroff became an editorial trainee for Life magazine. He worked as a reporter and correspondent for the magazine until 1958. In 1954, he began writing for Time magazine and was hired as the magazine's chief science editor by 1966. Throughout his career at the magazine, Jaroff's stories were featured on the cover more than 40 times. He left his post as correspondent and senior editor in 1979.

In 1971, Jaroff approached Time, Inc. about starting a science magazine for the first time. It took until 1980 for Time Inc. to agree to publish a science-based magazine, which they called Discover. Jaroff described Discover as "more like a Time magazine of the sciences," featuring people in science, as well as book reviews and critiques of science- or pseudoscience-themed movies and television shows. He became the magazine's founding editor, increasing its circulation from about 400,000 readers to 935,000.

While at Discover magazine, Jaroff began writing the column Skeptical Eye and covered topics involving creationism, astrology, extrasensory perception, UFOs, alternative medicine, and topical issues in health care such as homeopathy, vaccinations, and repressed memory syndrome. The Skeptical Eye column was discontinued shortly after Jaroff left. However, 17 years later, Time reinstated the column when Jaroff agreed to write an article about alternative medicine that drew attention from its readership.

"While I have written about politics, business, labor, and sports, my primary interest has been to convey news about new developments in science, medicine, and technology in language the intelligent layperson can understand."

— Leon Jaroff

Jaroff left Discover when the magazine expanded its articles to include psychology and psychiatry, which Jaroff did not think were "very solid sciences." He resigned his position in 1984 and returned to Time as its sciences editor in 1985.

Jaroff took early retirement in 1987, but continued to write under contract. This allowed him to write from home, travel, and do some reporting. He continued to write cover stories for Time, some of them controversial. "The magazine loves me because I generate a lot of hate mail when I knock conspiracy theories and irrational thought," he told David Rochelson in a Teen Ink interview. He described "bashing the irrational" as his "real hobby." Jaroff was also an outspoken critic of Ralph Nader's 2000 presidential campaign, the Committee for Peace in Israel and Palestine, and the anti-nuclear organization Standing for Truth about Radiation, and wrote letters to local newspapers. "Basically, whenever I see something totally irrational in the local press," he said, "I write a letter trying to keep things sane out here, because otherwise the nuts would take over."

"I don't regret for a minute having gone into journalism. It's not as remunerative as almost anything else, but my experiences include having dinner with the King and Queen of Greece, interviewing Dwight D. Eisenhower, traveling with Jack Kennedy during the 1960 primary and the election campaign, spending time with Mayor Daly in Chicago, and meeting George Romney, the Governor of Michigan and former head of American Voters who was really not qualified to be governor of Michigan, much less President of the United States, for which he was being touted for a while. Dealing with some of the real famous scientists, the Nobel Laureates, James Van Allen, who discovered the Van Allen radiation belt, I've seen him a couple times, and we've been friends ever since. So that's been very exciting. Journalism makes you parasitic in a way, because you're reporting mostly on other peoples' achievements and tragedies. But I can't think of anything that could have been more interesting."

— Leon Jaroff

== Science and skepticism ==
=== Space exploration ===
Jaroff often wrote about space. He covered topics such as the power of the Sun, the Mars probes, and even alien abduction, but he counted as one of his most exciting projects a cover story about the Apollo 11 Moon landing. "Neil Armstrong stepped out on the moon and made a statement, and we were out the next week with a picture of him on the cover in a spacesuit, carrying an American flag. That was very exciting."

He also wrote and lectured about the potential risk of asteroids hitting the Earth. He supported the idea of providing funding for astronomers to research asteroid impact avoidance. Because of Jaroff's advocacy in this area, the International Astronomical Union named an asteroid after him.

"It's 7829 Jaroff, five or six miles across and, just like me, it presents no immediate threat. I guess the thing that has meant the most has been having that asteroid named for me, because when I'm long gone, my grandchildren will know about that"

— Leon Jaroff

=== CSICOP ===
Jaroff was among the founding members of the Committee for Scientific Investigation of Claims of the Paranormal (CSICOP), now known as the Committee for Skeptical Inquiry (CSI). Along with Stephen Jay Gould, Leon Lederman, Steve Allen, Chris Carter, James Randi and Milton Rosenberg, Jaroff presented a talk at the June, 1996 World Skeptics Congress hosted by the CSICOP.

At a meeting of the executive council of CSI in Denver, Colorado, in April 2011, Jaroff was selected for inclusion in CSI's Pantheon of Skeptics. The Pantheon of Skeptics was created by CSI to remember the legacy of deceased fellows of CSI and their contributions to the cause of scientific skepticism.

=== Paranormal and psychics ===
In 1988, Jaroff wrote an article for Time called "Fighting Against Flim Flam." The article featured magician James Randi and his ability to set up double-blind experiments and, through his understanding of the art of deception, expose "psychics, astrologers, spiritualists, channelers, faith healers, and a host of mystics and charlatans". Jaroff had been investigating Uri Geller, a man who claimed to be able to project energy "by sheer mind power" and "cause an electron beam to be diverted, cause objects to levitate, and cause metallic objects to bend." Even after Geller was exposed as a fraud by professors from Hebrew University of Jerusalem, Jaroff observed that Geller's popularity in the United States had continued to rise. He said in an interview for Teen Ink, "I wrote a story in Time describing all this, and the last line was, 'At week's end, it appeared that the prestigious Stanford Research Institute had been hoodwinked by a discredited Israeli nightclub magician.'"

Both Jaroff and Randi were present during a session by Geller in which he attempted to demonstrate his powers to Time editors. After the session, Randi replicated Geller's alleged superpowers using magic tricks. Jaroff later worked with Randi for stories covered in Discover magazine because of his ability to set up double-blind experiments that reveal deception and fraud. Of Geller, Jaroff said, "I think Uri Geller is a very skilled magician. I don't think he has any paranormal powers."

In March 2001, Jaroff's article "Talking to the Dead" was published in Time magazine. The article featured John Edward, who was popular at the time for his television program Crossing Over with John Edward, and raised suspicions about Edward's use of both cold reading and hot reading techniques to glean information from participants. Jaroff wrote "It's a sophisticated form of the game Twenty Questions, during which the subject, anxious to hear from the dead, seldom realizes that he, not the medium or the departed, is supplying the answers." The article also featured Michael O'Neill, a New York City marketing manager, who had attended the show, but noticed discrepancies in his experience when the show was edited for television, claiming that Edward's questions and O'Neill's answers were deliberately mismatched. Jaroff reported in the article that he tried contacting Edward, but was told by Edward's handlers that he would not respond to criticism.

On March 6, 2001, Jaroff, along with Edward, James Van Praagh, Sylvia Browne, Paul Kurtz, and Rabbi Shmuley Boteach appeared on Larry King Live to discuss the article. Edward claimed the details of the article were completely wrong, and indicated that if Jaroff had simply asked, he could have cleared up any misunderstandings. Edward admitted the show was edited for time but not content. Jaroff reiterated that he had attempted to talk with Edward directly, but was denied access. When asked directly whether Jaroff thought Edward and people like him are frauds, he responded by saying, "Yes. I'm willing to say two things. One, I think they're very good at what they do, but I think what they do is baloney."

=== Vaccines and homeopathy ===
One of the first articles Jaroff wrote when he restarted Skeptical Eye was devoted to vaccinations. He was a critic of the "anti-vaccination folks". Time published an article in 1999, co-authored by Jaroff, Ann Blackman, Jeanne McDowell and Alice Park, called Vaccine Jitters. The article focused on the need and safety of vaccines in the United States, as well as the risks involved with the practice.

"What happened to the quarantine notices that were once routinely posted on houses afflicted by measles, mumps or whooping cough? Or the long rows of iron lungs filled with polio victims unable to breathe on their own? Why do words diphtheria and scarlet fever draw only blank stares from today's kids? Because of vaccines, that's why."

— Leon Jaroff

On May 17, 1999, Jaroff wrote an article for Time magazine titled "Homeopathic E-mail" in which he and his co-authors, Michael Brunton and Bruce Crumley, discussed French biologist Jacques Benveniste's assertion that "the memory of water in a homeopathic solution has an electromagnetic signature." Benveniste had, purportedly, developed a mechanism using copper coils to "activate" water (endowing it with homeopathic characteristics), record its "electromagnetic signature", and transmit it across the Internet with the intent to make homeopathic any water in any place in the world. The article aligned itself with suggestions by physicists Brian Josephson and Robert Park that Beneviste's assertions be challenged in a randomized, double-blind test. While Beneviste allegedly agreed to such testing in 1999, he died five years later without taking action.

== Book ==
The New Genetics: The Human Genome Project and Its Impact on the Practice of Medicine (Whittle Direct Books, 1991) ISBN 978-0-962-47457-6

== Select articles and cover stories ==
- Stop the germ! Rapid-fire discoveries are revealing how the body's immune system endlessly fights of disease--and occasionally goes awry (with Madeleine J. Nash, Dick Thompson and Suzanne Wymelenberg) (Time, May 23, 1988)
- The Gene Hunt: Scientists launch a $3 billion project to map the chromosomes and decipher the complete instructions for making a human being (with Madeleine J. Nash and Dick Thompson) (Time, March 20, 1989)
- Onward to Mars: A dramatic launch heralds a new era of missions to the Red Planet (with Glenn Garelik, Madeleine J. Nash and Richard Woodbury) (Time (July 18, 1988)
- The magic is back! On a thundering pillar of fire, Discovery carries the nation's hopes aloft again (with Glenn Garelik, Jerry Hannifin and Richard Woodbury) (Time, October 10, 1988)
- Fury on the Sun: Once worshiped as a god, earth's star is revealing the secrets of its awesome power (with Madeleine J. Nash) (Time, July 3, 1989)
- Iceman (with William Rademaekers) (Time, October 26, 1992)
- Brave New Babies: In three landmark experiments involving gene therapy, doctors try to cure a rare hereditary disease (The WSFA Journal, May 1993)
- Phony arkaeology (Time, July 5, 1993)
- Lies of the mind (Time, November 29, 1993)
- Happy Birthday Double Helix: Forty years after their discovery of DNA's secret, Watson and Crick celebrate its impact on the world (The WSFA Journal, July 1993)
- Counterattack: How drugmakers are fighting back (with Lawrence Mondi) (Time, September 12, 1994)
- Smart's the word in Detroit (Time, February 6, 1995)
- Listening for aliens (with David Bjerklie) (Time, February 5, 1996)
- The man's cancer (Time, April 1, 1996)
- A shot across the Earth's bow (with Dan Cray) (Time, June 3, 1996)
- Did aliens really land? (with James Willwerth) (Time, June 23, 1997)
- The last time we saw Mars (Time, July 14, 1997)
- Fixing the Genes (with Alice Park) (Time, January 11, 1999)
- Vaccine Jitters (with Ann Blackman, Jeanne McDowell and Alice Park) (Time, September 13, 1999)
- What will happen to alternative medicine? (Time, November 8, 1999)
- Will a killer asteroid hit the earth? (Time, April 10, 2000)
- How I Won the Michigan-Minnesota Game (Time, September 13, 2003)

== Memberships ==
- American Association for the Advancement of Science Fellow
- American Institute of Physics Member of the publication committee
- Committee for the Scientific Investigation of Claims of the Paranormal Fellow
- Neuroscience Research Foundation Trustee
- Rogosin Institute Board Member

== Awards and honors ==
- 1989 Excellence Award for the Aviation Space Writers Association
- American Association for the Advancement of Science, science writing award
- American Institute of Physics, science writing award
- In 1984 the Committee for Skeptical Inquiry (CSICOP) presented Jaroff with the Responsibility in Journalism award for being the managing editor of Discover magazine and establishing the Skeptical Eye column. Philip Klass stated that Jaroff has "'political courage'" for his column that offers "useful perspectives... of claims of the paranormal".
- Asteroid 7829 Jaroff, discovered by Eleanor Helin at Palomar in 1992, was named his honor. The official naming citation was published by the Minor Planet Center on August 8, 1998 (M.P.C. 32349).
