= Benjamin Wolozin =

American pharmacologist and neurologist

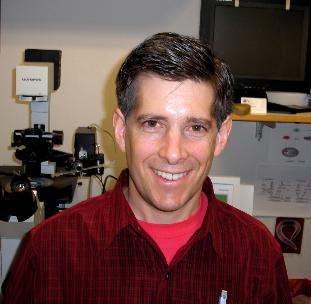
- Wolozin in 2006
- Born: 1959
- Education: Wesleyan University (BA); Albert Einstein College of Medicine (MD) (PhD)
- Scientific career
- Fields: Pharmacology, Neurology
- Workplaces: Boston University Chobanian & Avedisian School of Medicine (Department of Pharmocology)

Benjamin Wolozin is an American pharmacologist and neurologist currently at Boston University School of Medicine. He is also an Elected Fellow of the American Association for the Advancement of Science.

== Education ==
Wolozin received his B.A. from Wesleyan University (Middletown, CT) in 1980 and his M.D., Ph.D. from the Albert Einstein College of Medicine in 1988. His graduate work at Albert Einstein College of Medicine was done in the laboratory of Peter Davies. His trainees have positions throughout academia, industry and non-profits.

== Career ==
He is currently a professor of Anatomy and Neurobiology, Neurology, Pharmacology/Physiology and Biophysics, and the Program in Neuroscience at Boston University School of Medicine. Wolozin is a member of Evans Center for Interdisciplinary Biomedical Research and Genome Science Institute in Boston University. He is also co-founder and Chief Scientific Officer (CSO) of Aquinnah Pharmaceuticals Inc., a biotechnology company developing novel therapeutics to treat Alzheimer's disease, and Amyotrophic Lateral Sclerosis.

== Honours ==
Wolozin has published over 150 papers, including publications in Science, Nature, and PNAS. He has been elected as a fellow of the AAAS, the Spivack Distinguished Scholar in Neuroscience Award (BU), the Zenith Award (Alzheimer Association), Collaborator of the Year (BU Evans Center), Fellow of the Society for Skeptical Inquiry, Teacher of the year (Loyola University), A.E. Bennett Award (Soc. For Biological Psychiatry), Commissioned Officer Commendation Award (PHS), Donald B. Linsdley Award (Soc. For Neuroscience), Medical Scientist Training Fellowship, NSF Fellowship (declined), Hawk Prize for Biochemical Research (Wesleyan), Departmental Honors and Magna Cum Laude Latin honors (Wesleyan University).

== Works ==
Wolozin investigates the pathophysiology of neurodegenerative diseases, including Alzheimer's disease and related dementias, Parkinson's disease and Amyotrophic Lateral Sclerosis. Wolozin's contributions to understanding of neurodegenerative disease cover a wide range of subjects. In 1986 he identified the antibody Alz-50, which was one of the first antibodies to identify the conformation specific epitopes of microtubule associated protein tau that are abundant in the brains of patients with Alzheimer's disease. In 2000 he was the first scientist to show that individuals taking statins (a form of cholesterol lowering medication) exhibit much lower rates of Alzheimer's disease. In 2010 he demonstrated that ALS pathology is associated with a type of biomolecular condensate, termed "stress granules". In 2012 he demonstrated that pathology associated with microtubule associated protein tau also co-localizes with biomolecular condensates.

== Stress granules and neurodegenerative diseases ==
Wolozin's research largely focuses on the role of RNA binding proteins and stress granules in neurodegenerative diseases. RNA binding proteins contain domains that have only a few types of amino acids; these domains are termed "low complexity domains" and have a strong tendency to aggregate. A highly unusual and important aspect of these proteins is that they use reversible aggregation as normal biological mechanism to sequester RNA transcripts. RNA binding proteins form a variety of cellular aggregates including stress granules, transport granules, P-bodies and nuclear speckles. In 2010 Wolozin's group produced research suggesting that dysfunction of the stress granule pathway contributes to the pathophysiology of amyotrophic lateral sclerosis. Multiple subsequent studies have corroborated the contributions of RNA-binding proteins (RBPs), stress granules and translational regulation in the pathophysiology of neurodegenerative disease. This work prompted the concept that "regulated protein aggregation", which provides a theoretical framework for understanding the biology of neurodegenerative disease, including Alzheimer's disease and Amyotrophic Lateral Sclerosis. The cell controls the location and disposition of RNA through the binding of RNA-binding proteins; these RNA binding proteins consolidate to form RNA granules through reversible aggregation of their low complexity domains. Recently, the biophysics of RNA granule formation has been shown to fall under the aegis of a general property, termed liquid liquid phase separation (LLPS). LLPS occurs when RNA binding proteins associate to form structures analogous to liquid droplets, which separate from surrounding aqueous medium.

The Wolozin laboratory extended this work to explain the pathophysiology of Alzheimer's disease Work from the Wolozin laboratory demonstrates that the pathology occurring in neurons (neurofibrillary tangles) is associated with RNA binding proteins. This occurs in part because tau (the main building block of neurofibrillary tangles) stimulates stress granule formation. The link between Tau and stress granules is mediated by the RNA binding protein hnRNPA2B1, which binds tau as well as recognizes a form of methylated RNA, termed N^{6}-methyl-adenosine (m^{6}A). Stress granules also stimulate tau pathology, leading to the hypothesis that Alzheimer's disease occurs in part because of a hyperactive stress granule response stimulated by chronic diseases and/or genetic changes, which results in abundant tau pathology and subsequent neurodegeneration.

The stress granule/LLPS hypothesis is important because it identifies new directions for therapeutic intervention for tauopathies and other neurodegenerative diseases. Wolozin has developed methods to analyze the pathological RNA granules and stress granules that accumulate in brain diseases. He has also developed a series of compounds that potently and effectively inhibit TDP-43 aggregation in multiple neuronal models. In 2014, Wolozin combined forces with Glenn Larsen to co-found the biotechnology company, Aquinnah Pharmaceuticals.

== Oath of the Scientist ==
Wolozin co-authored the scientists' pledge with Katya Ravid. The pledge provides the equivalent for scientists of the Hippocratic Oath and is recited at graduation at some schools.
