= William V. Mayer =

American educator (1920–1989)

William V. Mayer (March 25, 1920 – June 30, 1989) was an American educator.

== Career ==
He got his A.B. in zoology from the University of California and his Ph.D. in biology at Stanford University. During his long teaching career he taught at Stanford University, Wayne State University, the University of Southern California, and the University of Colorado, Boulder. He was a member of the National Association of Biology Teachers (NABT) from 1966 to 1989 and served as its president in 1967.

Mayer's central interest was education reform and he worked for national coordination of goals in the teaching of biology. From 1965 to 1982 he was director of the Biological Sciences Curriculum Study (BSCS). While at BSCS he frequently clashed with creationists in his campaign to promote excellence and integrity in science education. In 1981 he served as a consultant and witness in the landmark Arkansas creation case McLean v. Arkansas.

Mayer was a member of The Committee for Skeptical Inquiry (CSI), and in April 2011 CSI honored him by including him in its newly created Pantheon of Skeptics.

He was the editor of Bookwatch Reviews published by the National Center for Science Education.

== Works ==
- 1973: The Vicious Circle Journal of Biological Education, vol 7, issue 5, 1973, pp. 29–32
- 1978: Biology teacher's handbook Biological Sciences Curriculum Study, Wiley, October, 1978, ISBN 0471019453
- 1985: Biological Science: A Molecular Approach by William V. Mayer, Don E. Meyer & Richard R. Tolman, D C Heath & Co, November 1985, ISBN 0669067695
- 1988: Reading beyond the textbook: Great books of biology, with Jack L. Carter, BioScience, vol 38, no 7, August 1, 1988, pp. 490–492,
