= Katya Ravid =

- Education: B.Sc. Israel Institute of Technology; Ph.D. Israel Institute of Technology; Doctoral Israel Institute of Technology; Postdoctoral Boston University
- Occupations: Biochemistry and Cell Biology professor
- Title: The inaugural incumbent of the Barbara E. Corkey Professor of Medicine of Boston University

Katya Ravid is a Biochemistry and Cell Biology professor at Boston University Chobanian & Avedisian School of Medicine. Ravid received her Bachelor of Science, PhD, and doctoral degree from the Israel Institute of Technology. She then received her postdoctoral at the Massachusetts Institute of Technology. As of 2021, she has been the inaugural incumbent of the Barbara E. Corkey Professor of Medicine of Boston University. She's a member of the Boston University's Whitaker Cardiovascular Institute and the Boston University-Boston Medical Center (BU-BMC) Cancer Center.

As a researcher in the fields of biochemistry and oncology, Ravid's research is focused on the study of blood platelets, adenosine receptors, and megakaryocytes to aid cancer patients. Her research allowed her to obtain multiple grants and become the founder of different programs for Boston University.

== Career ==
Boston University has recognized Ravid as being "nationally and internationally recognized" for her discoveries, extensive research, and association to other programs. Under the university's announcement for title as the inaugural incumbent of the Barbara E. Corkey Professor of Medicine, one of the discoveries she was acclaimed for was her discovery of unique transcriptional signature that dictate how platelet lineage undergoes specification early in her career.

Alongside her title of the inaugural incumbent of the Barbara E. Corkey Professor, she also became the founding director of the Evans Center for Interdisciplinary Biomedical Research in 2009. The Evans Center for Interdisciplinary Biomedical Research is affiliated with the Evans Medical Foundation (founded in 1975) and the Department of Medicine at the Boston Medical Center (formally the Evans Department of Medicine). The Evans Center for Interdisciplinary Biomedical Research's goal is to establish a center in which faculty from the Department of Medicine and other schools can collaborate to promote biomedical research and education.

Ravid is also the director for Boston University Interdisciplinary Biomedical Research Office (IBRO) that is funded by the Boston University's Office of Research and the Department of Medicine. Launched in 2015, the office seeks to foster and support different biomedical research programs in collaboration with faculty and other members of Boston University's medical center and the Charles River campuses (such as the Clinical Translational Science Institute).

She held the title of president for the Massachusetts Academy of Sciences (MAS) from 2018 to 2022.

She has been a reporter/researcher for the National Institute of Health (NIH) since 2018.

As an awardee of the American Heart Association's Strategically Focused Research Network Award since 2021, she has received extensive funding and support from the association for her lab. She is the co-director of a lab focused on cancer-associated thromboembolism as affected by health disparities in collaboration with the American Heart Association. Her lab is one of three to have received the Strategically Focused Research Network Award to search for disparities in cardio oncology. The other labs that received the award are found at the University of Pennsylvania, Augusta University, and the Medical College of Wisconsin. Funding for these labs is planned to continue being provided until July 2025.

News sources have highlighted Ravid's work for making new findings in the field of oncology. In 2021, Boston University's newspaper, The Brink, wrote about her research findings on the linkage between black cancer patients and their higher susceptibility to blood clots. This was one of the findings in the lab funded by the American Heart Association. In 2021, The American Association for the Advancement of Science's newsletter, EurekaAlert!, credited Dr. Ravid for her research and discovery of two drugs, PXS-LOX_1 and PXS-LOX_2, which can slow down the development of bone marrow cancer called primary myelofibrosis (PMF). EurekaAlert! stated that "these drugs are unique because they are able to inhibit their target, a protein called lysyl oxidase, with a combination of specificity and potency not seen in previously tested drugs."

== Honors and awards ==
2000-2005: She was awarded the Established Investigator Award by the American Heart Association.

2011-2019: She was a vice chair and key speaker for the Gordon Research Conference in 2011, 2013, 2015, and 2019. Primarily for the cell biology of megakaryocytes and platelets section of the conference.

2014: She was elected as a fellow of the American Association for the Advancement of Science.

2016: She was awarded the Fulbright Scholar Award and is the first biomedical researcher at Boston University to receive this award because of their extensive research on hematopoiesis and megakaryocytes.

2019: She became a named member of the magazine, The American Society for Biochemistry and Molecular Biology.
