= Extension 720 =

Extension 720 was a long-format interview program on WGN Radio. It ran for 39 years before being terminated in December 2012. Although the show originated with multiple people, hosting duties turned primarily to Milton J. Rosenberg. As a result of his work on the program, Rosenberg was awarded the National Humanities Medal in 2008 by President George W. Bush, "for bringing the world of ideas to millions of listeners."
