= Barry Karr =

American magazine editor

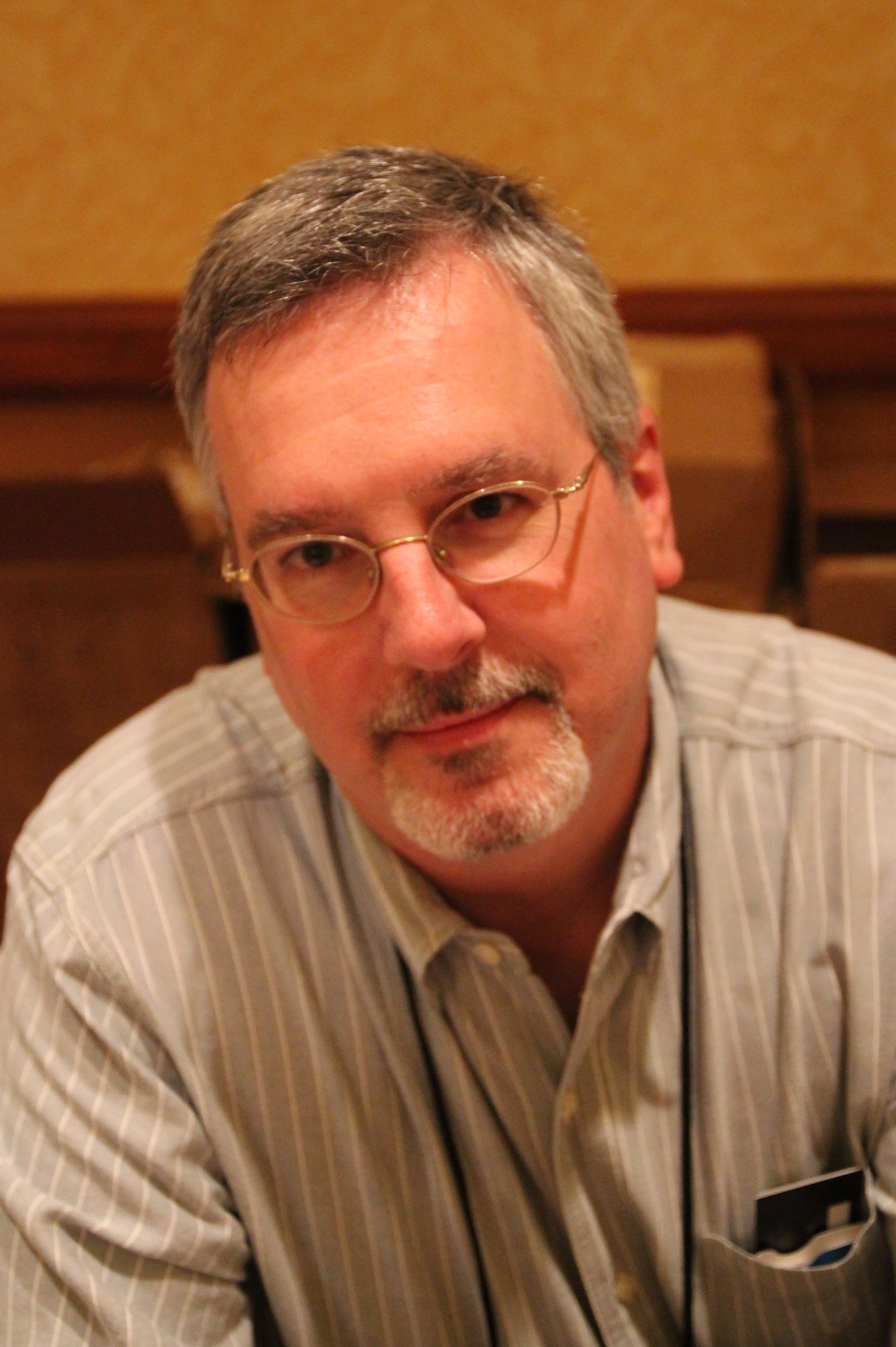
- Born: New York, U.S.
- Education: University at Buffalo (B.A.)
- Occupations: Executive Director Committee for Skeptical Inquiry and CFO of Center for Inquiry

Barry Karr is an American skeptic and paranormal researcher, for more than three decades (until retiring in June 2025) the executive director of the Committee for Skeptical Inquiry. He has been consulted by the media on the paranormal. Karr has been involved in many investigations including faith healing, UFOs, firewalking, ghosts and others. He is a published author in two anthology publications, and as an editor of two others. Karr is a proponent of scientific skepticism and a Fellow of the Committee for Skeptical Inquiry.

== Early life ==
His parents are Angelina and Leo Karr of Arkport, New York. His mother taught speech therapy for five years in Scio, New York, before becoming an elementary school teacher at North Hornell School in Arkport. She was on the school board from 1973 to 1988 and was active on the New York State School Boards Association and president of the Steuben County School Boards Association. Both parents were members of the American Legion. Karr and his four siblings went through the Arkport school system.

== Career with CSICOP ==
Karr began by stuffing envelopes part-time at Committee for Skeptical Inquiry during his second year in college, and he was hired in their fifth year. After graduation from University at Buffalo with a political science degree, Paul Kurtz hired Karr full-time as the assistant public relations director. In 2012, Karr was awarded for his 25 years of service and recognized as honorary Trenches winner at the Skeptic's Toolbox. He has been involved in many investigations including remote viewing, ghost hunting, firewalking, UFOs, Satanism and faith healing.

He has said, "People are looking for the mystical. It's exciting and fun". As far as proving or disproving God, Karr was said in an interview, "CSICOP takes no formal stance on the existence of God... some members are skeptical." Karr feels that holding a belief in the supernatural and superstition can "detract from the advancement of the human race". People want to make decisions rationally but to do that they need to be aware of science and technology, that does not mix with the supernatural. "We believe before you jump into the realm of the paranormal... you should explore some of the rational alternatives."

Karr feels that "newspapers are in the business to sell newspapers, and people love a mystery". He has become worried that "mainstream media had fallen into the mode of hype now, explain later", and has often been asked to test claims of weeping statues but states that "such claims are denied by the churches involved. I think they want people to believe some kind of miracle is going on, I don't think they wanted to hear the truth."

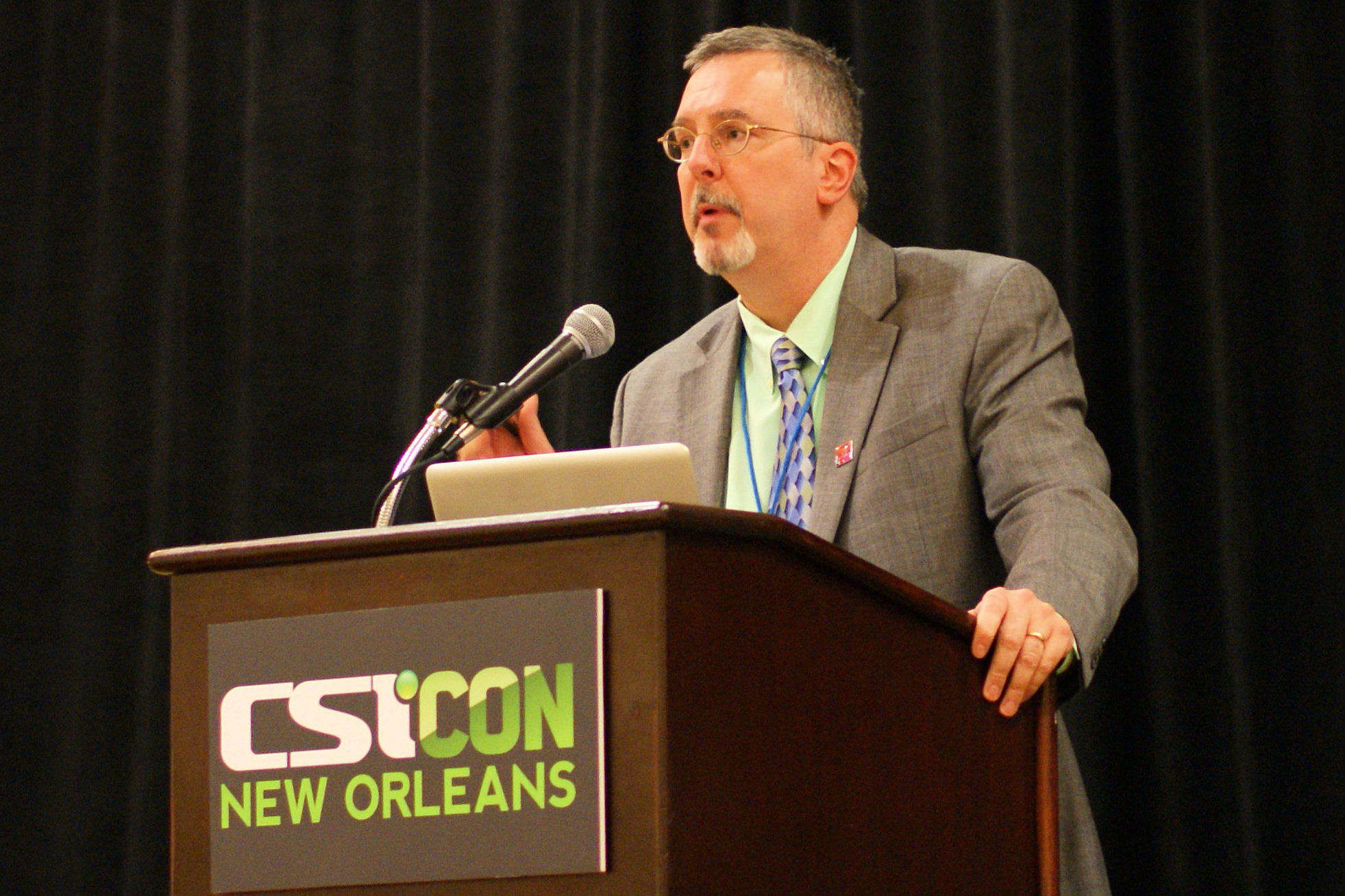
Barry Karr, Executive Director of the Committee for Skeptical Inquiry, at CSICon 2011 in New Orleans

In May 2025 Karr announced his retirement from CSI effective at the end of June, after more than 40 years. He was succeeded by Stephen Hupp.

== Faith healing ==
As a part of his work with CSICOP, Karr attended many revival meetings to investigate "faith healers" such as Peter Popoff, Charles Hunter (The Happy Hunters), Willard Fuller and W. V. Grant. During one event, Karr pretended to have back problems and limped to his seat heavily leaning on a cane. Popoff came down the aisle and asked Karr to throw away his cane and "run around" which Karr proceeded to do. The couple next to Karr had brought a severely disabled baby to be cured by the faith-healer (who ignored them throughout the revival); the parents wanted to know why God had "healed" Karr and not their baby. Karr explained that he did not have back problems and could walk fine before the healing. The parents were devastated, as if a miracle had been wasted on someone "who didn't even deserve it".

According to Karr, the Committee for the Scientific Examination of Religion sent investigators to Popoff's faith healing sessions in Houston and San Francisco. One person moved close enough to see a receiver in Popoff's ear. The investigations led by James Randi used more than $20,000 worth of scanning equipment and "were able to intercept the frequency and tune in to what was being said". They discovered that Popoff was being fed information by his wife who was using hot-reading based on cards that people had filled out when they arrived at the faith healing event. Karr said that when confronted, Popoff first denied it, then later said "that people were aware of it" and "now admits to using the transmitter, saying it is the 'age of television'". Karr said that one member of the Bay Area Skeptics, Don Henvick, "has been healed five times by Popoff. Once was in Detroit when dressed as a woman, he was healed of uterine cancer."

During a documentary on the Happy Hunter faith-healer husband and wife team, Karr interviewed people who had attended a service. One woman who was unable to walk believed she was not healed because "Maybe I'm not entitled to it". Karr discovered that the faith-healers always appear successful, sometimes people will feel a little better after being healed and if they do not, then it is not attributed to the preacher or to God but because their faith is not strong enough, or because God does not want to heal them.

== Investigations in China ==
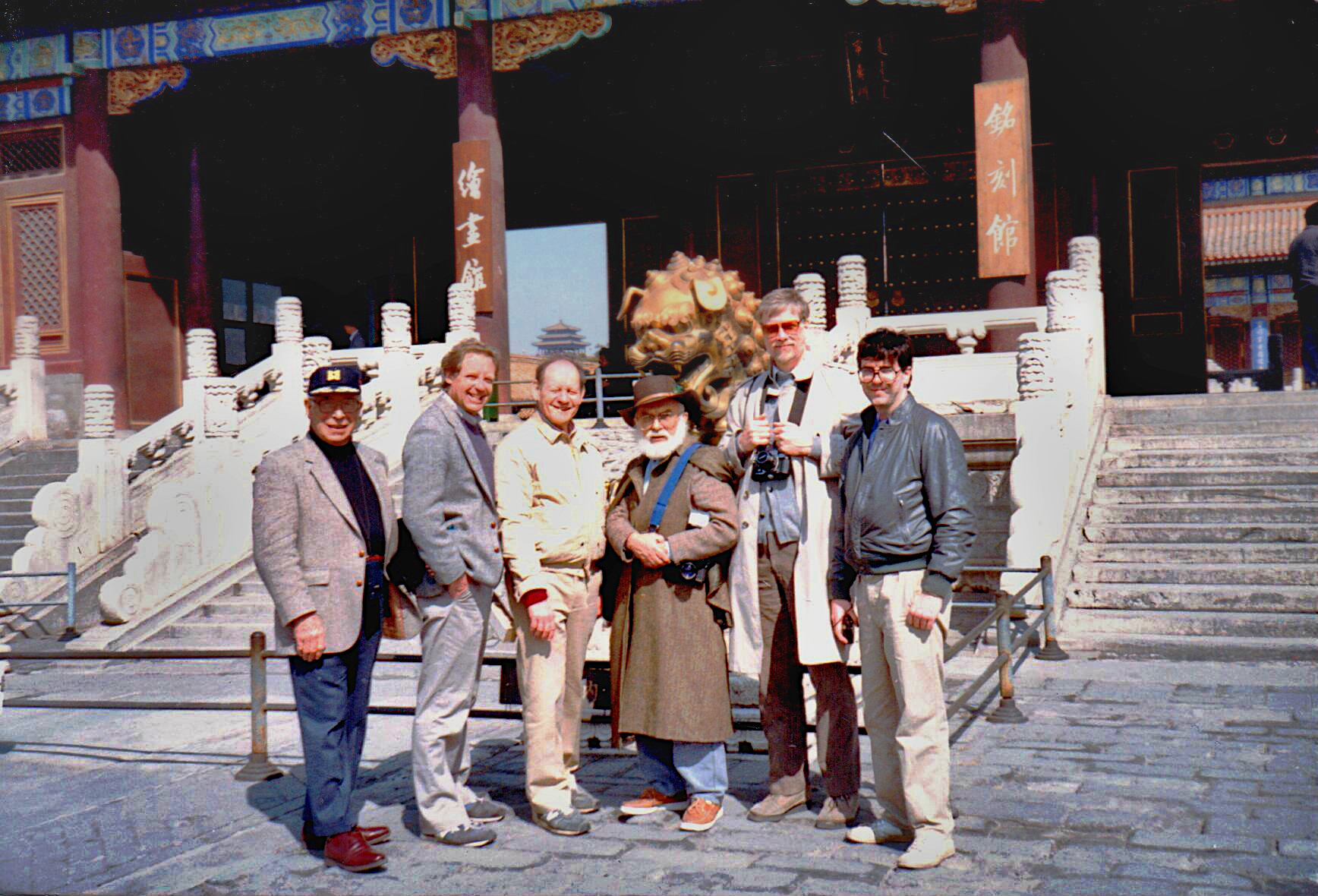
CSICOP visits China in 1988, at the Forbidden City. From left to right are Phil Klass, Kendrick Frazier, Paul Kurtz, James Randi, James Alcock and Barry Karr.

From March 21 to April 3, 1988, Karr along with other members of CSICOP visited China by invitation of Lin Zixen who was the editor of Science and Technology newspaper in Beijing. Zixen's son had attended Buffalo State University with Karr. Lin Zixen had become concerned about young people's belief in the paranormal in China. The CSICOP committee traveled to Xi'an and Shanhi where they gave lectures answering many questions from "crowds of people" who showed a lot of enthusiasm.

One test was of a qigong master who claimed he could move people from a distance without seeing the subject. To control for the possibility that the subject was moving when viewing the "incantations", the master was placed in a sound-proof room. The committee had the qigong master exercise his powers at "regular intervals depending on the flip of a coin". They discovered that the subject moved when the master did the incantations, and also when he did not. Karr said, "I don't think it's a deliberate deception ... it's a very strong belief system."

In Xi'an and Shanhi, the committee tested children who were reported to be able to see through envelopes and repair broken match sticks without touching them. Karr reports that the powers did not "stand up to scientific scrutiny".

== Other media contact ==
Because of his role as the executive director for Skeptical Inquirer and as a proponent of scientific skepticism, his investigations and the many years working for CSI, the media often asks for his expertise when they are working on a story concerning the paranormal.

Dealing with people who default to the ghost answer has been frustrating to Karr. In 1987, he received a call from a woman who claimed that ghosts turned on her water faucet, looked into her second story window, and then finally threw a Happy Meal across the room. Karr gave her more common scenarios: maybe the 7-year-old son turned the water on and does not want to admit it, the peering ghosts could be reflections of lights from cars or house lights. When questioning her about the flying meal he discovered that the woman had not seen the Happy Meal fly from the top of the refrigerator. No matter what answer he tried to give, she wanted to hear only the ghost answer. He finally told her that as the ghosts had not harmed her or her family, they were unlikely to do so and to call back if anything else happened and he would personally investigate. The moral of the story Karr tells the reporter is that "You can not argue with believers and win. It is best to ask questions, offer alternative viewpoints and let them make their own conclusion."

CSI receives two or three stories of weeping statues or sightings of Jesus or Mary each year. "Claims of miracles are not surprising," says Karr. "Once a story gets out, hits the news, it's really not surprising these things pop up. It creates a bit of a snowball effect. I've got a file an inch thick – Jesus's face on a tortilla, on a soybean in Ohio. There was a tree stump with the Virgin Mary on it. Periodically, there will be pictures of clouds with the Virgin Mary and Jesus in them. My favorite is the face of Elvis in smoke at a rock concert. People see what they want to see." "Last year in Wilkes-Barre (PA) the image of the Virgin Mary was sighted on the side of a house. It turned out to be an image for a street light bounced through a window... It becomes a Rorschach test you can see what you like." "No weeping icon has ever passed muster with the committee."

Asked about psychics he says, "If all we had to do is think about it, crime would have been cleaned up a long time ago." "People get readings when they're troubled, so it's easy for a psychic to say something like, 'Be wary of the man you're seeing because he's going through some changes,' and convince you that she knows all about you... The point at which it becomes harmful or dangerous is if you start to base your decisions on the advice or you can't make a decision until that advice is given." "Clients often strain to connect psychics' general statements with specific incidents in their lives." "The problem parapsychologists face is that science is based on the reproduction of experiments, and so far parapsychologists have been unable to support any of their claims thorough repeatable tests. ... We don't rule out the possibilities, but we think the evidence should be very solid." Concerning newspapers that print psychic predictions for the upcoming year, Karr states that "Their predictions rarely come close to occurring... 1992 was not a very good year for psychics. Then again no year is good for them, every year the media publishes their predictions and every year their predictions are wrong." Asked about a psychic's prediction for Dolly Parton for 1993, Karr answered that he doubted her breast would explode, on stage as predicted or elsewhere.

In 1993, Karr stated that he had been hearing psychics predict that there would be a catastrophic earthquake in the spring. "California has earthquakes all the time. But at some point, there's going to be a big earthquake. And I predict ... the psychics will be crawling out of the woodwork, saying 'See I told you that was going to happen.'"

Voices on EVPs are commonly used as evidence of life after death by most ghost hunters. Karr believes that these recordings are not good evidence and no scientist would accept them as there are too many ways to make noises appear on a recording. The ghost hunters tell you what to listen for, and then that is what you hear. "Plus there is a certain level of expectation." "Don't take it seriously... We have never found any evidence to support the theory that there are ghosts. It's fine for Halloween, but people shouldn't believe (in ghosts) the other 364 days of the year."

Concerning UFOs, he said, "In nearly 50 years of reported UFO sightings, no one has ever produced any scientific credible evidence to show we have alien spaceships in our skies". "Karr theorizes that UFOs and extra-terrestrials are an extension of the folklore handed down over the centuries. 'Elves, leprechauns, and gnomes have been part of dreams as have experiences of visits in the night by spirits. So as our world becomes more technology-driven, our fantasies become more sophisticated. Today, its aliens from another planet. We're not disputing the fact that people see things but so often those things are misperceived or their memory plays tricks on them.'" Karr states that CSICOP is not saying that life does not exist outside Earth, many people do believe that it does. "The question is, are they visiting us?" He goes on to say that he himself hopes "alien life does visit earth. I would love to be there when they arrive". "There is not one artifact that proves the existence of life on other planets". "If they are coming, why do they show up and then disappear?"

One rumor that was investigated by CSI was about the supposed Roswell crash. The rumor was that President Truman had signed an executive order covering it up. According to Karr, they were able to show after looking at documents at the Truman library that the signature was snipped and pasted from unrelated documents. Concerning Area 51, "There are about four or five guys running around the country, and they all have a different shtick about Area 51." He wonders how they can claim to have convincing evidence and still disagree with each other.

In 1984, CSICOP began sending letters to newspapers asking them to carry a disclaimer when printing horoscopes. "Ten years ago you wouldn't have seen any (disclaimers)". In 1993, Karr stated that 60 newspapers were carrying a disclaimer. Most papers state that horoscopes have no scientific fact supporting them and that reading a horoscope is for entertainment only.

Karr feels that the media contributes to belief in the paranormal. By stating that strange things happen on a full Moon with people and animals acting oddly, with no evidence that anything odd is occurring. Karr says that Skeptical Inquirer has investigated that claim many times. "It may seem [like] full moons spur weird occurrences... research indicates otherwise" many surveys have shown that there is no change in homicide rates to support that claim.

Interviewed by The Oregonian, Karr related that one of the successes of CSI had been an investigation into seminars led by self-help gurus claiming they can firewalk because of their mental skills. The investigation showed that people who had not taken the course were also able to walk on the hot coals. Anyone who walks over the coals quickly will not have burned feet. "The only people getting burned were the poor suckers paying upwards of $300." "The coals on which self-help gurus walked aren't good heat conductors, I'd like to see these people try to walk over hot frying pans, which are."

He says that urban legends "fulfill society's demand for gossip and rumor, reinforce or validate beliefs and inspire talking about shared unexplainable experiences. And since they reveal taboos and obsessions, Karr said American urban legends tend to be about death, cars, hygiene or money."

According to Karr, "People worry more than necessary about 'signs' of Satanism". "A town will find a dead animal in a junkyard and go into hysteria."

he says that "The notion of Harmonic Convergence is a beautiful idea, the joining together of multitudes of people, all concentrating on the very noble desire for peace and harmony. On another level, it can be quite disturbing when you realize... these people have given up on the real world." "People have to accomplish things. They can't wait for a universal energy force."

On the 1994 world ending prediction by Harold Camping, he said, "I'm not going to worry about it. It can't happen – I scheduled a meeting for that Wednesday, and it's important that I be there."

Karr feels that crop circles are "man-made things that caught on like Hula Hoops or Pet Rocks and got kind of a life of their own... like any other fad, it'll die out eventually".

== Publications ==
- Barry Karr, "Never a Dull Moment" in Paul Kurtz, Skeptical Odysseys: Personal Accounts by the World's Leading Paranormal Inquirers. Prometheus Books, 2001, pp. 47–56. ISBN 1573928844.
- Joe Nickell, Barry Karr, Tom Genoni, The Outer Edge: Classic Investigations of the Paranormal, Committee for the Scientific Investigation of Claims of the Paranormal Inc, 1996
- Kendrick Frazier, Joe Nickell, Barry Karr (editors), The UFO Invasion: The Roswell Incident, Alien Abductions & Government Coverups, Prometheus Books (Amherst, New York), 1997 ISBN 1573921319.
- Ranjit Sandhu, Paul Kurtz, Barry Karr (editors),Science and Religion: Are They Compatible?, Prometheus Books, 2003 ISBN 1591020646
