= Stephen Doig =

American journalist

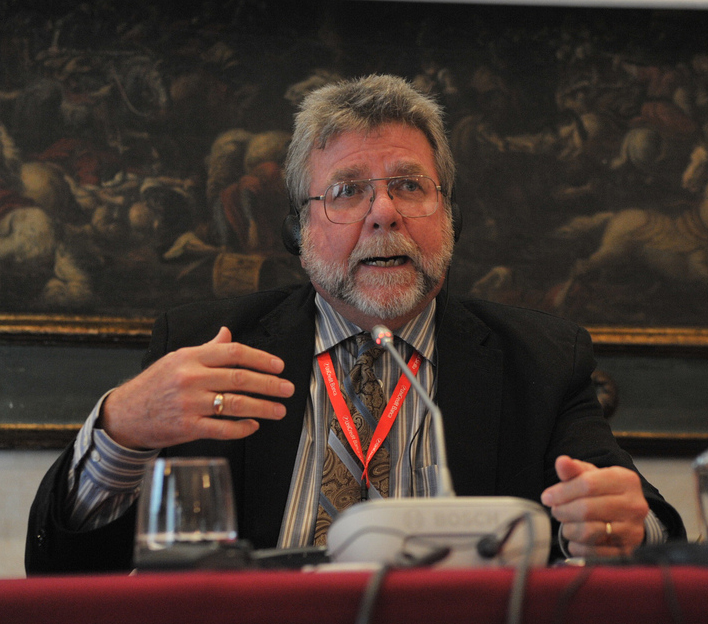
- Doig in 2010
- Born: Stephen Keith Doig
- Education: Defense Information School (public affairs personnel training); Dartmouth (political science)
- Occupations: Journalist; Since 1996: Knight Professor of Journalism; Walter Cronkite School of Journalism and Mass Communication; Arizona State University
- Awards: The Miami Herald's; 1993 Pulitzer Prize for Public Service
- Military career
- Branch: United States Army
- Service years: Vietnam War era, 1970–1973
- Units: Defense Information School instructor; combat correspondent, HQ USARV
- Awards: Bronze Star for Service

Stephen K. Doig is an American journalist, professor of journalism at Arizona State University, and a consultant to print and broadcast news media with regard to data analysis investigative work. Doig moved to the university in 1996 after 23 years as a newspaper journalist, 19 of them with The Miami Herald. As of 2010, he taught classes in precision journalism, reporting public affairs, news writing, multimedia journalism, introduction to newsroom statistics, and media research methods.

Doig was a pioneer in the use of computer-assisted data analysis by reporters. For example, he was Miami Herald research editor when Hurricane Andrew struck South Florida in 1992. Analysis of property damages and local government building records showed that newer structures were more likely to have been damaged by the storm, and the team argued that easing the zoning, inspection, and building codes had caused greater storm losses, largely in a 16-page article "What Went Wrong". The newspaper won the 1993 Pulitzer Prize for Public Service citing its coverage "that not only helped readers cope ... but also showed how lax zoning, inspection and building codes had contributed to the destruction."

Doig's analysis of voting patterns in Florida in led him to believe that had there been no errors in vote counting in Florida during the 2000 U.S. presidential election, Democratic Party candidate Al Gore would have won the state's electoral votes instead of Republican Party candidate, and, thereby, the ultimate winner of the U.S. presidency, George W. Bush.

== Early years ==
Served in the United States Army, where he taught at the Defense Information School. Also served a year a combat correspondent in Vietnam during the Vietnam War.

== Reception ==
In 1990 the Committee for Skeptical Inquiry (CSICOP) awarded Doig the Responsibility in Journalism award for his work as a Science Editor for the Miami Herald.

== See also ==
- Crowd counting
- First inauguration of Barack Obama § Crowds and general ticket holders
- Restoring Honor rally § Crowd size
