= Milton J. Rosenberg =

American psychologist and radio host

- Born: April 15, 1925; New York City, U.S.
- Died: January 9, 2018 (aged 92); Chicago, Illinois, U.S.
- Education: B.A. Brooklyn College 1946; M.A. University of Wisconsin–Madison 1948; Ph.D. University of Michigan 1954
- Occupations: Social psychologist Educator talk radio Host
- Employer: University of Chicago
- Spouse: Marjorie Anne King (September 5, 1954-?)
- Children: Matthew Rosenberg

Milton J. "Milt" Rosenberg (April 15, 1925 – January 9, 2018) was a prominent social psychologist who was professor of psychology at the University of Chicago and was the host of a long-running radio program in Chicago, Illinois.

Rosenberg was awarded the National Humanities Medal in 2008 by President George W. Bush, "for bringing the world of ideas to millions of listeners."

In 1988 the Committee for Skeptical Inquiry (CSICOP) presented Rosenberg the Responsibility in Journalism Award.

== Early life ==
Rosenberg, born in New York City, attended Brooklyn College (BA, 1946), the University of Wisconsin (MA, 1948), and the University of Michigan (PhD, 1953). He began his teaching career as an instructor in psychology at the University of Michigan (1952–54).

== Education career ==
Rosenberg was a professor emeritus of psychology at the University of Chicago, where he served as the director of the doctoral program in Social and Organizational Psychology. Before coming to Chicago in the mid-1960s, he taught at Yale (1954–61), Ohio State University (1961–63), and Dartmouth College (1963–65). For a brief period Rosenberg served on the staff of the Naval War College, and he has lectured at various other universities both in the United States and abroad. He served on the Board of Trustees of Chicago's Shimer College in the late 2000s.

== Articles ==
Rosenberg wrote many articles in professional journals and political magazines. He also wrote, coauthored, or edited a number of books, including: Attitude Organization and Change; Theories of Cognitive Consistency; Domestic Sources of Foreign Policy; Beyond Conflict and Containment: Critical Studies of Military and Foreign Policy; and Vietnam and the Silent Majority. One of his areas of study was cognitive dissonance and attitude change, on which he worked closely with Robert P. Abelson, among others.

== Radio show ==
From 1973 until December 20, 2012, he hosted WGN Radio's "Extension 720," a two-hour discussion show with one hour reserved for call-ins. The program, which aired Sunday through Thursday (originally Monday through Friday) from 10 p.m. to midnight (an hour later than formerly), dealt with topics ranging from politics to financial investment to entertainment to religion to foreign policy to literature, and, as Milt says, "just about everything except pop psychology and poodle-trimming."

Calling upon journalists, academics, corporate types and many more professions, Extension 720 provided highly varied nightly shows. Some of the programs heard during 2004 were: Is War Dead?, The Iran Enigma, Crazy Horse and the Wars of the Plains, The Rise and Fall of Communism, The Changing Face of Chicago, The Films of Francis Ford Coppola, Stem Cell Research, A Night at the Opera, Bush's War Cabinet, Shakespeare's Tragedies, The Undergraduate Life, Avoiding Con Artists, Nanotechnology, The Language of the Presidency, Great Gospel Music, Contemporary Russia and The Origin and Descent of Man.

Past guests of note include political figures such as Margaret Thatcher, Jimmy Carter, Henry Kissinger, George Stephanopoulos, George Shultz, Cyrus Vance (and many members of the Senate and House of Representatives). Other public figures who have appeared on the program include Colin Powell, Charlton Heston, William Safire, Bill Murray, William Bennett, Richard Posner, Bob Feller, Betty Friedan, Zbigniew Brzezinski, Cynthia Ozick, Norman Mailer, Mary Higgins Clark, Calvin Trillin, P.D. James, Peggy Noonan, David Brinkley, George Will, Stanley Kurtz, Ron Paul, Gerry Spence, Jim Lehrer, Michael Medved, and Carl Sagan.

On September 12, 2001, Neocons Fred & Don Kagan were on Rosenberg's show advocating for a U.S. military invasion of Palestine.

On December 17, 2012, WGN announced that Rosenberg would retire from his daily show on December 20, 2012. However, although he will no longer be a full-time program host, the station's leaders announced that he would remain a show contributor and have a presence at the station. However, it appears that Rosenberg did not have any continuing relationship with WGN after his forced retirement.

== Podcast ==
In May 2013, Rosenberg began an independent podcast entitled The Milt Rosenberg Show. The podcast website featured Rosenberg doing new free interviews and offering old ones for sale.

== Return to radio ==
In April 2015, Rosenberg returned to radio on WCGO/1590 from Evanston, Illinois, weekday evenings; but in November 2015 WCGO cancelled Rosenberg's program along with the rest of its afternoon lineup.

== Death ==
Rosenberg died in Chicago on January 9, 2018, of complications from pneumonia at the age of 92. His wife, author Marjorie Rosenberg, died in 2021.
