= Andrew A. Skolnick =

American journalist

- Education: B.A., M.S.
- Alma mater: Columbia University Graduate School of Journalism
- Occupations: Journalist, photographer, editor
- Writing career
- Genre: Journalism
- Subject: Science
- Notable awards: 1998 Rosalynn Carter Fellowship for Mental Health Journalism; 2000 AMWA John P. McGovern Award; 2005 Robert P Balles Prize in Critical Thinking
- Website: www.aaskolnick.com

Andrew A. Skolnick is an American science and medical journalist and photographer best known for his investigative reporting on health care issues, alternative medicine, and paranormal claims.

== Education and career ==
In 1972, Skolnick participated in a two-year professional photography certificate program at the Paier College of Art, then received a B.A. from Charter Oak State College in 1978 and an M.S. from the Columbia University Graduate School of Journalism in 1981.

At Yale University, Skolnick was a scientific photographer in the biology department from 1975 to 1977, and a visiting lecturer teaching scientific photography from 1976 to 1977. His journalism experience began as a science writer for the March of Dimes Birth Defects Foundation from 1981 to 1985, after which he served as the life sciences editor at the University of Illinois, Urbana-Champaign News Bureau from 1985 to 1987, the associate science news editor at the American Medical Association (AMA) from 1987 until 1989, and an associate news editor at the Journal of the American Medical Association (JAMA).

From 2004 to 2006, Skolnick served as the executive director of the Center for Inquiry's Commission on Scientific Medicine and Mental Health.

In 1996, he was invited to China for a semester to teach western journalism at Shanghai International Studies University, where he also served as language adviser and script editor for Shanghai Television International Broadcasting Service.

In 1998, the Carter Center Mental Health Program awarded Skolnick with an inaugural Rosalynn Carter Fellowship for Mental Health Journalism to investigate the treatment of jail and prison inmates with mental illness, an investigation which led to the publication of two news reports in JAMA and to a special series in the St. Louis Post-Dispatch titled "Death, Neglect and the Bottom Line".

Skolnick's reporting has received awards from health, media, and humanitarian organizations, including World Hunger Year, the National Association of Community Health Centers, the Carter Center Mental Health Program, and the Committee for Skeptical Inquiry. Skolnick, Bell and Allen also received Amnesty International USA's "Spotlight on Media Award" and, in 1999, were listed by Harvard University's Joan Shorenstein Center on the Press, Politics and Public Policy as finalists for the Goldsmith Prize for Investigative Reporting. The following year, the American Medical Writers Association awarded Skolnick the 2000 John P. McGovern Medal for Preeminence in Medical Communication.

For the Skeptical Inquirer series "Testing the Girl with the X-Ray Eyes" authors Ray Hyman, Joe Nickell, and Skolnick were co-recipients of CSI's 2005 Robert P. Balles Prize in Critical thinking. Skolnick's award was for the article "Natasha Demkina: The Girl with the Normal Eyes".

In 1992 the Committee for Skeptical Inquiry (CSICOP) presented Skolnick with the Responsibility in Journalism Award for his work as editor of Medical News & Perspectives for the Journal of the American Medical Association

Since his retirement from journalism in 2006 Skolnick has focused on photography of dogs, and provides photography and web site design for dog clubs and breeders.

== Controversies ==
=== TM lawsuit ===
In 1992, Skolnick, JAMA's editor George Lundberg, and the AMA were sued for $194 million by Deepak Chopra and two Transcendental Meditation (TM) organizations over Skolnick's article titled, "Maharishi Ayur-Veda: Guru's Marketing Scheme Promises the World Eternal 'Perfect Health.'" The suit alleged Skolnick's report on TM's health care products and services marketed under the trademarked name Maharishi Ayurveda was libelous and that it tortiously interfered with their business interests.

In an August 1992 decision, judge Charles Kocoras rejected the plaintiff's motion to enjoin JAMA and Skolnick from publishing statements about Chopra and Hari Sharma and Maharishi Ayurveda alleged to be defamatory, noting that the plaintiffs did not allege that the statements about them in the article were false or misleading. The decision held that "plaintiffs have little likelihood of prevailing on the merits of their disparagement claim", and that the allegedly defamatory statements were protected as "fair comment and criticism" on an issue of public concern. Shortly thereafter, the case was dismissed without prejudice in March 1993.

=== CMS lawsuit ===
The AMA dismissed Skolnick when Correctional Medical Services, one of the for-profit health care companies criticized in the "Death, Neglect and the Bottom Line" article, threatened JAMA and the Post-Dispatch with litigation.

Skolnick also sued CMS, claiming their responses to the articles were defamatory, but a summary judgement ruled in favor of CMS, the defendants.
