= Cardiooncology =

Interdisciplinary medical research field

Cardiooncology, cardio-oncology or cardiovascular oncology is an interdisciplinary field of medicine which study the molecular and clinical alterations in cardiovascular system during the different methods of treatment of cancer, especially chemotherapy and targeted therapy.

Since 2018 the European Society of Cardiology has had a council of cardio-oncology.
