= Skeptic's Toolbox =

Annual four-day workshop devoted to scientific skepticism

The Skeptic's Toolbox
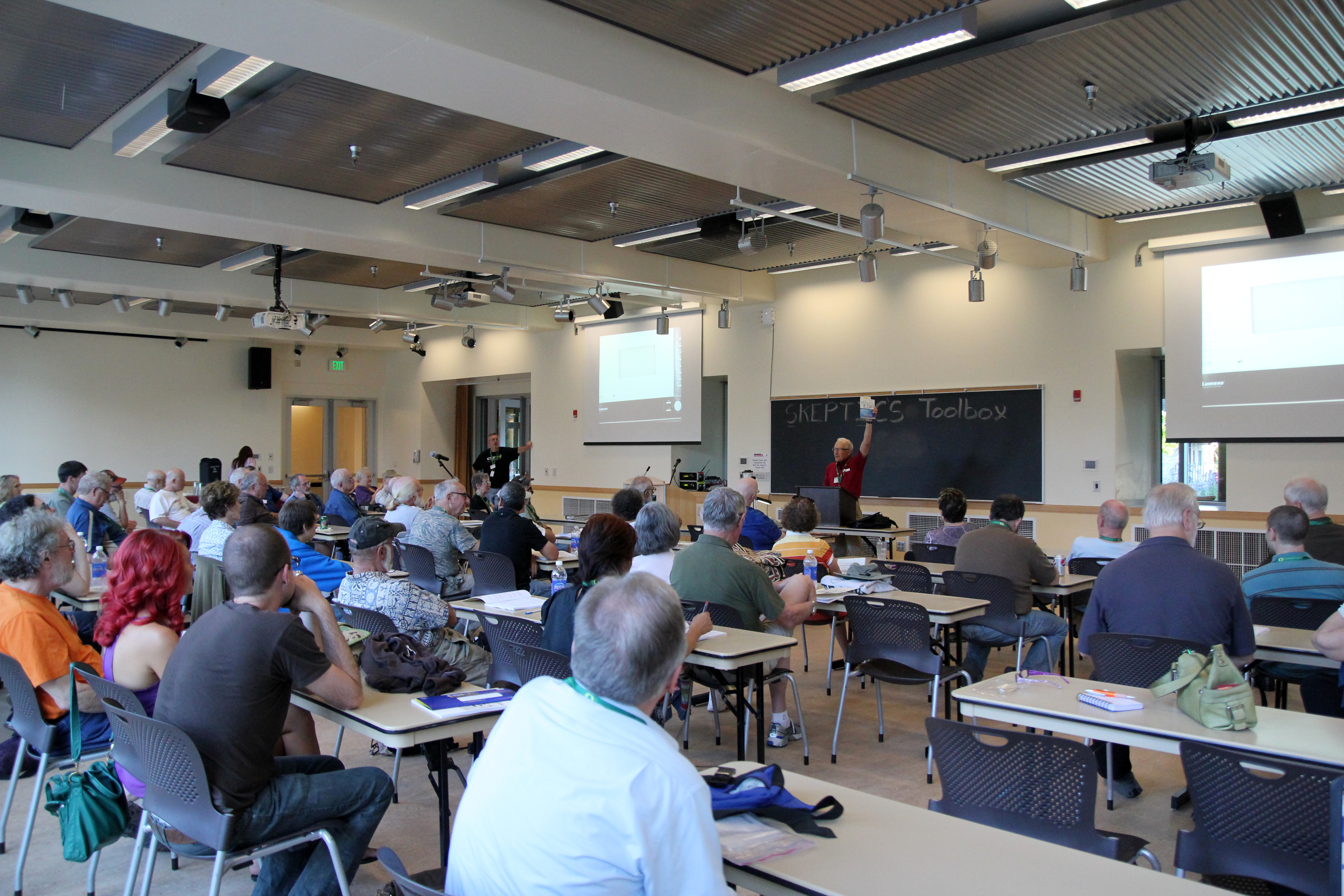
- Ray Hyman at The Skeptic's Toolbox 2012
- Status: Active
- Genre: science and skepticism
- Locations: University of Oregon, Eugene, OR
- Country: United States
- Inaugurated: 1989
- Organizer: Committee for Skeptical Inquiry
- Website: http://www.skepticstoolbox.org

The Skeptic's Toolbox was a four-day workshop devoted to scientific skepticism. Founded by psychologist and now-retired University of Oregon professor Ray Hyman, it was sponsored by the Committee for Skeptical Inquiry. Annual workshops focused on educating people to be better critical thinkers, and involved a central theme. The attendees formed small groups and were given tasks that to work on and whose results they then presented to the entire workshop on the final day.

== History ==
Hyman created the Skeptic's Toolbox in 1989 to teach people how to be better skeptics. He tells James Underdown that "we were putting out more fires by skeptics than by believers... they were going overboard". The first toolbox was in Buffalo, NY with himself, James Alcock and Steve Shaw (now called Banachek). With the exception of the first year in Buffalo and one year when the toolbox was held in Boulder, Colorado, the toolbox was held at the University of Oregon in Eugene. Attendance was generally limited to approximately 90 participants so that everyone would receive personalized attention and the opportunity to participate. At the 1993 Toolbox, "More than a hundred people participated, from 19 states, Canada, and Hong Kong, and their enthusiasm continued to grow with each passing day, ending on the fifth day with what appeared to be a unanimous 'If only we had more time!'".

In 1997 Skeptical Inquirer announced that CFI would begin offering an academic certificate for students in a three-year program. Students needed to complete 30 units in academic work as well as in workshops. The two certificates offered were Humanistic Studies and Science and the Paranormal, attending The Skeptic's Toolbox would satisfy one of the workshop requirements.

== Methodology and focus ==
While critical thinking was the overall focus, lectures designed around the theme focused on the specialties of the faculty. A reporter for the Register-Guard attended the 2003 toolbox, and wrote of his experience hearing lectures on post traumatic stress syndrome, graphology, repressed memory court cases, communication with the dead, healing through prayer, traditional Chinese medicine, psychic dogs, and Jerry Andrus's display of optical illusions. The goal of the Toolbox was to "help skeptics add to their arsenal of tools and techniques with which to both guard against deception and properly evaluate paranormal claims". Learning how to communicate with believers was also a main theme: "Skeptics search for truths, believers tend to want validation of their experiences".

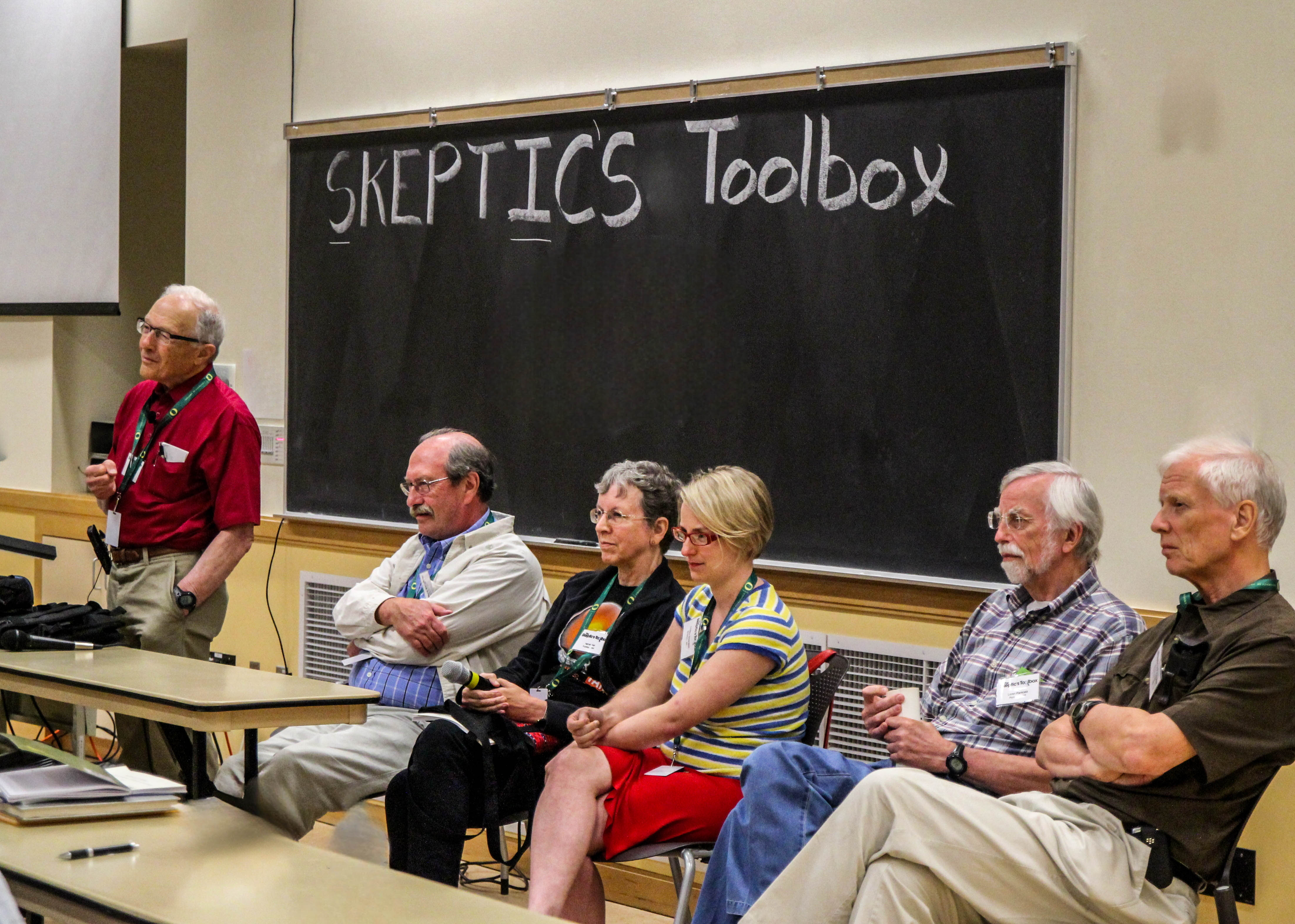
August 9–12, 2012 Evaluating Evidence: Garbage In, Garbage Out Faculty – Ray Hyman, Richard Wackrow, Harriet Hall, Lindsay Beyerstein, Loren Pankratz and James Alcock

Communicating the skeptical message to non-skeptics was the focus at the 1993 workshop. Faculty felt that non-skeptics might be more receptive if attendees understood how they were perceived by others. "Many people view skeptics as die-hard cynics and debunkers, even as enemies of free speech. Non-skeptics often hear only the "COP" in CSICOP".

In 2010, interviewed by D. J. Grothe, Hyman explained, "give people the tools to think, help them to become better thinkers". Mentalist Bob Fellows performed at the second conference and told the audience, "The effect (of a magic trick) on audiences who (believe the trick is real magic) can be enormously powerful. And when deceit is involved, they can be potentially harmful as well". Hyman felt that it was necessary to teach attendees with a "case-based approach... concrete examples as a first step toward extracting broad examples... (giving) the benefit of context" to the learning experience.

== Faculty ==
Loren Pankratz – A founding faculty member of the Skeptic's Toolbox, Pankratz explained to Harriet Hall, about the beginnings of the Toolbox, "Ray Hyman, Jerry Andrus and I were meeting together once a month or so and we decided that maybe the three of us could put a Toolbox together."

Barry Beyerstein – "One of the many enjoyable tasks I undertake for CSICOP is to lecture in Ray Hyman's annual summer workshop at the University of Oregon. Not only is it the towering presence of Ray himself, and the joy of observing the sheer brainpower of my fellow faculty at work, it is also the people, literally from around the world, who enroll in this and other CSICOP functions that keep me from suffering that occupational hazard 'skeptic's burnout.' They are a remarkable lot, genuinely nice people committed to critical thinking and leaving the place a bit better than they found it. They make me very pleased that my fate was to become a skeptical inquirer."

Harriet Hall – Prior to attending the Toolbox as a student, Hall had been a "passive skeptic", "I hadn't done any writing... Ray Hyman and Wally Sampson encouraged me to try my hand at writing, one thing led to another and now I'm on the faculty of the Skeptic's Toolbox."

Lindsay Beyerstein – She started attending the Skeptic's Toolbox when she was 14; her father Barry Beyerstein strongly influenced her involvement in the skeptical movement. "It's sorta funny, the skeptics' movement is now finally old enough, it's like Scientology, we have second gen!" She recounts, "I was always involved with my Dad in skeptical meetings... "We would have family newsletter-stuffing nights (for the BC Skeptics)." instead of hiring babysitters her father would take Lindsay to his media interviews. "Does Satanic music cause suicide? Out-of-body experiences... it was always something new and different."

James Alcock – "Ray and I and a magician by the name of Steve Shaw, now known as Banachek did the very first Toolbox in Buffalo... a little while later Ray asked me if I could come out here to this group." Ray stated "It took a long while to get Jim out here, but finally we managed it."

Dates	Theme	Faculty	Notes
October 20–22, 1989	Skeptical Inquiry: The Role of the Skeptic	Ray Hyman, James Alcock, Banachek	Held at the University of New York, Buffalo
August 20–24, 1992	The Skeptic's Toolbox; The Complete Skeptic's Field Guide – the goal was to create a pocket-sized manual for skeptics	Ray Hyman, Barry Beyerstein, Loren Pankratz, Jeff Mayhew, Jerry Andrus	First one held in Eugene, Oregon
August 19–23, 1993	The Skeptic's Toolbox II; Case-Based Reasoning – Using model cases to generate principles for use in a similar situation	Ray Hyman, Jerry Andrus, Barry Beyerstein, Bob Fellows, Loren Pankratz	
August 4–8, 1994	The Skeptic's Toolbox III: Thinking; Good, Bad & Critical	Ray Hyman, Barry Beyerstein, Loren Pankratz, Jerry Andrus	Held at the University of Colorado, Boulder
August 17–21, 1995	Human Error; Psychology of belief and error	Ray Hyman, James Alcock, Jerry Andrus, Barry Beyerstein, Loren Pankratz	
No Workshop	Conflict with celebration ceremonies of CSICOP's 20th Anniversary		
August 21–25, 1997	The Skeptic's Toolbox '97; Seven critical questions to apply to any skeptical inquiry	Ray Hyman, James Alcock, Jerry Andrus, Barry Beyerstein, Loren Pankratz	
August 20–24, 1998	Psychology of Deception: Scams, Cons and other Deceits; Deception, Self-deception, Advertising, Illusions, Psychopaths	Ray Hyman, Wallace Sampson, Jerry Andrus, Barry Beyerstein, Loren Pankratz	
August 19–23, 1999	The Skeptic's Toolbox '99: Science vs Pseudoscience; Model cases: Oregon Vortex, Near death experiences, Fooling scientists	Ray Hyman, James Alcock, Jerry Andrus, Barry Beyerstein, Loren Pankratz, Wallace Sampson	
August 17–20, 2000	The Inquisitive Skeptic Workshop; Examples of claims for the participants to examine	Ray Hyman, James Alcock, Jerry Andrus, Barry Beyerstein, Loren Pankratz, Wallace Sampson, Massimo Polidoro	
August 16–19, 2001	Talking to the Dead and other Transcendental Seductions; Mediumship, Dissociation, etc.	Ray Hyman, James Alcock, Jerry Andrus, Barry Beyerstein, Loren Pankratz, Wallace Sampson, Massimo Polidoro	
August 15–18, 2002	How to Be a "Whys" Skeptic; Getting our message across	Jerry Andrus, Barry Beyerstein, Loren Pankratz, Wallace Sampson, Ray Hyman, James Alcock	
August 14–17, 2003	Critiquing Research: Determining Adequacy; Evidence, Statistics, Persistence	Ray Hyman, James Alcock, Jerry Andrus, Barry Beyerstein, Loren Pankratz, Wallace Sampson	
August 12–15, 2004	The YOU You Don't Know; Unconscious, Ideomotor, Hypnosis	Ray Hyman, James Alcock, Jerry Andrus, Loren Pankratz, Wallace Sampson, Barry Beyerstein	In The Trenches Award winners – Carol & Ben Baumgartner and Wilma Russell
August 11–14, 2005	The Classics of Skeptical Investigation; Pitted windshields, Clever Hans, Memory in Water, etc.	Ray Hyman, James Alcock, Jerry Andrus, Loren Pankratz, Barry Beyerstein, Wallace Sampson	In The Trenches Award winners – Herb Masters and Jeanine DeNoma
August 10–13, 2006	The Healthy Skeptic; Quackery, Bogus therapies, Self-help, Personal testimony, alternative medicine	Ray Hyman, James Alcock, Jerry Andrus, Loren Pankratz, Barry Beyerstein, Wallace Sampson	In The Trenches Award winners – Chris Clarke and Harriet Hall
August 9–12, 2007	Changing Minds; Persuasion, Conversion, Brain-washing, Ethics of behavior control	Ray Hyman, James Alcock, Jerry Andrus, Loren Pankratz, Lindsay Beyerstein, Wallace Sampson,	In The Trenches Award winner – Judy Kjellerman
August 7–10, 2008	Your Wonderful Brain; Free-will, Cognitive illusions, Brain fitness programs, Eyewitness testimony, Blindspots	Ray Hyman, Lindsay Byerstein, Loren Pankratz, Wallace Sampson, James Alcock	In The Trenches Award winners – Susan Beyerstein and Charles Wynn
August 6–9, 2009	The Scientific Method	Ray Hyman, Harriet A. Hall “Tooth Fairy Science and Other Pitfalls: Applying Rigorous Science to Messy Medicine.”, Lindsay Byerstein, Loren Pankratz, James Alcock	In The Trenches Award winner – Steve Campbell
August 12–15, 2010	SCAMS!	Ray Hyman, James Alcock, Loren Pankratz, Anthony Pratkanis, Lindsay Beyerstein, Harriet Hall	In The Trenches Award winner – Michael Bennett
August 11–14, 2011	How Smart People Go Wrong	Ray Hyman, Loren Pankratz, Lindsay Beyerstein, Harriet Hall, James Alcock	In The Trenches Award winner – Heidi Shaw
August 9–12, 2012	Evaluating Evidence: Garbage In, Garbage Out	Ray Hyman, Lindsay Beyerstein, Harriet Hall, James Alcock, Loren Pankratz, Richard Wackrow	In The Trenches Award winner – Susan Gerbic; Barry Karr awarded 25 years of service. Also, Toolbox faculty recognized as honorary Trenches winners
August 8–11, 2013	Using Probabilistically Challenged Minds to Cope with Uncertainty	Ray Hyman, Lindsay Beyerstein, Harriet Hall, James Alcock, Loren Pankratz	In The Trenches Award winner – Richard E. Wackrow
August 7–10, 2014	Using Model Cases to Deal with Dubious Claims	Ray Hyman, Lindsay Beyerstein, Harriet Hall, James Alcock, Loren Pankratz	In the Trenches Award winner – Jerry Schwarz
August 6–9, 2015	FRAMING: Sanctifying the Bogus and Demonizing the Scientific	Ray Hyman, Lindsay Beyerstein, Harriet Hall, James Alcock, Loren Pankratz	Trish Randall

== Other ==
Gallery of photos

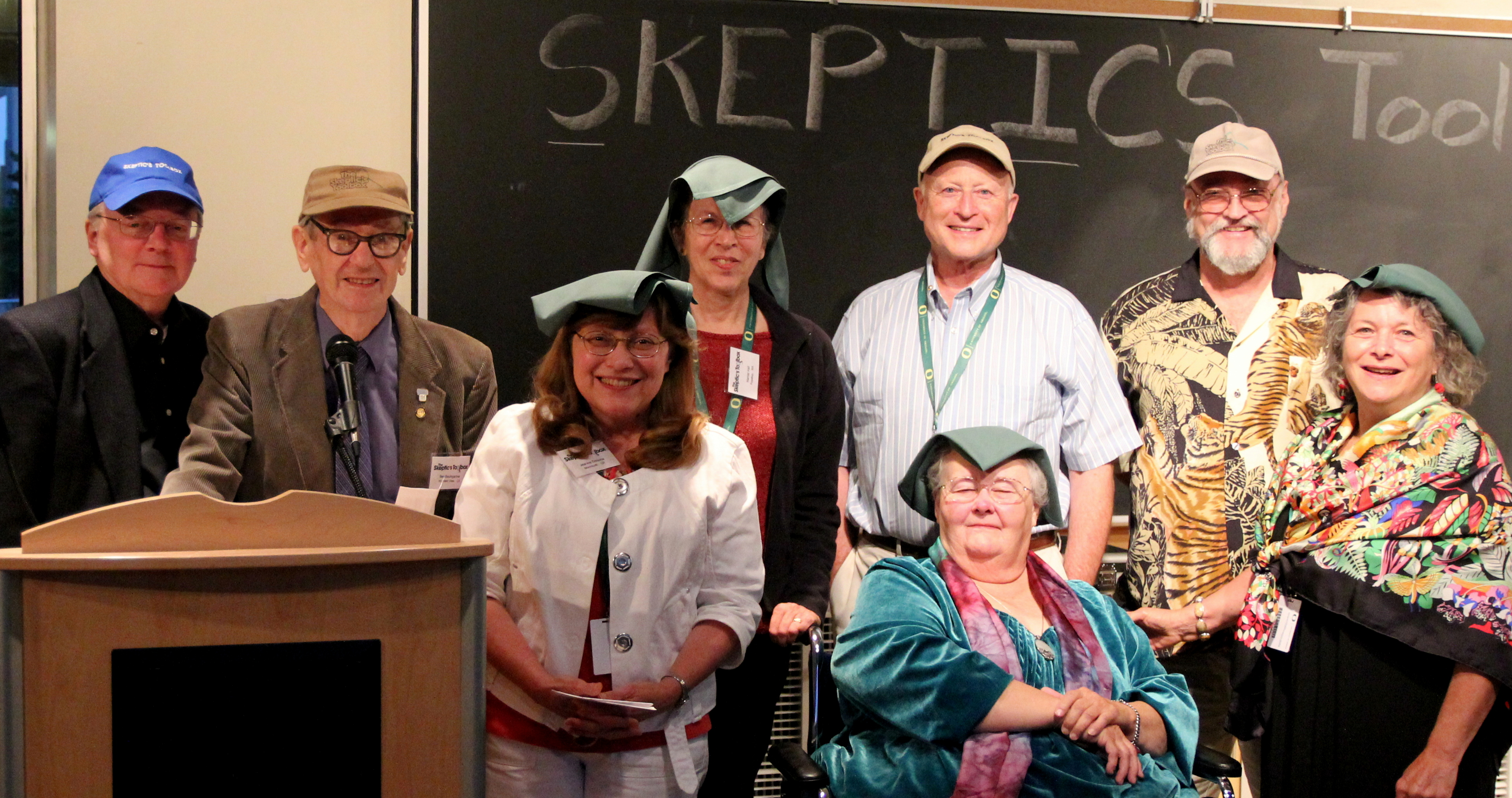
In the Trenches past winners. (left – back) Steve Campbell, Ben Baumgartner, Harriet Hall, Charles Wynn, Herb Masters. (left – front) Jeanine DeNorma, Carol Baumgartner and Suzi Beyerstein. All who forgot their Skeptic's Toolbox hat, wore a cloth napkin on their head.

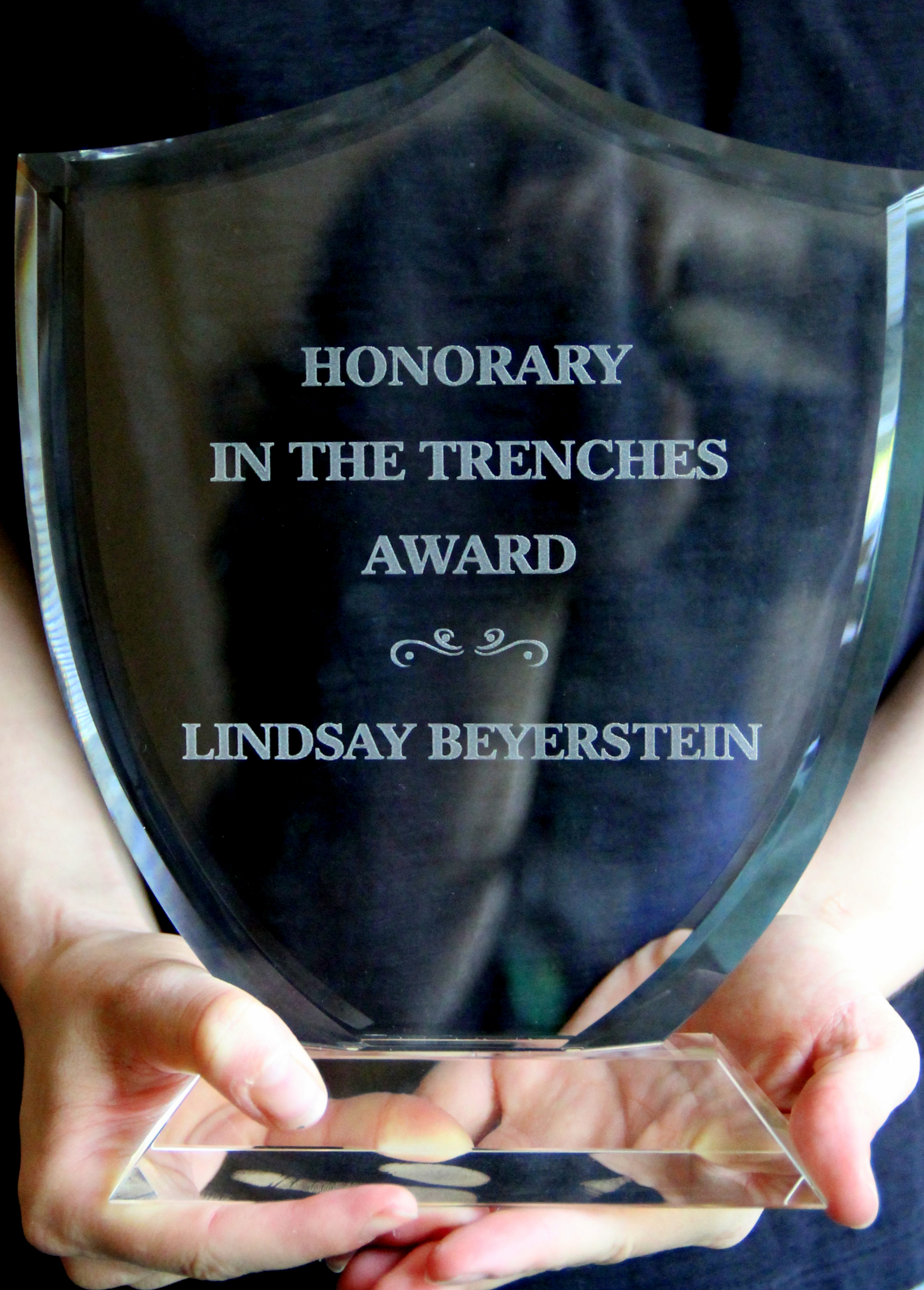
Each of the faculty of 2012's Skeptic's Toolbox are presented by long-time attendees Carol and Ben Baumgartner, with an Honorary In The Trenches Award

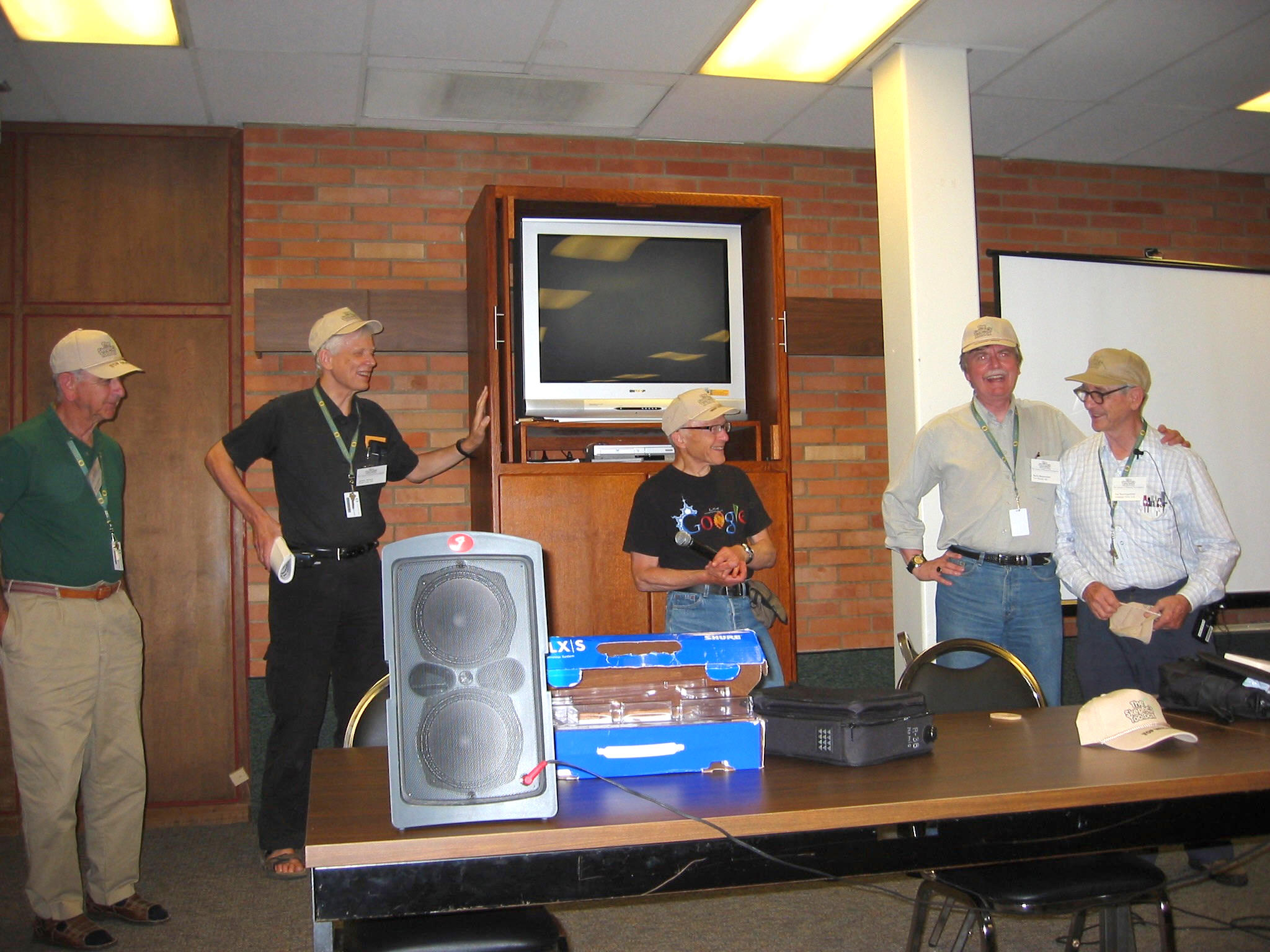
Skeptical Toolbox regular Ben Baumgartner (far right) presents the faculty with Skeptic's Toolbox hats. From left Wallace Sampson, James Alcock, Ray Hyman and Barry Beyerstein. August 2005

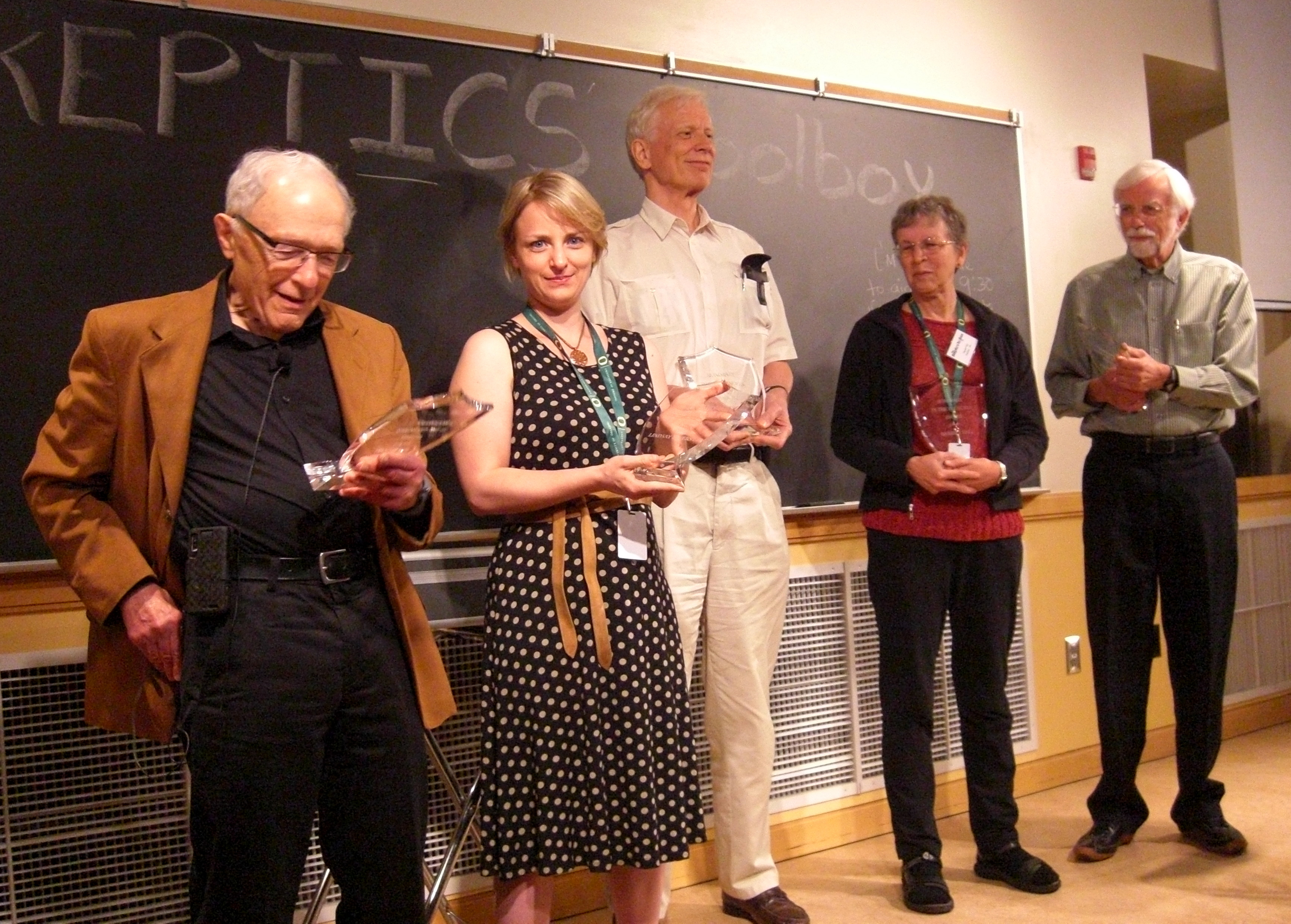
Each of the faculty of 2012's Skeptic's Toolbox are presented by long-time attendees Carol and Ben Baumgartner, with an Honorary In The Trenches Award. Ray Hyman, Lindsay Beyerstein, James Alcock, Harriet Hall and Loren Pankratz

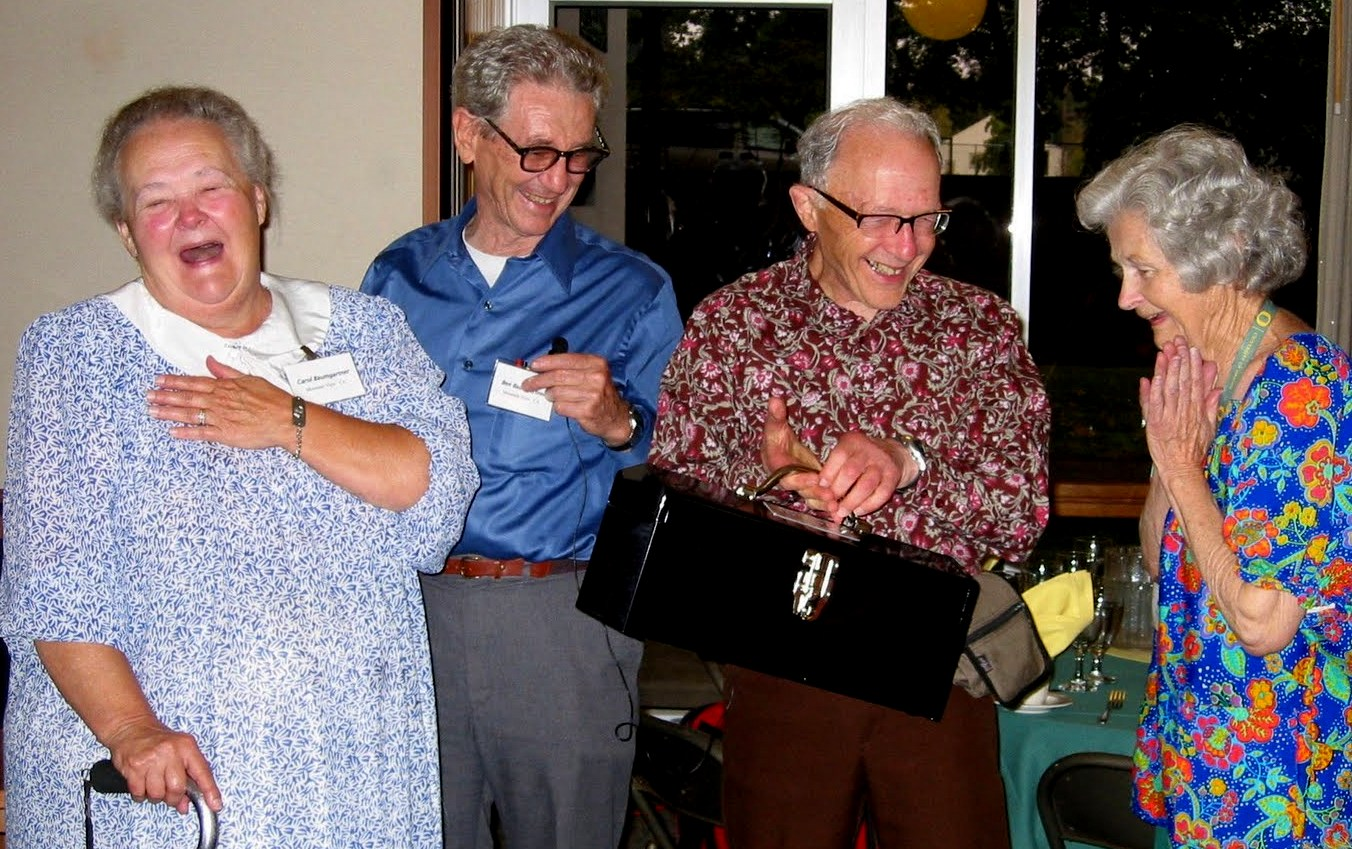
The first in the trenches award for the skeptic's toolbox. Eugene, Oregon 2004. With Ray Hyman, Carol and Ben Baumgartner and Wilma Russell

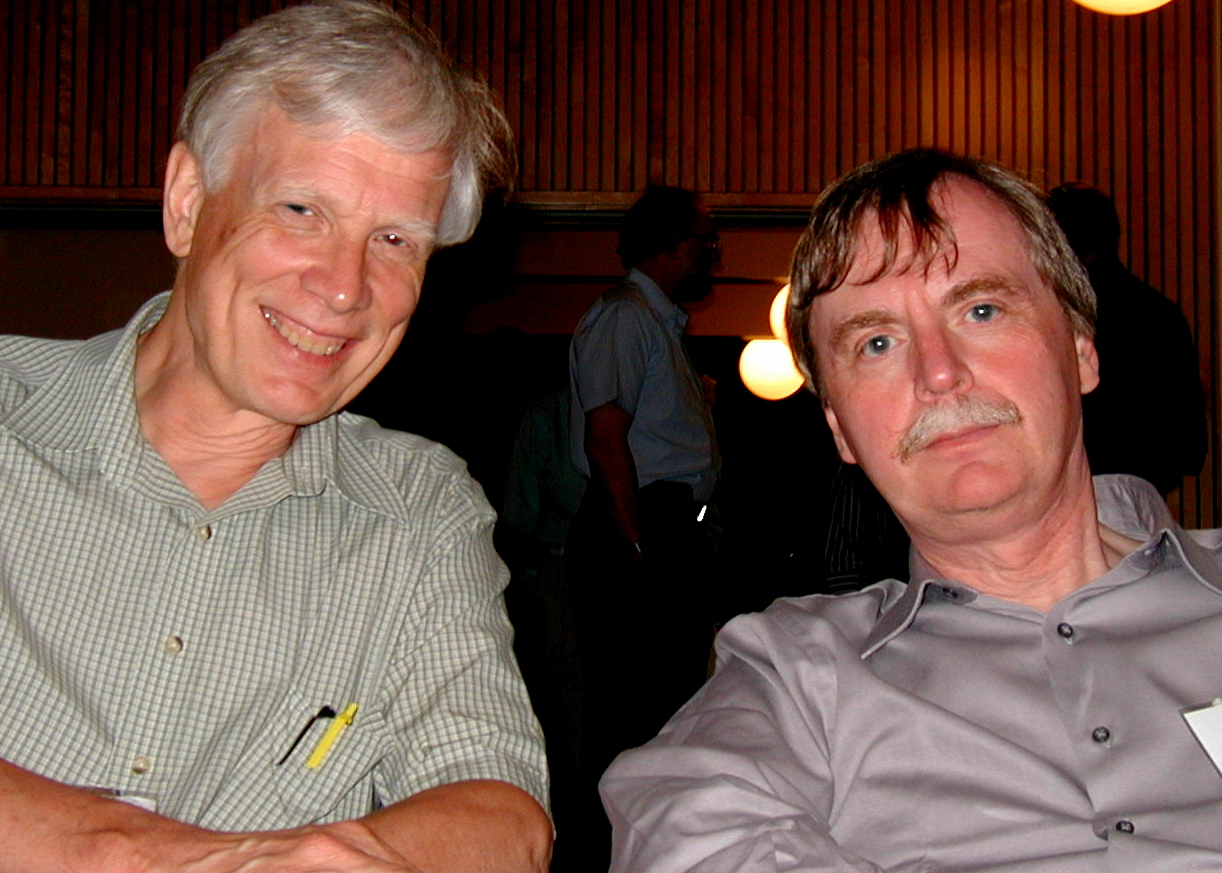
James Alcock and Barry Beyerstein at the Skeptic's Toolbox

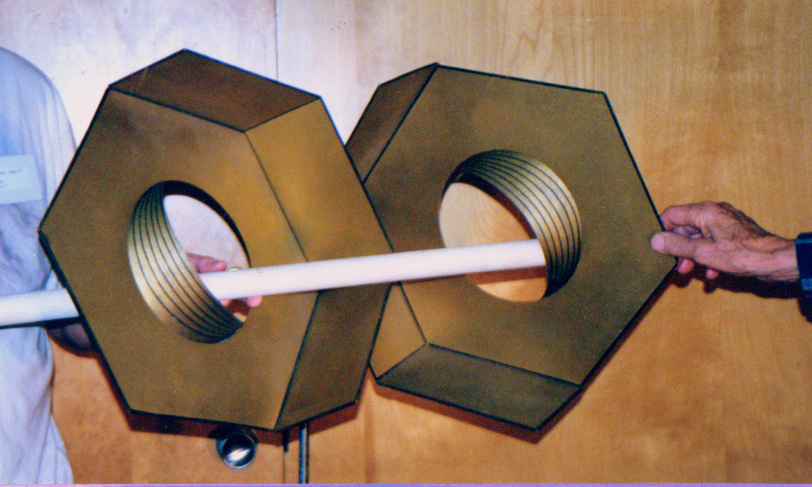
Nut & Bolt Illusion, invented by Jerry Andrus – Toolbox 2001

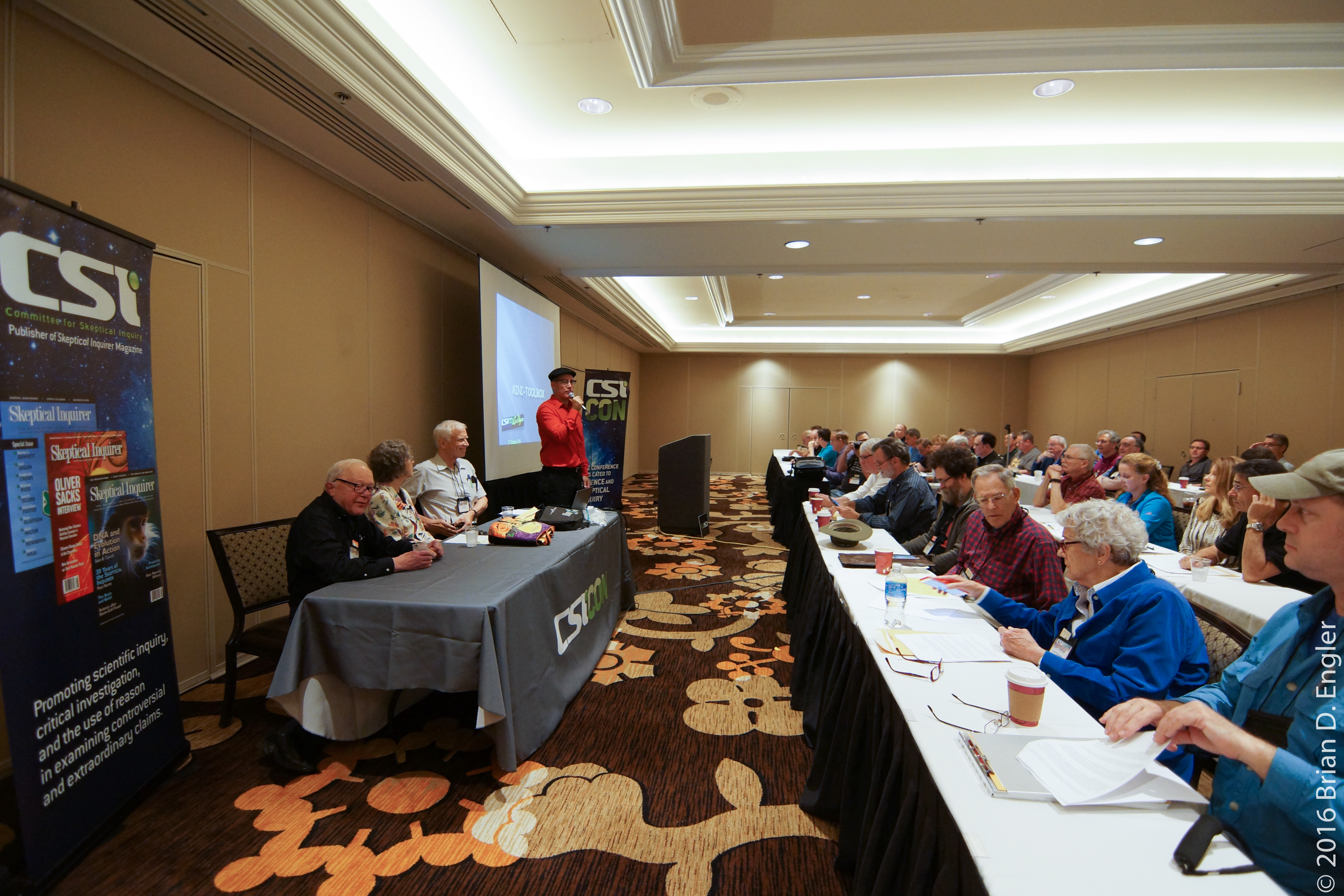
Mini-Skeptic's Toolbox at CSICon Las Vegas in 2016
