= Barry Beyerstein =

Canadian psychologist and scientific skeptic (1947–2007)

Barry Lane Beyerstein
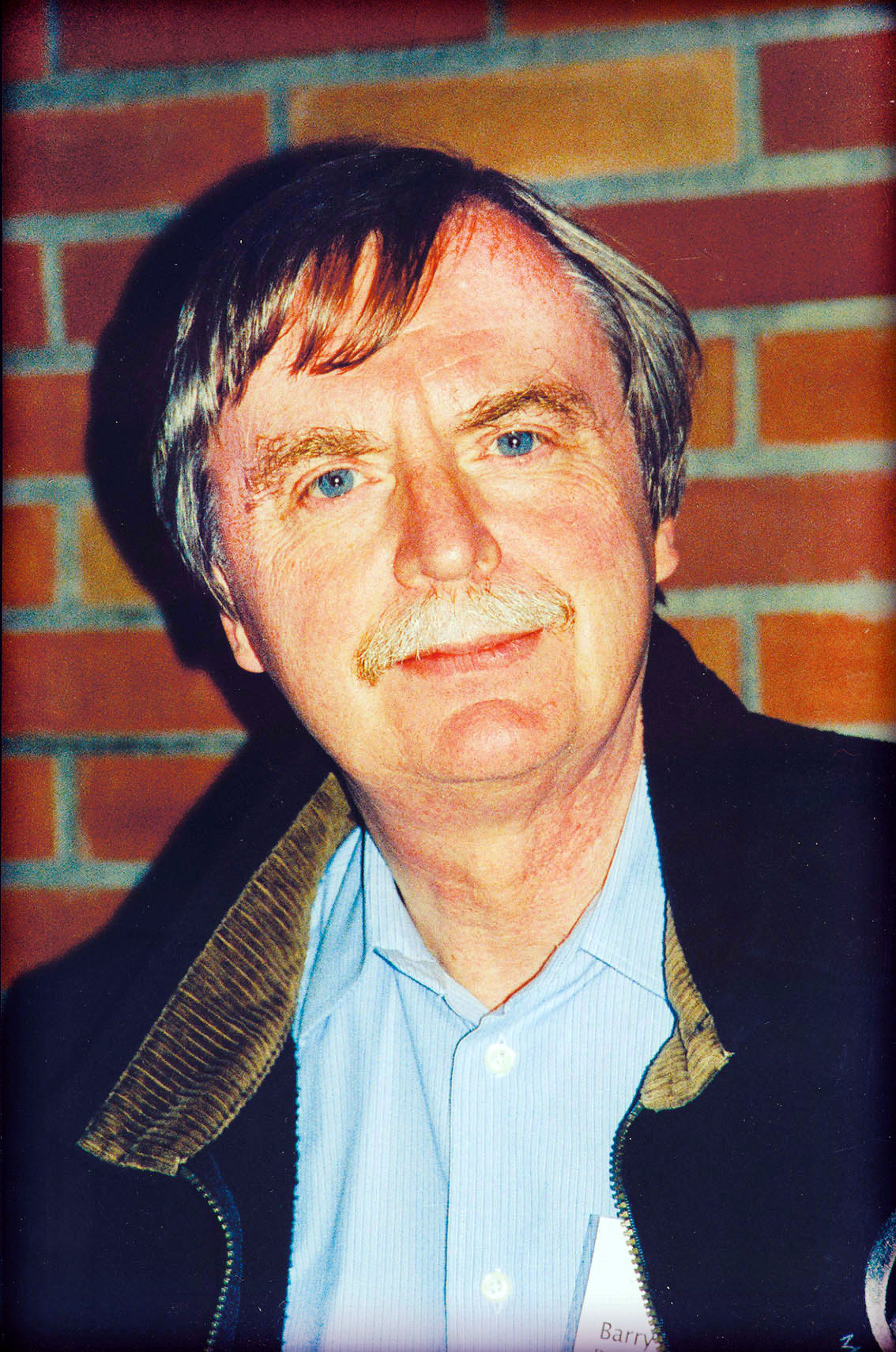
- Born: May 19, 1947; Edmonton, Alberta
- Died: June 25, 2007 (aged 60); Burnaby, British Columbia
- Education: Ph.D., University of California, Berkeley (1973)
- Occupation: University professor
- Children: 2
- Parent: Hilliard Beyerstein

Barry L Beyerstein (May 19, 1947 – June 25, 2007) was a scientific skeptic and professor of psychology at Simon Fraser University in Burnaby, British Columbia. Beyerstein's research explored brain mechanisms of perception and consciousness, the effects of drugs on the brain and mind, sense of smell and its lesser-known contributions to human cognition and emotion. He was founder and chair of the BC Skeptics Society, a Fellow and member of the Executive Council of the Committee for the Scientific Investigation of Claims of the Paranormal (CSICOP), now known as the Committee for Skeptical Inquiry. Associate editor of the Scientific Review of Alternative Medicine Journal as well as a contributor to Skeptical Inquirer, Beyerstein was one of the original faculty of CSICOP's Skeptic's Toolbox. Beyerstein was a co-founder of the Canadians for Rational Health Policy and a member of the advisory board of the Drug Policy Foundation of Washington D.C. He was a founding board member of the Canadian Foundation for Drug Policy and contributed to the International Journal of Drug Policy. According to long-time friend James Alcock, Beyerstein once addressed the House of Commons Standing Committee on Health during discussions leading up to the passage of the Controlled Substances Act". Along with his brother Dale, Barry was active in the British Columbia Civil Liberties Association.

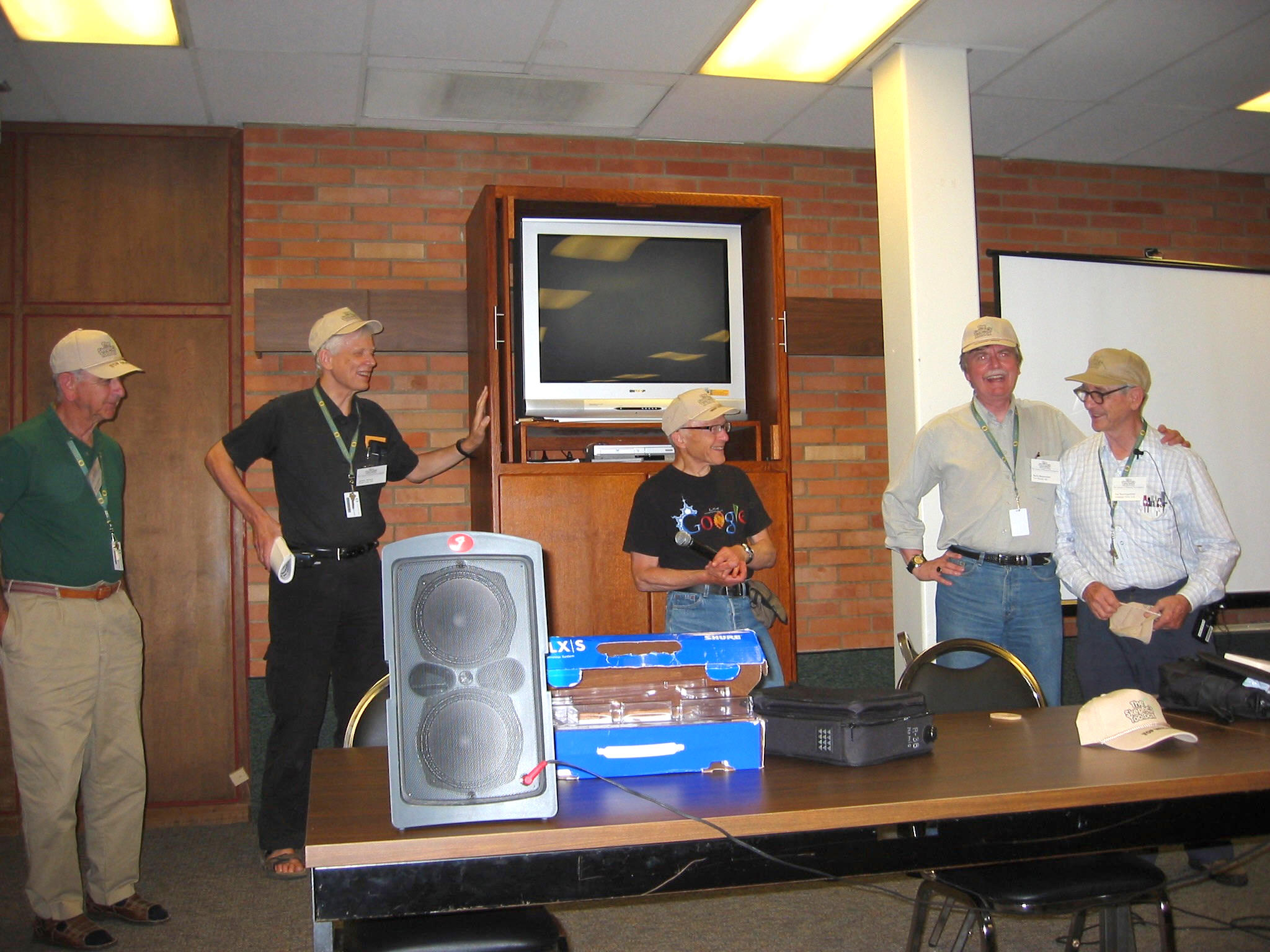
Skeptic's Toolbox regular Ben Baumgartner (far right) presents the faculty with Toolbox hats. From left Wallace Sampson, James Alcock, Ray Hyman and Barry Beyerstein. August 2005

== Early life ==
According to friend James Alcock, Barry's father Hilliard Beyerstein had many occupations during Barry's life: magician, chiropractor, bank manager, writer of self-help books, owner of a cosmetics manufacturing business, real estate speculator and building contractor. Barry's mother was a school teacher. When his father would build a house, the family would live in it for a while, then move. "Barry... moved thirty times within his neighborhood while growing up". Raised on magazines Fate and Popular Science as well as many paranormal TV shows, Beyerstein felt that this "enchantment... inclined me toward an eventual career in the study of consciousness". Intrigued throughout high school with séances, handwriting analysis, hypnosis and other paranormal beliefs, Beyerstein with the help of his friends, conducted many experiments. This was far before he learned about experimental controls, which explained the constant success of their tests.

Entering Simon Fraser University in 1965, Beyerstein declared his major in psychology with a minor in philosophy. "As I delved deeper into those subjects, I began to doubt the inevitability of an eventual happy marriage between science and the paranormal... after my first course in the philosophy of science... the fundamental assumptions and modus operandi of science were seriously at odds with most of what I knew of physical research." In 1968, Beyerstein moved to the San Francisco area to attend UC Berkeley, where "party chit-chat could accept a guest's description of his latest out-of-body experience or the need to have her chakras realigned as casually as one might receive the morning's weather forecast. I frequently found myself the odd man out... (they thought) I was a nice guy, but hopelessly 'linear' and 'left-brained', despite my de rigueur shoulder-length hair, tie-dye T-shirt, bell bottoms and cowboy boots."

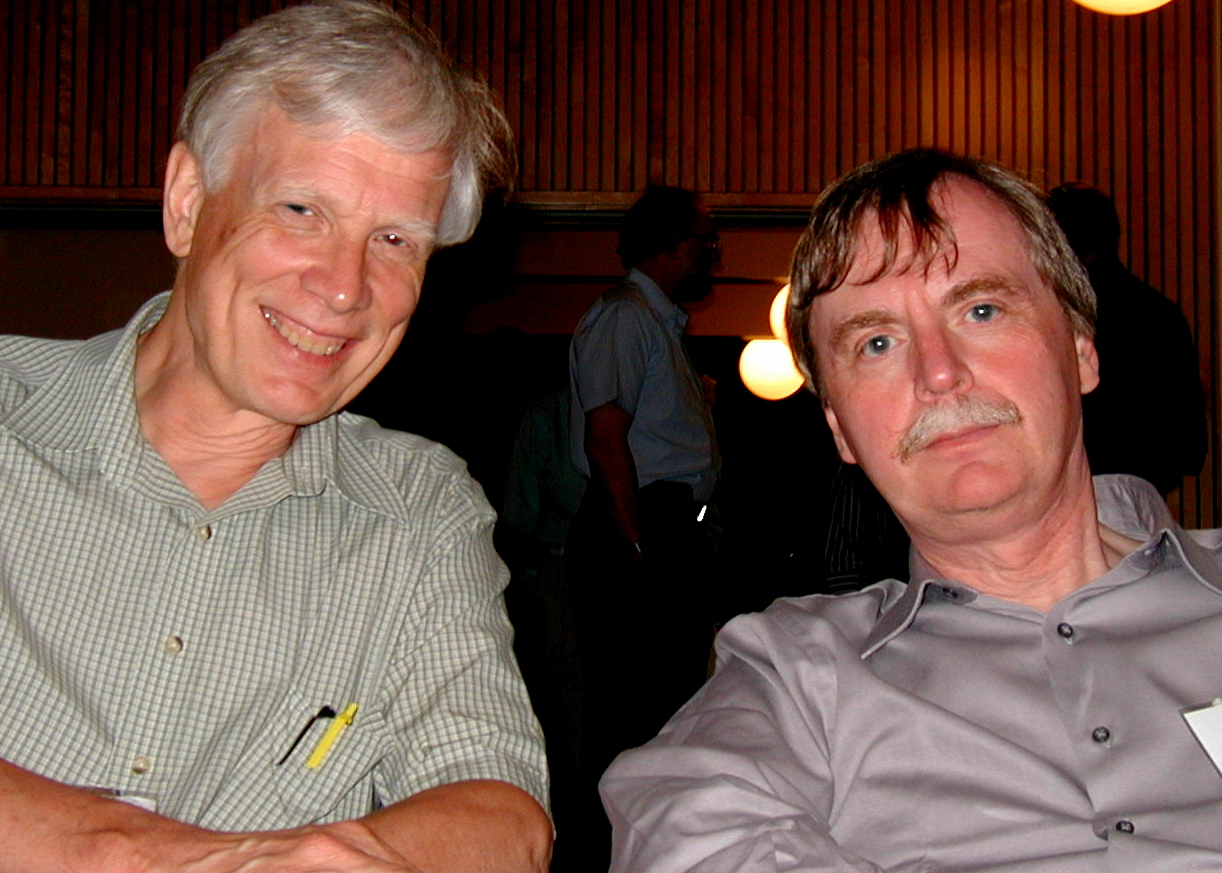
James Alcock and Beyerstein at the Skeptic's Toolbox

== Career ==
Beyerstein received his B.A. from Simon Fraser University in 1968, and a Ph.D. in Experimental and Biological Psychology from the UC Berkeley in 1973. In the 1970s Beyerstein collaborated with his colleague Bruce K. Alexander on the famous Rat Park study of addiction.

He has been publicly critical of unsupported claims of techniques to improve brain function. In the book Mind Myths Beyerstein sets out seven kinds of evidence refuting the ten percent myth including the fact that if even a tiny part of the brain is injured, there will be an effect on the subject. If the 10% statement were accurate then the brain could take more damage without affecting the quality of life.

At the Skeptic's Toolbox in 1993, Beyerstein laid out the unified theory by psychologists concerning brain function and the paranormal. "This theory holds that all mental phenomena are products of the physical brain and that when the brain is destroyed or severely damaged, consciousness ceases forever." The physical-brain viewpoint, "is supported by evolution, by the development of the individual human being, by pharmacological experiments, and by research on the effects of accidents affecting the brain."

While working as a professor at Simon Fraser, Beyerstein was asked to oversee an approval of a pro-parapsychology class. He assembled the writings of "some of the leading figures in the nascent skeptics alliance that Paul Kurtz was in the process of forging." This is when Beyerstein became aware of CSICOP "and got hooked on it". After writing for Skeptical Inquirer magazine (1985–88) Beyerstein was elected to the Executive Council.

Concerning Beyerstein's views of the skeptical community, "I have enjoyed my association with CSICOP so thoroughly as the opportunity it has afforded me to meet so many world scholars. I think the work that they do in the skeptical arena is often underappreciated in academic circles because many specialists fail to grasp the potential consequences of the strong antirational and antisciencific trends in modern society. They see no pressing need to oppose something publicly that they see as transparently ridiculous".

He also made an appearance in the first season of the television show Penn and Teller: Bullshit! to discuss the scientific basis of near-death experiences. "Near death experiences are generated by brain function and they don't prove there is an afterlife... these are complex hallucinations that are taking place in the theater of one's own mind."

In an article for Skeptical Inquirer magazine, titled "Why Bogus Therapies Seem to Work", Beyerstein outlined ten errors and biases that can lead people to incorrectly perceive medical benefits from ineffective treatments.

During an interview on Point of Inquiry the official podcast from Center For Inquiry Beyerstein listed the corporate and legislative misdeeds of the pharmaceutical industry and their larger negative impacts on humanity. Here Beyerstein lays out his views on drug advertising, political lobbying, patent creep, alternative medicine, and research being funded by pharmaceutical companies at many universities worldwide which have the cumulative effect of causing suffering for the poor and elderly while underserving the common and treatable ailments of the citizens of third world countries. Beyerstein decried the adverse effects that corporate profit from "lifestyle drugs" have had on medicine and public well-being. Addressing the example of restless leg syndrome, he said pharmaceutical companies are "making a disease out of the viccitudes of life."

At a meeting of the executive council of the Committee for Skeptical Inquiry (CSI) in Denver, Colorado, in April 2011, Beyerstein was selected for inclusion in CSI's Pantheon of Skeptics. The Pantheon of Skeptics was created by CSI to remember the legacy of deceased fellows of CSI and their contributions to the cause of scientific skepticism. CSI was previously known as the Committee for the Scientific Investigation of Claims of the Paranormal (CSICOP).

== Graphology ==
A reporter on the trail of the story of a graphologist hired by the Vancouver School Board to review the handwriting of teachers to identify which were child molesters asked Beyerstein if there was any evidence to support the validity of handwriting analysis. Beyerstein responded with the help of his brother Dale by editing the book "The Write Stuff" that interviews graphologists along with their critics. He was a vocal critic of graphology, which he identifies as pseudoscience similar to phrenology. According to friend and BC Skeptic co-founder Lee Muller, "... he and his brother all but eliminated graphology from the B.C. landscape".

Lecturing at the Skeptic's Toolbox, Beyerstein stated that graphology is more popular in Europe than in America; job applicants are discouraged to turn in a non-handwritten application. After extensive investigation, graphology "seems to rest on the notion of pareidolia'". As a discipline, graphology "lacks standardization in training; lack of commitment to research; absence of links with other disciplines; a tendency to self-publish rather than submit results to refereed journals and a distinct dearth of progress in the field".

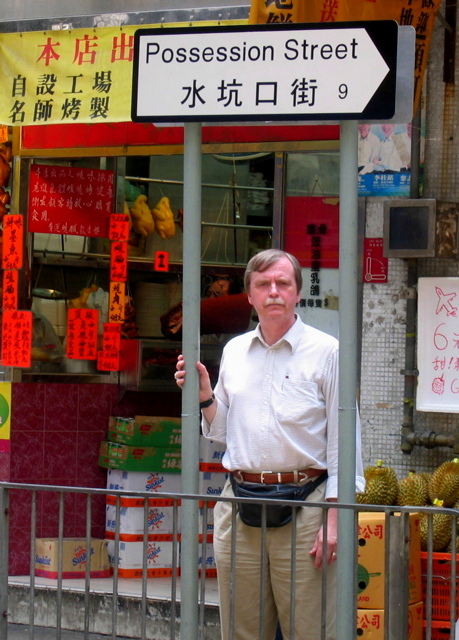
In China with CFI

== Criticism of Scientology ==
Beyerstein was a critic of Scientology, writing for the International Journal of Mental Health: "The areas of science that enjoy the greatest prestige at any moment are the most tempting targets for appropriation by pseudoscientists. Capitalizing on dramatic progress in the neurosciences, the merchants of personal success were quick to commandeer neurological jargon to provide a patina of authority. Scientology's 'engrams' and its notorious 'e-meter' were pioneers in this trend."

[O]n balance, psychotherapies founded on ill-conceived assumptions may still prove beneficial if they furnish needed reassurance in an atmosphere where clients can mull over solutions to their dissatisfactions about life. That said, the dangers posed by fringe therapists arise principally in three ways. One is the potential for manipulation and fraud. Cult-like pseudo-therapies can prey on the dependency needs of vulnerable people while extracting unconscionable amounts of money. The nonsensical prattle of Scientology is but one example. ... All told, these victims could have been helped much more ethically, effectively and cheaply by scientifically trained counselors who would target specific, tractable problems in their lives.

== Influenced ==
Daniel Loxton credits Beyerstein for his interest in skepticism. In several interviews, Loxton talked about attending a science fiction conference in British Columbia in 1991 and hearing Beyerstein speak on behalf of the BC Skeptics Society. "He calmly and kindly fielded questions from the audience – and I was shocked by almost everything he said. This wasn't the usual fluff: this guy really knew what he was talking about, in a way that I had never encountered before. Even his "I don't know"s were substantial in a way that I wasn't used to hearing." William B. Davis, of X-Files fame, also credits Beyerstein for introducing him to the skeptical community. After hearing an interview with Beyerstein, Davis, also a Canadian, became curious about the group and now lectures at skeptics' conferences himself.

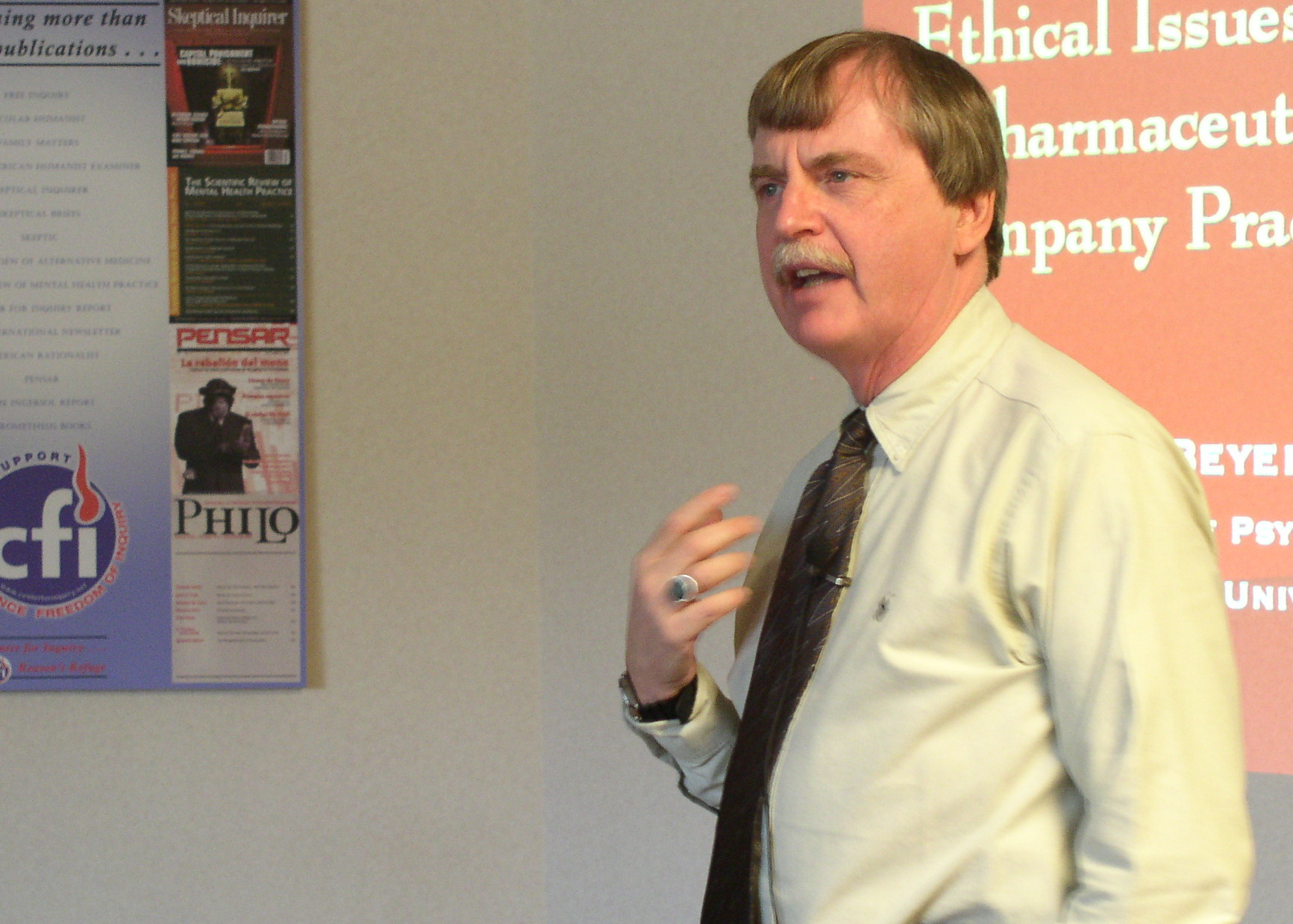
At CFI lecture

== Personal life ==
The scientific community, Beyerstein felt, had an obligation to reach out and explain. "If we want the public to pay taxes to support research, we owe them understandable explanations of what we do and the significance it has for them." He called the skeptical movement a "watchdog" and used the phrase, "a sort of Consumer Reports of the mind" when explaining CSICOP to the unknowing.

In an interview with James Underdown, Beyerstein's daughter Lindsay talks about her life growing up in the skeptical movement. ""I was always involved with my Dad in skeptical meetings ..."It's sorta funny, the skeptic movement is now finally old enough, it's like Scientology, we have second gen." She recounts how, "We would have family newsletter-stuffing nights (for the BC Skeptics)." Instead of hiring babysitters, her father would take Lindsay to his media interviews. "Does Satanic music cause suicide, out-of-body experiences... it was always something new and different."

James Alcock and Ray Hyman discussed their friendship with Beyerstein. Alcock stated that when he knew Barry was going to be staying at his house, he made a mental note of all the things that needed fixing around the house. "All I would have to do is look at what needed to be done and Barry would insist on fixing it right then." Hyman stated that Beyerstein was a polymath, he knew everything. Lindsay broke in and said, "Sports, he knew nothing about sports." "I didn't know that" stated Hyman, "Good to know he didn't know everything." He was a do-it-yourself kind of man; he and his wife Suzi built their home from the ground up together, and when he accidentally cut off the tip of his finger, "he sewed it back on."

He died suddenly at age 60 in his office on Burnaby Mountain, of an apparent heart attack.

== Publications ==
- – (1985). "The Myth of Alpha Consciousness". Skeptical Inquirer 10: 42–59.
- – (1987). "Neuroscience and Psi-ence". Behavioral and Brain Sciences 10: 571–572.
- – (1987–1988). "The Brain and Consciousness: Implications for Psi Phenomena". Skeptical Inquirer 12: 163–173.
- – (1988). "Neuropathology and the Legacy of Spiritual Possession". Skeptical Inquirer 12: 248–262.
- – (1990). "Brainscams: Neuromythologies of the New Age". International Journal of Mental Health 19: 27–36.
- – Hadaway, P. (1991). "On Avoiding Folly". Journal of Drug Issues 20: 689–700.
- – (1992). The Write Stuff: Evaluations of Graphology – The Study of Handwriting Analysis. Prometheus Books.
- – (1995). Distinguishing Science from Pseudoscience. Victoria, BC: The Center for Curriculum and Professional Development.
- – Sampson, W. (1996). Traditional Medicine and Pseudoscience in China. Skeptical Inquirer 20: 18–26.
- – (1996). Maria's Near-Death Experience: Waiting for the Other Shoe to Drop. Skeptical Inquirer 20: 27–33.
- – (1996). Altered States of Consciousness. In Gordon Stein. The Encyclopedia of the Paranormal. Prometheus Books. pp. 8–16.
- – (1996). Visions and Hallucinations. In Gordon Stein. The Encyclopedia of the Paranormal. Prometheus Books. pp. 789–797.
- – (1997). Why Bogus Therapies Seem to Work. Skeptical Inquirer 27: 29–34.
- – Downie, S. (1998). Naturopathy. The Scientific Review of Alternative Medicine 1: 10–18.
- – (1999). Social and Judgmental Biases That Make Inert Treatments Seem to Work. The Scientific Review of Alternative Medicine 3: 16–29.
- – (1999). Whence Cometh the Myth that We Only Use 10% of our Brains?. In Sergio Della Sala. Mind Myths: Exploring Popular Assumptions About the Mind and Brain. Wiley. pp. 3–24.
- – (1999). Pseudoscience and the Brain: Tuners and Tonics for Aspiring Superhumans. In Sergio Della Sala. Mind Myths: Exploring Everyday Mysteries of the Mind and Brain. Wiley. pp. 59–82.
- – (2001). Fringe Psychotherapies: The Public at Risk. The Scientific Review of Alternative Medicine 5: 70–79.
- – (2007). Graphology – a total write-off. In Sergio Della Sala. Tall Tales about the Mind and Brain: Separating Fact from Fiction. Oxford University Press. pp. 223–270.
- – (2007). The Neurology of the Weird: Brain States and Anomalous Experience. In Sergio Della Sala. Tall Tales about the Mind and Brain: Separating Fact from Fiction. Oxford University Press. pp. 314–335.
