= Loren Pankratz =

American psychologist (born 1940)

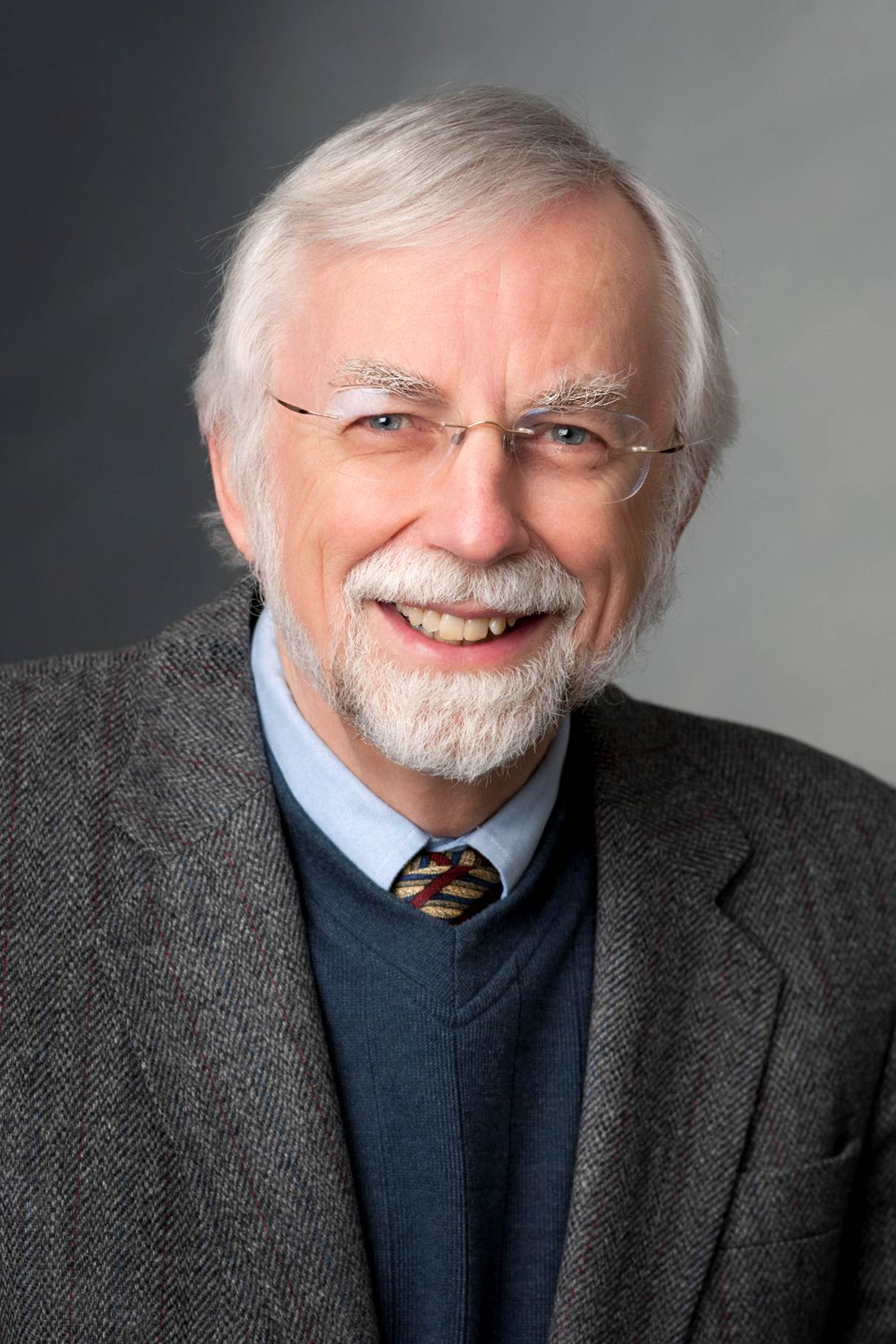
- Born: February 27, 1940 (age 86); Portland, Oregon U.S.
- Citizenship: American
- Education: Oregon State University BA 1962; University of Oregon PhD 1968
- Known for: Posttraumatic stress disorder Münchausen syndrome by proxy served on the False Memory Syndrome Foundation Scientific and Professional Advisory Board and is professor in the department of psychiatry at Oregon Health & Science University (OHSU).
- Scientific career
- Fields: Psychology
- Workplaces: Portland VA Medical Center; Oregon Health & Science University

Loren Pankratz (born February 27, 1940) is a consultation psychologist at the Portland VA Medical Center.

Following his retirement in 1995, he maintained a forensic practice until 2012. He testified nationally on cases of Münchausen syndrome by proxy (MBP), often defending mothers accused of harming their children.

He has written, lectured and spoke on a wide variety of unusual topics such as Early childhood abuse, dancing manias, spiritualism, Greek oracles, ghosts, plagues, historical enigmas, mesmerism, moral panics, con-games, self-deception, faith healing, self-surgery, miracles, ethical blunders, quackery, and renaissance science. He has also published magic history, magic tricks, and mentalism effects in magazines. Pankratz, along with Ray Hyman and Jerry Andrus, was a founding faculty member of the Skeptic's Toolbox in Eugene, Oregon. Pankratz is also a Fellow for the Committee for Skeptical Inquiry.

== Personal ==
Pankratz received his B.A. from Oregon State University in 1962 and his Ph.D. from the University of Oregon in 1968. He is a lifelong resident of Oregon.

In 2012, Pankratz constructed a display of historically significant books about quackery at the Oregon Health & Science University Library.

== Career ==
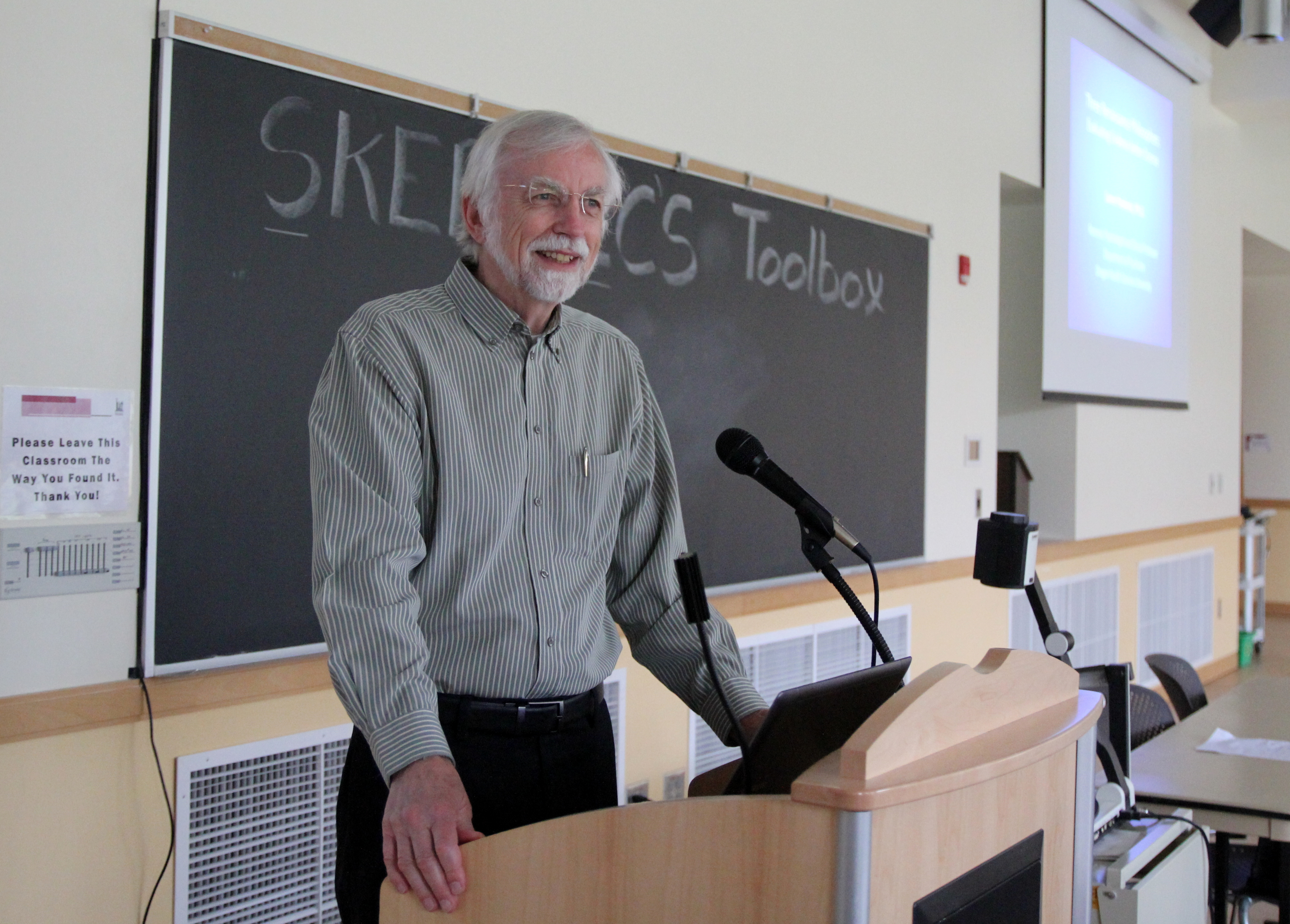
Loren Pankratz lectures at the Skeptic's Toolbox − 2012 "Three Renaissance Philosophers: Evaluating Evidence Before Science

Pankratz was a psychologist at the Portland VA Medical Center for 24 years. He was also responsible for psychiatry admissions, which gave him experience with emergency room physicians and procedures where he became aware of what he described in Summering in Oregon as false information that patients presented to clinicians.

In 1975, Pankratz became consultation psychologist for medical and surgical services where he remained until his early retirement in 1995. "The purpose of checking a veteran's story, of course, is not directed at catching lies but at identifying and treating the proper problem."

Pankratz was appointed professor in the psychiatry department at Oregon Health Sciences University (now Oregon Health & Science University) in 1989. After retirement, he became a clinical professor in the department of psychiatry.

As a reviewer for the American Journal of Psychiatry, Pankratz vetted potential publications on posttraumatic stress disorder (PTSD) in which he says some authors "merely gathered evidence for what they believed was true about symptoms and the underlying trauma". He said that many aspiring authors did not check outside facts, and patients told therapists what they wanted to hear.

In 1993, Pankratz was appointed to the scientific and professional advisory board of the False Memory Syndrome Foundation. He has written about the lack of documented evidence for repressed memory and the resistance in acknowledging this professional blunder.

As a representative of the FMSF, Pankratz participated in an interview with Mary Knight during her 2017 documentary Am I Crazy? My journey to determine if my memories are true. Pankratz claimed, in detail, that children who are victims of sexual abuse before the age of two have no memories of these occurrences. "A child under two really doesn't have memories of anything that happened. Anything that doesn't, that isn't painful, the child, it wouldn't...it wouldn't hurt the child. I mean it may be morally wrong to touch a child who's under two. It may be obnoxious. It may be...that's a terrible thing to do, and society says no, but if you think about it, it doesn't...it doesn't damage the child." [00:56:54] He argued that, as a result, there is no long-term effect or damage to childhood victims of non-violent abuse.

In 1984, Pankratz and two colleagues founded the Drug-Seeking Behavior Committee which turned the focus of drug abuse from addiction to the earlier problem of risk.

== Münchausen syndrome by proxy ==
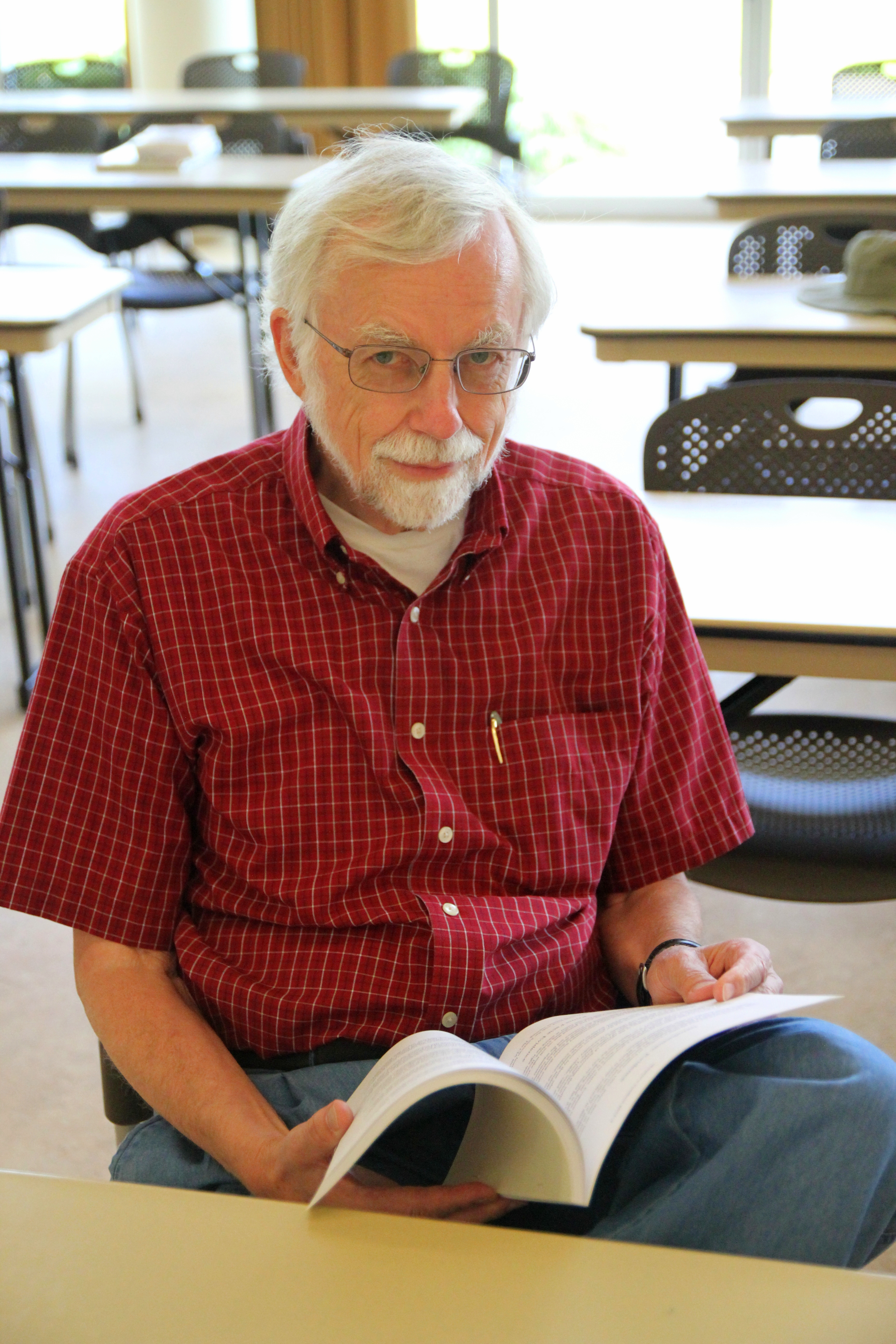
At Skeptic's Toolbox - 2012

Pankratz's articles on Münchausen syndrome by proxy discussed what he says is a problem of false accusations associated with the diagnosis. Pankratz concluded that "mothers who present the problems of their children in ways perceived as unusual or problematic have become entangled in legal battles that should have been resolved clinically". In the majority of cases he reviewed, the mothers "were well meaning but inappropriately concerned about the health of their children, or their behavior was problematic in other ways". In an interview with Psychology Today Pankratz stated "I have seen mothers accused of MBP simply because physicians disagreed about the medical management of their child..." it is "vastly overdiagnosed."

After a contentious case in Pennsylvania, Pankratz told the Pittsburgh Post-Gazette that the accused mother was not creating medical symptoms in her children. Often called in as expert testimony, Pankratz stated, "for 30 years... (I have) been hired by prosecutors, defense attorneys, insurance companies and the Roman Catholic Church as an expert in medical deception." In his opinion, the mother had not created medical symptoms in her children. Instead, the symptoms were caused by a mitochondrial disorder, an uncommon condition that is difficult to diagnose. The children were returned to the care of the mother.

== Publications ==
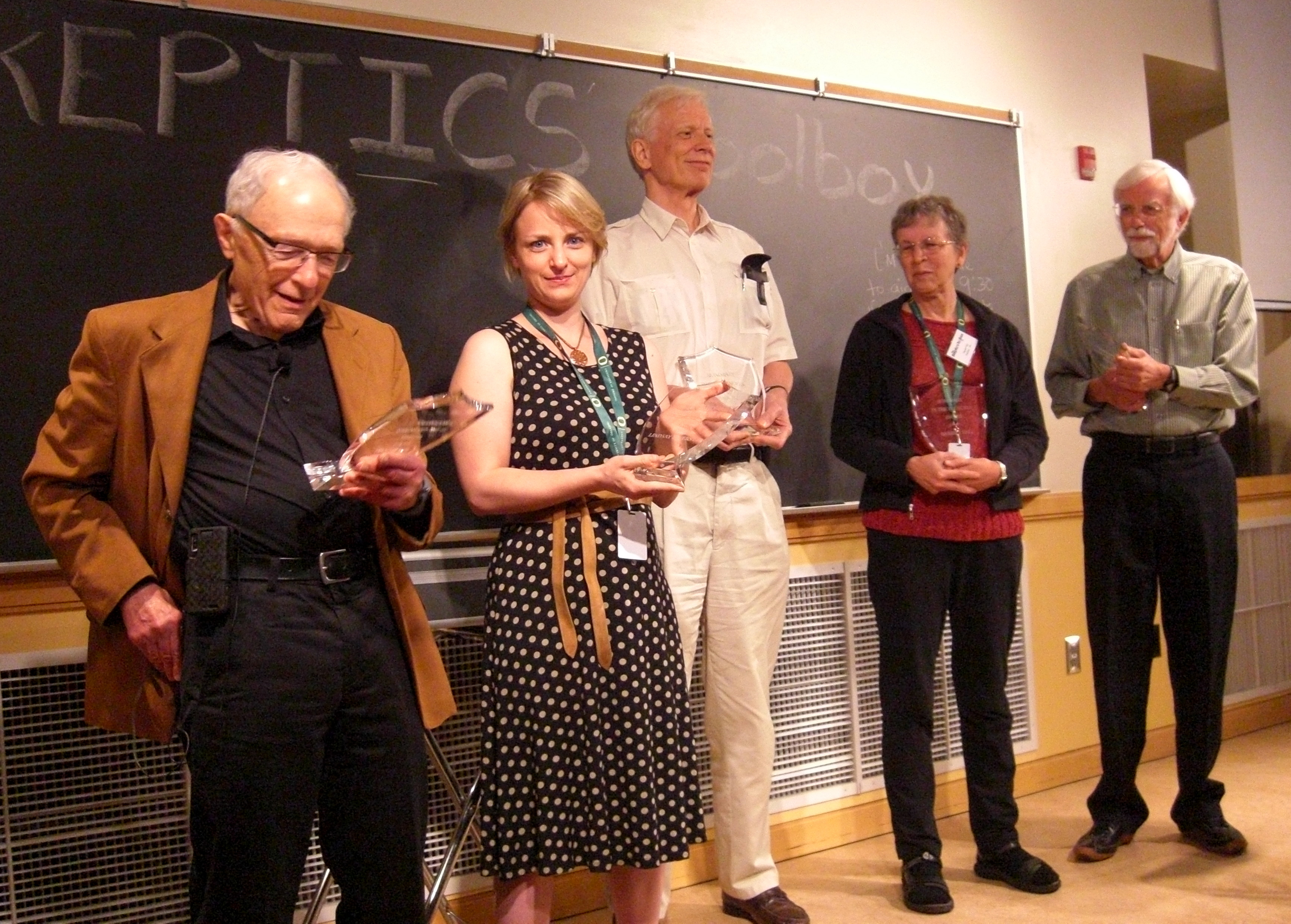
Each of the faculty of 2012's Skeptic's Toolbox are presented by Carl and Ben Baumgartner, with an honorary In The Trenches award. Ray Hyman, Lindsay Beyerstein, James Alcock, Harriet Hall and Loren Pankratz

Pankratz published Patients Who Deceive in 1998 which is part of the Charles Thomas Behavioral Science and Law series. Reviewer Phillip Resnick wrote that Pankratz clearly explains the difference between a malingerer (someone who wants to appear sick) and a person with factitious disorder who wants to be sick (even when no one is watching). Resnick says the book showcases "many dramatic examples of creating illusions of illness." Pankratz and psychiatrist Landy Sparr described factitious posttraumatic stress disorder in 1983, saying the stories of trauma always require external verification. In November 2021, a revised edition of Patients Who Deceive was published with KDP and is available on Amazon in print and ebook. It will be available on iBooks shortly.

Pankratz described forced-choice testing as a strategy for the assessment of malingering related to any sensory deficit. He later expanded forced-choice testing to assess malingering on neuropsychological assessment.

In the Journal of the American Medical Association (JAMA), Pankratz published an article on the assessment and treatment of "geezers". The Los Angeles Times review said geezers, "are never more misunderstood than when, laid low by medical problems they can't shake themselves, they are forced to swallow their pride and go to the doctor." The Times quoted Pankratz's article, "So all the medical profession can do is wait for the geezer to appear, on his own time and his own terms. If eccentric older men can be approached with interest, understanding and respect, half the battle is won—and the war may be avoided."

In 2021 Pankratz's book Mysteries and Secrets Revealed: From Oracles at Delphi to Spiritualism in America was published by Prometheus books.
