= Rudy Coby =

American comedic magician (born 1964)

- Born: Rudolph Coby; April 22, 1964 (age 61); New York City, New York, United States
- Other names: Labman
- Occupation: Comedic magician
- Years active: 1976–present
- Website: www.rudycoby.com

Rudy Coby (born Rudolph Coby; April 22, 1964), also known as "Labman", is an American comedic magician. He is a member of the Magic Castle in Los Angeles. In the early 1990s, Coby appeared in several small theatrical live shows, and on broadcast television. He is known for delivering electric and original comedic performances, of which stage magic plays a large part. He also works closely with rock musician and film director Marilyn Manson.

In the mid-1990s, Coby and his troupe of illusionist comrades performed in the Gem Theatre in downtown Detroit for an unprecedented thirteen weeks. Coby also published a bundle of lecture notes, titled "How To Become A World Famous Magician".

After a hiatus of 14 years, Coby returned to performing in 2009, including a twelve-week run between June 13 – September 7 at the Galaxy Theater at Valleyfair, a theme park in Minneapolis. In 2012, he performed on the YouTube episode of America's Got Talent during its seventh season, but did not advance to the semifinals.

== Work with Marilyn Manson ==
Coby is known to have worked with Manson from 2003, initially developing new material as well as stage magic. Coby designed much of Manson's set and props for stage shows including The Last Tour on Earth. He has also been Manson's roommate; his room being used as part of the cover of the album Eat Me, Drink Me with this news released as some of the first promotional information regarding Manson's track, Devour, from the 2009 album The High End of Low.

When Rudy Coby did a revival of his stage show in 2010, Marilyn Manson played the role of his nemesis.

== Performances ==
Coby plays an alter ego, "Labman", a scientist who performs amazing deeds. Labman works for a fictional company, "LabCo", with the slogan "Smarter Than You". Labman was earlier featured as a comic book character made up by Coby as a child and also made into a publicity pamphlet. Since doing the TV shows, Coby published several comics featuring the enigmatic hero. Coby's 'four legs' act is said to have inspired the director of the French film, Delicatessen (film), to include a multi-legged hero in the film after reportedly seeing him on Patrick Sebastien's early show, "Sebastien, c'est Fou!". Coby also contributed sections of "Labman" material to Gladiators 2000, a children's version of American Gladiators, in 1995. Coby's TV specials and live performances often feature several characters, including his robotic female assistant, Nikki Terminator, his sidekick, Atom, and others. Two TV specials were filmed, in 1995 and 1996.

=== Rudy Coby: The Coolest Magician on Earth (1995) ===
This TV special was first screened in the USA on 21 May 1995. Coby's first show begins with a general display of magic, timed to music. Rudy then performs several tricks, some with audience participation, before "accidentally" cutting his assistant Nikki Terminator in half with a chainsaw. A lengthy plot ensues, in which Rudy, as Labman, searches for replacement legs for Nikki and a way to reattach them.

He then attempts to "dethrone Harry Houdini" by performing "The World's Most Dangerous Card Trick". The trick is ultimately a joke, hyped up to humorous levels. Coby selects a child from the audience, gets him to select a card at random, and wires himself up to a cardboard bomb (telling the volunteer not to be "fooled by its cheesy cardboard-like appearance"). He tells the volunteer to detonate the bomb at an appropriate time, and after deliberately fudging up the times, gets set on fire but eventually produces the correct card, proving himself to be "The Coolest Magician on Earth".

=== Rudy Coby: Ridiculously Dangerous (1996) ===
This TV special was first screened in the USA on May 6, 1996. The show's highlights are Labman's superheroic struggles with crime. The show introduces a number of supervillains, including 'The Hourglass' – who turns out to be Labman's ex-girlfriend! Others include "Magic Dave", a thinly disguised parody of David Copperfield. Rudy deals with each of the supervillains by besting them in a magic trick.

== Notable illusions ==
One device used in both shows is LabCo's "Hypnotron 2000", an animated optical illusion (designed by Jerry Andrus) in which concentric rings of black/white stripes rotate in alternating directions. Coby shows this animation for about fifteen seconds, and then instructs viewers to look at a photograph, or the back of their hand, to see the object they look at appear to distort in front of their eyes. This device is a well-known example of the motion aftereffect. The Hypnotron 2000 was reportedly so popular in the first show that Coby had to perform it again in the second.
