= Anthony Pratkanis =

American psychologist (born 1957)

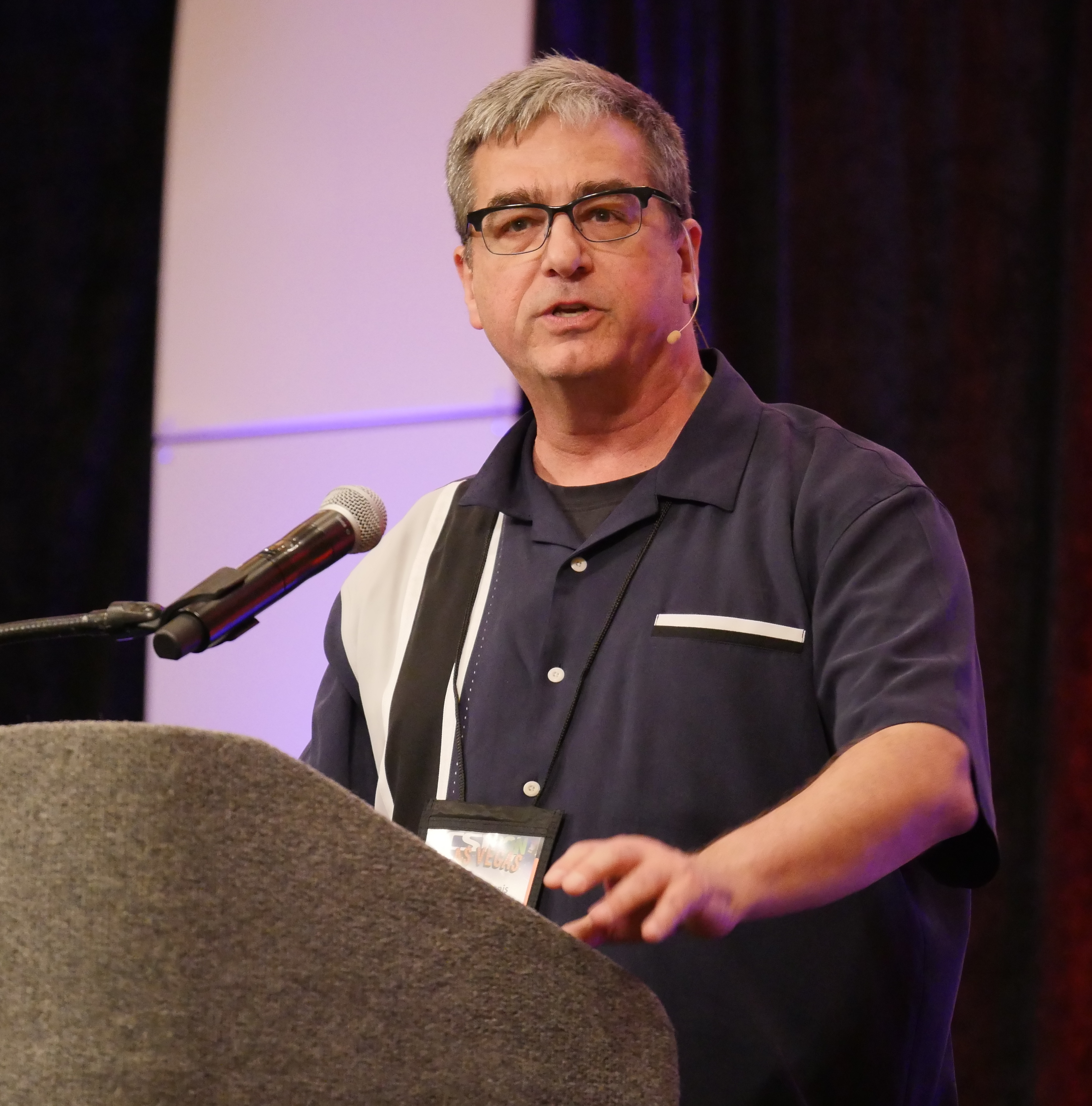
- CSICon 2016
- Born: April 2, 1957 (age 69); Portsmouth, Virginia
- Education: Ohio State University, Eastern Mennonite University
- Known for: Propaganda expert
- Awards: 2006 UCSC's Excellence in Teaching Award; Eastern Mennonite University Distinguished Alumnus 2009; 2002 Telly Award
- Scientific career
- Fields: Psychology
- Workplaces: Carnegie Mellon University, University of California, Santa Cruz

Anthony R. Pratkanis is a researcher, author, consultant, media commentator and a professor emeritus of psychology at the University of California, Santa Cruz. He is the author of several books, and has published research papers in scientific journals on the topics of social influence, fraud, terrorist and dictator propaganda, marketing and consumer behavior, and subliminal persuasion.

Pratkanis has been a consultant for civic groups, government agencies, regulatory organizations, law enforcement, and the United States Military. He has given expert testimony in many trials, and is often cited in the mainstream news media.

In 2004 Pratkanis received an excellence in teaching award and was named the most revered professor by the psychology class of 2005.

== Early life and education ==
Pratkanis was born on April 2, 1957, in Portsmouth Virginia. In 1979 Pratkanis graduated from Eastern Mennonite College with a Bachelor of Science in psychology, sociology and social work. Following that he went to Ohio State University and earned his Master of Science and Ph.D. in 1984. Pratkanis interests are applied social psychology; attitudes and beliefs; communication, language; group processes; intergroup relations; persuasion, social influence; prejudice and stereotyping.

== Personal life ==
Pratkanis is married to Marlene Turner Pratkanis and they have a son, Tony Turner Pratkanis.

== Career ==
=== Teaching ===
Pratkanis commenced his teaching career at Carnegie Mellon University in 1984 where he taught courses in advertising and, human behaviour. In 1987 he moved to the University of California, Santa Cruz, where he took up the position of Professor in the Psychology Department of the Social Services Division where he teaches four courses – Introduction to Social Psychology, Social Influence, Social Psychology of Autocracy and Democracy, and Social Psychology of Flim Flam. Pratkanis received the UCSC Excellence in Teaching Award for his courses Social Influence and Social Psychology, and was named the Psychology Class of 2005 Most Revered Professor.

Outside of the university, Pratkanis presented lectures on social influence at skeptical conferences including SkeptiCal, CSICon, and the Skeptic's Toolbox.

=== Research ===
Pratkanis' research interest is “social influence – how the social world determines attitudes and beliefs and how, in turn, those individual beliefs affect the social world." His research program has investigated such topics as the delayed effects of persuasion, attitudes and memory, groupthink, affirmative action, subliminal influence, persuasion and democracy, and influence tactics such as the pique technique, phantoms, the projection tactic, the 1-in-5 prize tactic, expert snare, and altercasting. Pratkanis is listed as a co-author on 15 papers published in scientific journals, and is a founding editor of the Journal Social Influence, first published in 2006. He is an editor of Attitude Structure and Function, The Science of Social Influence, past editor of The Journal of Social Psychology, and a past associate editor for the Journal of Consumer Psychology. His research papers have been translated into 10 different languages.

=== Author ===
As well as being the co-author of a number of scientific papers and editor of journals, Pratkanis is the co-author or editor of 6 books. He is best known for the best selling books Age of Propaganda: The Everyday Use and Abuse of Persuasion co-authored with Elliott Aronson; which has been translated into Chinese, Japanese, Spanish; and Weapons of Fraud: A Source Book For Fraud Fighters, co-written with AARP state director Doug Shadel, which accompanies the award-winning AARP video of the same name.

=== Consulting ===
Pratkanis has consulted for civic groups, government and law enforcement agencies, regulatory bodies and the United States Military. In 2002 he won a Telly award for his work as a scientific consultant on the AARP video Weapons of Fraud, aimed at reducing the number of senior Americans becoming victims of scams. He has worked with the U.S. Securities and Exchange Commission, FINRA (formerly NASD), and law enforcement agencies on strategies for preventing economic Fraud crimes. The United States Military has enlisted Pratkanis to assist with countering Propaganda of terrorists and dictators, and reducing conflict in war zones. He has also assisted the National Association of Attorneys General's Tobacco Litigation Group as an expert on consumer behaviour.

He has given expert testimony before the special senate enquiries into ageing and the U.S. Securities and Exchange Commission on what can be done to prevent economic Fraud. He has appeared as an expert witness in a number of court cases including the trials of CBS Records/Judas Priest on subliminal communication; the state of California against MCI/Worldcom, and Cingular Wireless; and the state of Vermont against R. J. Reynolds Tobacco Company.

=== Media ===
Pratkanis is often cited in the mainstream news media on presidential campaigns, Fraud, social influence, war and Propaganda. In 1995 he appeared on Oprah Winfrey's television show as an expert on social influence. He has been quoted or cited by The New York Times, the Los Angeles Times, The Washington Post, CNN, Dateline NBC, and CBS News and the South China Morning Post – the largest English speaking Hong Kong Newspaper.

== Other interests ==
Pratkanis is an amateur magician and a member of the International Brotherhood of Magicians and the Society of American Magicians. He uses magic tricks such as cold reading and levitation in his course, The Social Psychology of Flim Flam, as an effective way to teach critical thinking; proving to his students that even their college professor can fool them.

== Fellowships and awards ==
- Fellow of the American Psychological Association.
- Fellow of the Association for Psychological Science.
- Fellow of the Committee for Skeptical Inquiry.
- 2002 Telly Award for work as a scientific consultant on the AARP Video "Weapons of Fraud."
- 2003/2004 UCSC Excellence in Teaching Award for his courses in Social Influence and Social Psychology.

== Selected publications ==
=== Books ===
- Pratkanis, A. R. (Eds.). (2007). The Science of Social Influence: Advances and Future Progress. Frontiers of Social Psychology. Philadelphia, PA: Psychology Press.
- Pratkanis, A. R. & Shadel, D. (2005). Weapons of Fraud: A Source Book For Fraud Fighters. Washington, D.C.: AARP Washington.
- Pratkanis, A. R., & Aronson, E. (2001). Age of Propaganda: The Everyday Use and Abuse of Persuasion (rev. ed.). New York: W. H. Freeman & Co.
- Turner, M. E. & PratKanis, A. R. (1994). Social Psychological Perspectives on Affirmative Action: A Special Issue of Basic and Applied Social Psychology. Philadelphia, PA: Psychology Press.
- Aronson, E. & Pratkanis, A. R. (1993). Social Psychology. (Vol. 2). Edward Elgar Pub.
- Pratkanis, A. R., Breckler, S. J., & Greenwald, A. G. (1989). Attitude Structure and Function. Philadelphia, PA: Psychology Press.

=== Journal articles ===
- Pratkanis, A. R. & Uriel, Y. (2011). The expert snare as an influence tactic: Surf, turf, and ballroom demonstrations of some compliance consequences of being altercast as an expert. Current Psychology: A Journal for Diverse Perspectives on Diverse Psychological Issues, 30(4), 335–344.
- Horvitz, T., & Pratkanis, A. R. (2002). A laboratory demonstration of the fraudulent telemarketers' 1-in-5 prize tactic. Journal of Applied Social Psychology, 32(2), 310–317.
- Rucker, D. D., & Pratkanis, A. R. (2001). Projection as an interpersonal influence tactic: The effects of the pot calling the kettle black. Personality & Social Psychology Bulletin, 27(11), 1494–1507.
- Pratkanis, A. R., & Turner, M. E. (1999). The significance of affirmative action for the souls of white folk: Further implications of a helping model. Journal of Social Issues, 55(4), 787–815.
- Turner, M. E., & Pratkanis, A. R. (1998). A social identity maintenance model of groupthink. Organizational Behavior and Human Decision Processes, 73(2–3), 210–235.
- Turner, M. E., & Pratkanis, A. R. (1998). Twenty-five years of groupthink theory and research: Lessons from the evaluation of a theory. Organizational Behavior and Human Decision Processes, 73(23), 105–115.
- Pratkanis, A. R., & Turner, M. E. (1996). Persuasion and democracy: Strategies for increasing deliberative participation and enacting social change. Journal of Social Issues, 52(1), 187–205.
- Pratkanis, A. R., & Turner, M. E. (1996). The proactive removal of discriminatory barriers: Affirmative action as effective help. Journal of Social Issues, 52(4), 111–132.
- Pratkanis, A. R., Eskenazi, J., & Greenwald, A. G. (1994). What you expect is what you believe (but not necessarily what you get): A test of the effectiveness of subliminal self-help audiotapes. Basic & Applied Social Psychology, 15(3), 251–276.
- Santos, M. D., Leve, C., & Pratkanis, A. R. (1994). Hey buddy, can you spare seventeen cents? Mindful persuasion and the pique technique. Journal of Applied Social Psychology, 24(9), 755–764.
- Pratkanis, A. R., & Greenwald, A. G. (1993). Consumer involvement, message attention, and the persistence of persuasive impact in a message-dense environment. Psychology & Marketing, 10(4), 321–332.
- Pratkanis, A. R., & Farquhar, P. H. (1992). A brief history of research on phantom alternatives: Evidence for seven empirical generalizations about phantoms. Basic & Applied Social Psychology, 13(1), 103–122.
- Turner, M. E., Pratkanis, A. R., Probasco, P., & Leve, C. (1992). Threat, cohesion, and group effectiveness: Testing a social identity maintenance perspective on groupthink. Journal of Personality and Social Psychology, 63(5), 781.
- Greenwald, A. G., Spangenberg, E. R., Pratkanis, A. R., & Eskenazi, J. (1991). Double-blind tests of subliminal self-help audiotapes. Psychological Science, 2(2), 119–122.
- Greenwald, A. G., & Pratkanis, A. R. (1988). On the use of "theory" and the usefulness of theory. Psychological Review, 95(4), 575–579.
