= Jerry Andrus =

American magician and writer (1918–2007)

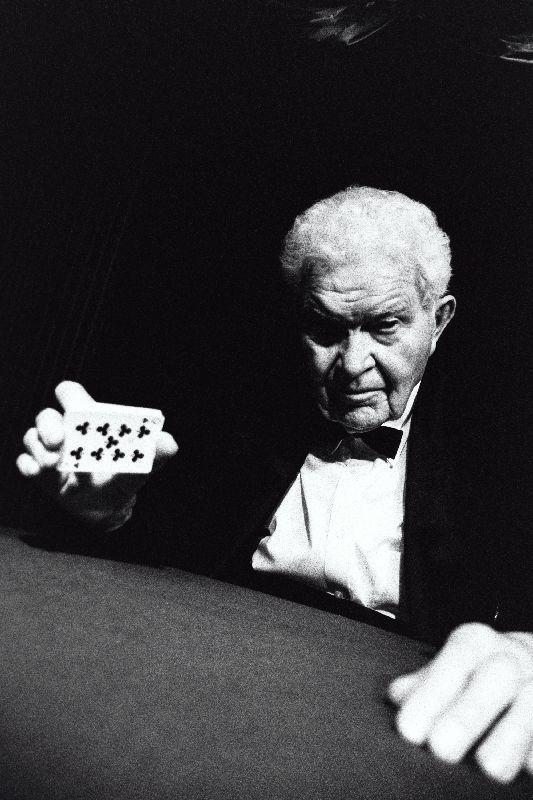
- Andrus performing at The Magic Castle in Hollywood, California
- Born: January 28, 1918; Sheridan, Wyoming, U.S.
- Died: August 26, 2007 (aged 89); Albany, Oregon, U.S.
- Education: Self-taught
- Occupations: Magician, writer, inventor, scientific skeptic
- Known for: Creator of world-renowned magic tricks and optical illusions

Jerry Andrus (January 28, 1918 – August 26, 2007) was an American magician and writer known internationally for his original close-up, sleight of hand tricks, such as the famous "Linking Pins", and optical illusions.

== Early life ==
Andrus was born January 28, 1918, in Sheridan, Wyoming. At the age of 10, he moved to Albany, Oregon, where he lived until his death in 2007. At 12, Andrus became interested in the art of illusion when he saw a performance of a reformed "spiritual medium". He joined the International Society of Junior Magicians when he was 16 and soon became known as a "magician’s magician".

== Career ==
=== Magic ===
A self-taught magician, Andrus preferred to develop his own style rather than learn the craft as traditionally handed down from other magicians, eventually becoming world renowned as one of the "best and most-influential 'close-up magic' performers ever." He was known to many accomplished contemporary magicians, such as Lance Burton, Doug Henning, and Penn & Teller, for this unique brand of close-up, sleight-of-hand magic.

International card magicians knew Andrus for his "Master Move", a sleight-of-hand classic "pass" without "necessary false movement".

An early member of The Magic Castle in Hollywood, California, Andrus performed there semi-annually until shortly before his death.

=== Illusions ===
Andrus created his illusions in his Oregon home, which he nicknamed "The Castle of Chaos" in reference to the numerous items he collected over the years with the hope of using them to "make something spectacular".

In 1954, Andrus created the famous "Linking Pins", a close-up illusion in which closed safety pins are rapidly linked together in twos, threes and chains.

=== Skepticism ===
Andrus was committed to the promotion of science and warned of the dangers of pseudoscience, psychics, cons, and other deceptions. An avowed scientific skeptic and agnostic, Andrus often lectured at scientific and skeptic conferences, using his optical illusions and magic tricks to demonstrate the ease with which the mind can be fooled by the eye. He discussed a form of cognitive science that attempted to explain that because the mind is working on an unconscious level, it can be fooled into misperceiving apparently normal sensory experiences.

== List of works ==
=== Books and lecture notes ===
- Andrus Deals You in (1956)
- Sleightly Miraculous (1961)
- Special Magic (lecture notes for 1974 Japan Tour) (1974)
- More Sleightly Slanted (lecture notes) (1977)
- Andrus Card Control (with Ray Hyman) (2000)
- Kurious Kards and $5 Trix (2001)
- Safety Pin-Trix

=== Videos/DVDs ===
- Jerry Andrus: A Lifetime of Magic – Volume 1 (2001)
- Jerry Andrus: A Lifetime of Magic – Volume 2 (2001)
- Jerry Andrus: A Lifetime of Magic – Volume 3 (2001)

== Media ==
=== Documentaries ===
- A Thing of Wonder: The Mind & Matter of Jerry Andrus (2002)
- Andrus: The Man, The Mind and the Magic (2008)

== See also ==
- James Randi
- Rudy Coby
