= Wallace Sampson =

American doctor and consumer advocate

- Born: March 29, 1930; Hollywood, California
- Died: May 25, 2015 (aged 85); Los Altos, California

Wallace Sampson (March 29, 1930 – May 25, 2015), also known as Wally, was an American medical doctor and consumer advocate in opposition to alternative medicine and other fraud schemes. He was an authority in numerous medical fields, including oncology, hematology, and pathology. He was emeritus professor of clinical medicine at Stanford University. He was the former head of medical oncology at Santa Clara Valley Medical Center, and a member of the faculty at the Skeptic's Toolbox 1998–2008.

== Scientific skepticism ==
Sampson was an international expert in exposing pseudoscience-based fraudulent schemes in medicine and other fields, such as alternative medicine, integrative medicine, traditional Chinese medicine, acupuncture, and chiropractic. He publicized the expression "antiscience" to refer to the basis of belief in alternative medicine in his title for a peer-reviewed paper published by the New York Academy of Sciences – "Antiscience Trends in the Rise of the 'Alternative Medicine' Movement". He taught the Stanford University School of Medicine Alternative Medicine course regarding "unscientific medical systems and aberrant medical claims". The San Francisco Chronicle quotes him as saying "We've looked into most of the practices and, biochemically or physically, their supposed effects lie somewhere between highly improbable and impossible."

He was a founding editor of the Scientific Review of Alternative Medicine, former chair of the board of directors of the National Council against Health Fraud, former chair of the State of California Cancer Advisory Council (advisory board on health fraud schemes), and consulted on medical fraud and other fraud schemes for the Medical Board of California, Association of State Medical Boards, California State Attorney General, US Postal Service, multiple district attorneys, and multiple insurance companies. Sampson has published numerous academic papers in various medical fields, as well as popular works including for the Saturday Evening Post. He was also a fellow of the Committee for Skeptical Inquiry (CSI). In April 2011 the executive council of CSI selected Sampson for inclusion in the CSI Pantheon of Skeptics. The Pantheon of Skeptics was created by CSI to remember the legacy of deceased fellows of CSI and their contributions to the cause of scientific skepticism.

He was an editor of the scientific skepticism website Science-Based Medicine.

In a eulogy for Sampson, friend Harriet Hall wrote that she owes her own career in skepticism to Sampson. He is the person that encouraged her to write about pseudoscience topics, and learn how to evaluate claims. She had met him at the Skeptic's Toolbox where he was a part of the faculty. When he decided to step down from that lecture position she was the person who was asked to replace him. Hall reports that Sampson first became interested in writing about skepticism topics when his patients kept asking about using Laetrile to treat cancer. He researched the topic and found that it was a bogus claim.
