= Scientific Review of Alternative Medicine =

- Discipline: Alternative medicine
- Language: English
- Edited by: Wallace Sampson

Publication details
- History: 1997–2007
- Publisher: Commission for Scientific Medicine and Mental Health (United States)
- Open access: Yes

Standard abbreviations
- ISO 4: Sci. Rev. Altern. Med.

Indexing
- ISSN: 1095-0656
- LCCN: 98642211
- OCLC no.: 37478842

Links
- Journal homepage; Online archive

The Scientific Review of Alternative Medicine (SRAM) is a discontinued peer-reviewed medical journal published by the Commission for Scientific Medicine and Mental Health. It was established by Wallace Sampson (Stanford University) and Paul Kurtz (Committee for the Scientific Investigation of Claims of the Paranormal) and claimed to be "the only peer-reviewed journal devoted exclusively to objectively analyzing the claims of 'alternative medicine.'"

The journal's website stated:

The purpose of the Scientific Review of Alternative Medicine is to apply the best tools of science and reason to determine whether hypotheses are valid and treatments are effective. It will reject no claims because it fits, or fails to fit, some paradigm. It will simply seek justified answers to two questions: "Is it true?" and "Does this treatment work?"

A statement "In Defence of Scientific Medicine," welcoming the founding of the journal, was signed by a long list of notable individuals, including five Nobel laureates. The statement expressed skepticism towards alternative medicine and the need for "objective, scientific critiques" of the field.

The journal was evaluated at least three times by the National Library of Medicine (NLM) for indexing in MEDLINE, but rejected each time. In an editorial published on the journal's site, Sampson says that NLM director Donald Lindberg revealed that the first review of the journal had been performed by fourteen individuals or organizations who support alternative medicine. Sampson contends that, because the journal critically examines alternative medicine, such a panel of reviewers would not be able to objectively consider the journal. According to Sampson, the only information he received regarding the third review was that it was conducted by National Institutes of Health independent reviewers. Sampson states, "This was not what we had in mind when requesting outside review, as there was no assurance that the reviewers were either objective or authorities in pseudoscience."

The journal should not be confused with the Alternative Medicine Review (AMR), another peer-reviewed medical journal founded in 1996.
