= List of prizes for evidence of the paranormal =

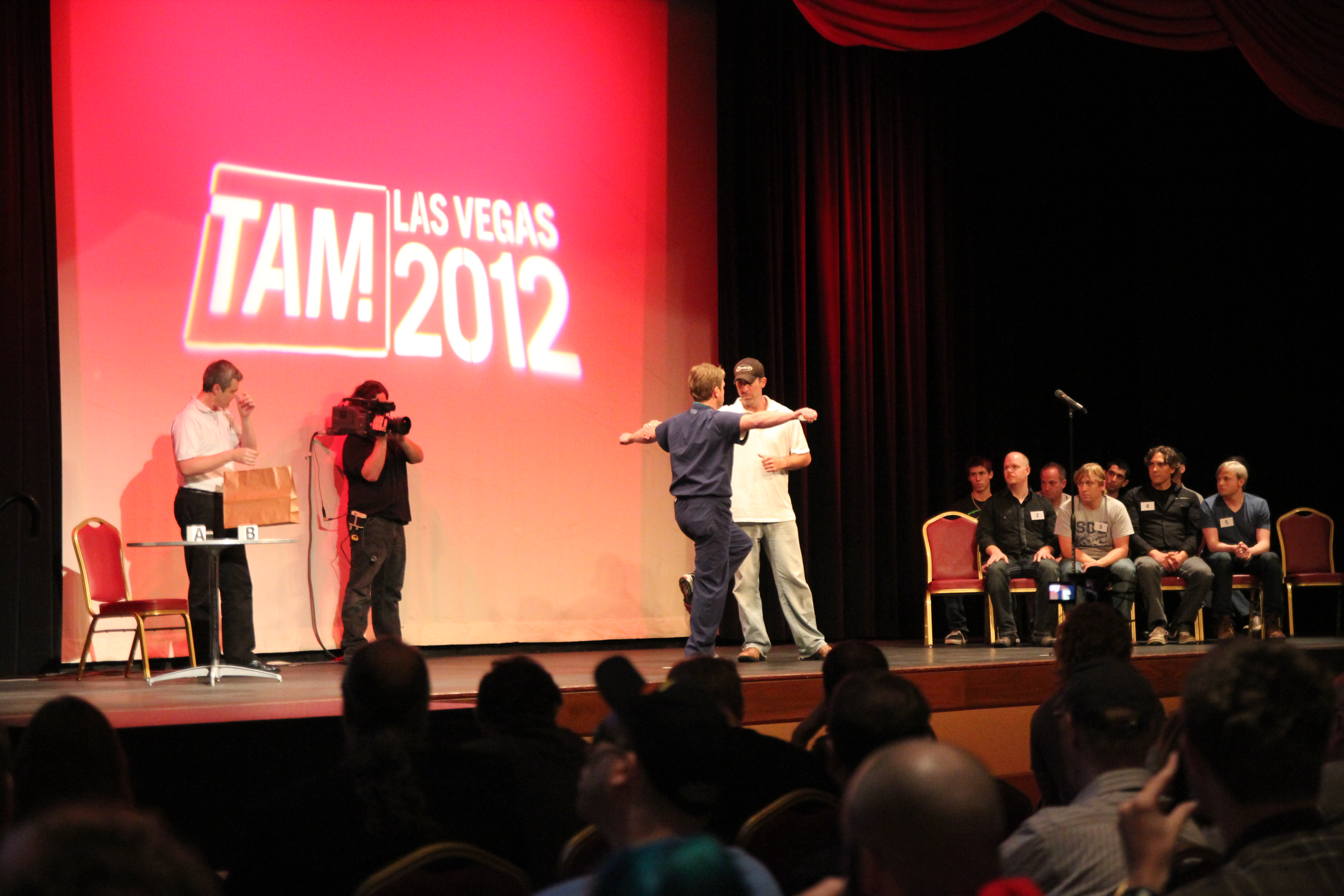
Could a wristband product improve a person's balance? A pre-test of the One Million Dollar Paranormal Challenge during TAM 2012.

Paranormal challenges, often posed by groups or individuals who self-identify as skeptics or rationalists, publicly challenge those who claim to possess paranormal abilities to demonstrate that they in fact possess them, and are not fraudulent or self-deceptive.

== Process ==
The Czech Skeptics' Club Sisyfos offers €125,000 to anyone who can prove paranormal phenomena.

After establishing procedures and measures of success agreed upon beforehand between the challengers and the claimants, a challenge is usually divided into two steps. The first is a "preliminary test", or "pre-test", where claimants can show their purported abilities under controlled conditions in front of a small audience, before being admitted to the final test. Sometimes these pre-tests have a smaller prize attached to them. Several local organisations have set up challenges that serve as pre-tests to larger prizes such as the JREF's One Million Dollar Paranormal Challenge or the 2012–2013 SKEPP Sisyphus Prize (for one million euros).

== History ==
In 1922, Scientific American made two US$2,500 offers: (1) for the first authentic spirit photograph made under test conditions, and (2) for the first psychic to produce a "visible psychic manifestation." Harry Houdini was a member of the investigating committee. The first medium to be tested was George Valiantine, who claimed that in his presence spirits would speak through a trumpet that floated around a darkened room. For the test, Valiantine was placed in a room, the lights were extinguished, but unbeknownst to him his chair had been rigged to light a signal in an adjoining room if he left his seat. Because the light signals were tripped during his performance - indicating that he did leave his seat multiple times, sometimes for up to eighteen seconds - Valiantine was confirmed to be a fraud, and did not collect the award money.

Since then, many individuals and groups have offered similar monetary awards for proof of the paranormal in an observed setting. Indian rationalist Abraham Kovoor's challenge in 1963 inspired American skeptic James Randi's prize in 1964, which became the One Million Dollar Paranormal Challenge. In 2003, these prizes were calculated to have a combined value of US$2,326,500. As of December 2023, none of the prizes have been awarded, as no proof of paranormal has been provided.

In 2015, James Randi ceased to accept public applications directly from people claiming to have paranormal powers. As of 2018, these prizes combine to approximately US$1,024,215. They take place in multiple countries and the conditions to be met may vary considerably. As of January 2024, none of the prizes have been claimed.

== List of standing prizes ==
Date	Location	Challengers	Offered prize	Equivalent in U.S. dollars	Details	Status
2014–	Czech Republic	Czech Skeptics' Club Sisyfos	3,515,000 Czech koruna	$160,671	To anyone who can prove to possess paranormal abilities in areas such as clairvoyance, telepathy, telekinesis, rhabdomancy, etc.	Unclaimed
1999–	China	Sima Nan	1,000,000 Chinese yuan	$157,913	"[T]o anyone who can perform one act of "special ability” without cheating."	Unclaimed
1984–	India	Tarksheel Society	10,000,000 Indian rupees	$150,110	To anyone who can perform any of 22 specified "miracles". The entry fee is 10,000 INR.	Unclaimed
2000–	United States	Center for Inquiry Investigations Group	500,000 US dollars	$500,000	"...to anyone who can demonstrate any paranormal, supernatural, or occult power under scientific test conditions." The person who refers a successful applicant to the CFIIG earns $5,000 as well.	Unclaimed
1980–	Australia	Australian Skeptics	100,000 Australian dollars	$75,820	For proof of the existence of extrasensory perception, telepathy, or telekinesis.	Unclaimed
1985–	India	Science and Rationalists' Association of India, Prabir Ghosh	5,000,000 Indian rupees	$75,055	Prabir Ghosh will award the prize "to any person of this world who can demonstrate his/her supernormal power by performing any one of the following activities without taking help of any hoax/trick at my designated place and circumstances."	Unclaimed
2000–	Italy	Alfredo Barrago's Bet	50,000 Euro	$60,737	"[...] shown at least a 'phenomenon' produced by 'medium, seers, sensitive etc.' of paranormal nature."	Unclaimed
2002–	Belgium	SKEPP Sisyphus Prize	25,000 Euro	$30,368	The original Sisyphus Prize was €10,000. Between 2012 and 2013, for the duration of one year, an anonymous Antwerp businessman raised the prize €1,000,000, while several European skeptical organisations attached their pre-tests to it. Afterwards, the regular Sisyphus Prize was continued and raised from €10,000 to €25,000.	Unclaimed
2013–	Great Britain	Association for Skeptical Enquiry	12,000 British pounds	$16,535	For proof of psychic powers.	Unclaimed
2015–	Russia	Harry Houdini Prize	1,000,000 Russian rubles	$16,096	The prize is awarded for demonstrating paranormal or supernatural abilities under conditions scientifically valid experiment.	Unclaimed
2001–	United States	North Texas Skeptics	12,000 US dollars	$12,000	"[T]o any person ... who can demonstrate any psychic or paranormal power or ability under scientifically valid observing conditions."	Unclaimed
1997–	Great Britain	Lavkesh Prasha, Asian Rationalist Society of Britain	10,000 British pounds	$13,779	"[T]o any person who could prove to possess magical powers before the media and scientists." The initial amount of £2,000 was increased fivefold in 2006 to attract more applicants.	Unclaimed
2008–	Estonia	Eesti Skeptik	10,000 Euro	$12,147	To anyone who can prove paranormal abilities.	Unclaimed
2004–	Germany	GWUP	10,000 Euro	$12,147	To anyone who can prove paranormal abilities.	Unclaimed
1989–	Finland	Skepsis ry (Finnish Association of Skeptics)	10,000 Euro	$12,147	For anybody in Finland who can produce paranormal phenomena under satisfactory observing conditions or prove that she/he/it is an extraterrestrial by providing a DNA (or equivalent) sample for investigation. Money partially from astronomer Hannu Karttunen and magician Iiro Seppänen.	Unclaimed
1988–	Netherlands	Stichting Skepsis	10,000 Euro	$12,147	To anyone who wants their "alternative diagnoses" (including applied kinesiology, electroacupuncture, bioresonance therapy, Therapeutic Touch, observing auras, clairvoyance, iridology, pendulum dowsing, astrology) to be tested; winning the pre-test earns €500. Skepsis' first challenge in March 1988 was ƒ10,000 to any "psychic surgeon" who could remove chairman Cornelis de Jager's appendix.	Unclaimed
Unknown–	Sweden	Swedish Humanist Association	100,000 Swedish krona	$11,550	To anyone who can demonstrate a paranormal or supernatural ability for which no scientific explanation can be found.	Unclaimed
1996–	Canada	Les Sceptiques du Quebec	10,000 Canadian dollars	$7785	"Just a small fact, observable or verifiable through experiment" of a paranormal phenomenon.	Unclaimed
2012–	Sri Lanka	Sri Lankan Rationalist Association	1,000,000 Sri Lankan rupees	$6341	Professor Carlo Fonseka renewed Abraham Kovoor's challenge.	Unclaimed
Unknown–	United States	Fayetteville Freethinkers	One goat	undetermined	"Offering a reward for a fulfilled Biblical prophecy!"	Unclaimed
1976–	India	Indian Skeptic, Indian CSICOP	100,000 Indian rupees	$1501	Formerly moderated by Basava Premanand, deceased in 2009. Offered after Abraham Kovoor fell ill with cancer in 1976. Premanand's magazine and organization have continued the challenge after his death in 2009.	Unclaimed
1995–	India	Indian Rationalist Association, Sanal Edamaruku	100,000 Indian rupees	$1501	To anyone who could prove the 1995 "Hindu milk miracle" was, in fact, a miracle. Since 2002, it includes "anyone who can provide scientific evidence for iridology".	Unclaimed
2011–	Mexico	Daniel Zepeda	20,000 Mexican pesos	$1074	"To anyone who can show, under proper observational and replicable conditions, evidence of a paranormal, supernatural or occult power for which science has no answer."	Unclaimed
1989–	United States	Tampa Bay Skeptics	1000 US dollars	$1,000	"[T]o anyone able to demonstrate any paranormal phenomenon under mutually agreed-upon observing conditions."	Unclaimed
2023	New Zealand	NZ Skeptics & NZ Association of Rationalists and Humanists	100,000 New Zealand dollars	$60,000	"[T]he challenge is open to anyone who can prove they possess a supernatural or paranormal ability. However, entry is limited to “prominent” people like those named by the society to kick things off."	Unclaimed

== List of defunct prizes ==
Date	Location	Challengers	Offered prize	Equivalent in dollars	Details	Status
1964–2015	United States	JREF, One Million Dollar Paranormal Challenge	1,000,000 US dollars	$1,000,000	Launched by James Randi as $1,000 in 1964, raised to $10,000 by 1980, to $100,000 by 1989, and finally to a million in 1996. Since the launch of the James Randi Educational Foundation, applications were processed and tests prepared and conducted by a committee. In 2015 the challenge was officially terminated.	Unclaimed. (Note: In 2003, the "Yellow Bamboo group" from Bali claimed they passed an (unofficial) JREF preliminary test. However, the JREF determined they had not passed this test, saying that regarding the video submitted to prove their claim, "...a Sony camera that takes a floppy disk, was used; it makes 12-second "snaps" of action, at very low resolution... that video "clip" is very obscure and dark, so it doesn't tell us much... we've now viewed the clip frame-by-frame, and... there is no evidence of anything supernatural available here.")
1987–2002	France	Gérard Majax, Henri Broch, Jacques Theodor, International Zetetic Challenge	200,000 Euro	$242,949	Mediums and clairvoyants were challenged to show their powers, but all 275 candidates allegedly failed.	Unclaimed
1928–1995	United States	Joseph Dunninger, Houdini Magical Hall of Fame	31,000 US dollars	$31,000	To anyone who can cause a suspended pencil in a sealed box to write a message on a pad of paper, also in the box.	Unclaimed
2012	India	Tarksheel Society	1,000,000 Indian rupees	$15,011	To anyone who could correctly predict the election results in five Indian state assemblies.	Unclaimed
2014	India	Federation of Indian Rationalist Associations	1,000,000 Indian rupees	$15,011	Correctly answer 21 out of 25 questions relating to future election results. Intended for astrologers, but open to anyone.	Unclaimed
1985–1988	United States	Paranormal Investigating Committee of Pittsburgh	10,000 US dollars	$10,000	"[T]o anyone who can demonstrate successfully a psychic claim in a controlled examination."	Unclaimed
2007–2009	United States	Sanad Rashed, Ahmed Khaled Tawfik	5000 US dollars	$5000	For proof ouija boards function as claimed.	Unclaimed
2008	India	Federation of Indian Rationalist Associations	200,000 Indian rupees	$3002	Correctly answer 21 out of 25 questions relating to future election results. Intended for astrologers, but open to anyone.	Unclaimed
1922	United States	Scientific American	2500 US dollars	$2500	Two $2,500 offers: (1) for the first authentic spirit photograph made under test conditions, or (2) for the first psychic to produce a "visible psychic manifestation."	Unclaimed
Unknown–2005	United States	New York Area Skeptics	2000 US dollars	$2000	Awarded to the successful completion of the JREF One Million Dollar Paranormal Challenge.	Unclaimed
1963–1978	India & Sri Lanka	Abraham Kovoor	100,000 Sri Lankan rupees	$634	Kovoor initiated the Abraham Kovoor's challenge starting in 1963. He inspired others like Randi and Premanand. He died in 1978.	Unclaimed
2012–2013	Estonia	Eesti Skeptik	500 Euro	$607	Awarded to anyone who passed the Estonian preliminary test to the Belgian Sisyphus Prize.	Unclaimed
2012–2013	Great Britain	Association for Skeptical Enquiry	400 British pounds	$551	Awarded to anyone who passed the British preliminary test to the Belgian Sisyphus Prize.	Unclaimed
1994–2022	New Zealand	Stuart Landsborough (member of the NZ Skeptics)	100,000 New Zealand dollars	$60,000	"[T]o anyone who could prove by psychic ability that they can indicate the exact location" of two halves of a promissory note hidden within an area of 100 metres inside Stuart Landsborough's Puzzling World. Over the years, the search area has been reduced from 5 kilometres to 100 metres and the prize doubled, but the note split in two to reduce the chance of winning by sheer luck. Contestants have to donate NZ$1,000 to charity if they fail.	Unclaimed
