= Abraham Kovoor's challenge =

Paranormal award

Abraham Kovoor declared, in 1963, an award of Rs. 100, 000/- (Sri Lankan Rupees) for anyone who could demonstrate supernatural or miraculous powers under fool-proof and fraud-proof conditions.

== The challenge ==
I, Abraham T. Kovoor of "Tiruvalla", Pamankada Lane, Colombo-6 do hereby state that l am prepared to pay an award of 100, 000 Sri Lankan rupees to any one from any part of the world who can demonstrate supernatural or miraculous powers under fool-proof and fraud-proof conditions. This offer will remain open till my death or till I find the first winner.

Godmen and saints who claim that they acquired miraculous powers through spiritual exercises and divine boons win this award if they can perform any of the following "miracles"

1. Read the serial number of a sealed up currency note.
2. Produce an exact replica of a currency note.
3. Stand stationary on burning cinders for half a minute without blistering the feet.
4. Materialise from nothing an object I ask.
5. Move or bend a solid object using psychokinetic power.
6. Read the thought of another person using telepathic powers.
7. Make an amputated limb grow even one inch by prayer, spiritual or faith healing powers, Lourdes water, blessing etc.
8. Levitate in the air by yogic power.
9. Stop the heart-beat for five minutes by spiritual power.
10. Stop breathing for thirty minutes by spiritual power.
11. Walk on water.
12. Leave the body in one place and reappear in another place.
13. Predict a future event.
14. Develop creative intelligence or get enlightened through transcendental or meditation.
15. Speak or understand an unknown language as a result of by being possessed by a spirit, holy or evil.
16. Produce a spirit or ghost to be photographed.
17. Disappear from the negative when photographed.
18. Get out of a locked room by spiritual power.
19. Increase the quantity by weight of a substance by divine power.
20. Detect a hidden object.
21. Convert water into petrol or wine.
22. Convert wine into blood.
23. Astrologers and palmists, who hoodwink the gullible by saying that astrology and palmistry are perfectly "Scientific", can win my award if they can pick out correctly—within a margin of five percent error—those of males, females, and living and the dead from a set of ten palm prints or astrological charts giving the exact time of birth correct to the minute, and places of birth with their latitudes and longitudes.

== The challenge today ==
Dr. Kovoor died in 1978. Until his death none could claim the award amount. Some fraudsters who sought publicity by taking on his challenge had to forfeit the initial deposit. After the death of Dr. Kovoor, Basava Premanand continued his challenge by offering Rs.100,000 (One Hundred Thousand Indian Rupees) to any person who will demonstrate any psychic, supernatural or paranormal ability of any kind under satisfactory observing conditions. Upon Premanand's death, the challenge is continued by the Indian Rationalist Association.

A similar challenge from James Randi of James Randi Educational Foundation also is in force offering a one-million-dollar prize to anyone who can show, under proper observing conditions, evidence of any paranormal, supernatural, or occult power or event.

== Bibliography ==
1. Begone Godmen – Jaico Publishing House, Mumbai, India.
2. Gods, Demons and Spirits – Jaico Publishing House, Mumbai, India.
3. Selected Works of A T Kovoor – Indian Atheist Publishers, New Delhi, India.
4. Exposing Paranormal Claims – Indian CSICOP, Podannur, Tamil Nadu, India
