= Dale Beyerstein =

Canadian philosopher

Dale Beyerstein is a philosopher who has taught at Malaspina College, Douglas College, Kwantlen College, the University of British Columbia, and Langara College. Dale is a co-founder of the BC Skeptics, and director-at-large of the foundation.

== Selected publications ==
- The Write Stuff (ed with B.L. Beyerstein), Buffalo, NY, Prometheus Press, 1992
- "The Functions and Limitations of Professional Codes of Ethics", in Winkler, E and Coombs, J: Applied Ethics, Oxford, Basil Blackwell, 1993
- "Psychiatric Ethics and Ethical Psychiatry" (with J. Paredes, B. Ledwidge and C. Kogan), Canadian Journal of Psychiatry, Vol 35, October 1990.
- "Sai Baba's miracles: an overview" published by B. Premanand, Podanur, India, 1994

== See also ==
- Barry Beyerstein, his brother
