= Wonder en is gheen Wonder =

Belgian popular science magazine

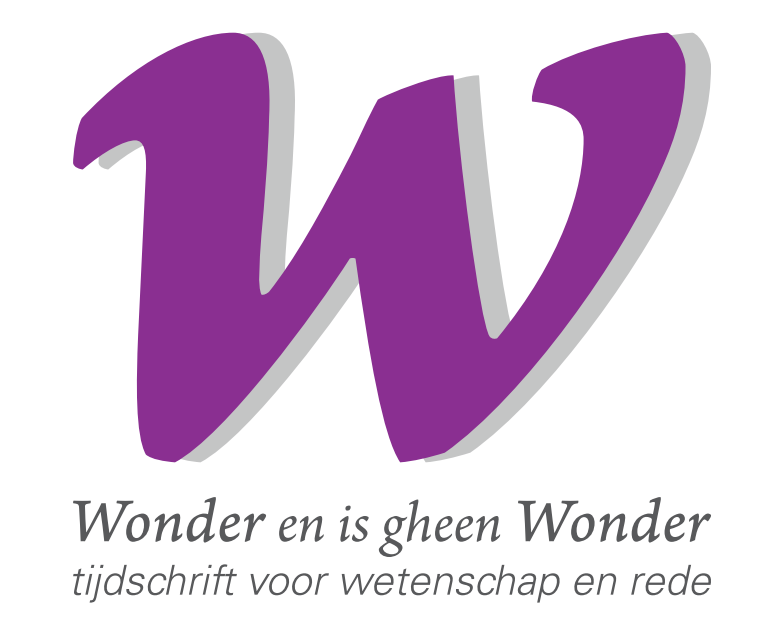
- Editor-in-chief: Bart Coenen
- Categories: Scientific skepticism
- Frequency: Quarterly
- Publisher: SKEPP
- First issue: 2000
- Country: Belgium (Flanders)
- Based in: Brussels
- Language: Dutch
- Website: skepp.be/nl/tijdschrift
- ISSN: 1377-5359

Wonder en is gheen Wonder (Mystery is no Mystery) is a popular science magazine of the Flemish skeptical association SKEPP. The paper was founded in 2000 by Tom Schoepen, who also served as its editor for its first ten years. The magazine is published four times a year and addresses pseudoscientific as well as science philosophical topics. The title is a reference to the 16th century Flemish mathematician and engineer Simon Stevin's commentary to his famous thought experiment: even if something looks strange, it can still have a naturalistic explanation. The subtitle Tijdschrift voor wetenschap en rede ("Magazine for science and reason") was taken from Skeptical Inquirer, the most world-renowned skeptical magazine that is published by the Committee for Skeptical Inquiry.

As of 2016, the editorial staff is composed as follows:

Core staff

- Bart Coenen (editor-in-chief)
- Cliff Beeckman
- Johan Braeckman
- Tim Trachet
- Luc Vancampenhout
- Pieter Van Nuffel
- Wietse Wiels

Editorial committee

- Wim Betz
- Stefaan Blancke
- Luc Bonneux
- Maarten Boudry
- Maxime Darge
- Geerdt Magiels
- Ronny Martens
- Marc Meuleman
- Pieter Peyskens
- Griet Vandermassen
- Frank Verhoft
