= Joseph Edamaruku =

Indian activist (1934–2006)

- Born: 7 September 1934; Idukki district, Kerala, British India
- Died: 29 June 2006 (aged 71); Mayur Vihar, New Delhi, India
- Occupations: Journalist, author, rationalist activist
- Organisation: Indian Rationalist Association
- Notable work: Kodumkattuyarthiya Kaalam
- Spouse: Soley Edamaruku
- Children: Sanal Edamaruku
- Awards: Kerala Sahitya Akademi Award for Biography and Autobiography

Joseph Edamaruku (7 September 1934 – 29 June 2006), often known simply as Edamaruku, was an Indian journalist, author and rationalist activist from Kerala. He was associated with the Malayalam magazine Kerala Sabdam for more than two decades and later served as its Delhi bureau chief. He was also a founder-editor of the Malayalam rationalist periodical Therali and served as president of the Indian Rationalist Association from 1995 to 2005.

Edamaruku wrote extensively in Malayalam on religion, philosophy, social criticism and claims of miracles. His works included critical studies of religious texts and traditions, and his autobiography Kodumkattuyarthiya Kaalam won the Kerala Sahitya Akademi Award for Biography and Autobiography in 1999.

== Early life and background ==
Edamaruku was born on 7 September 1934 in what is now Idukki district, Kerala. According to a later interview with his son Sanal Edamaruku, Joseph came from a Syrian Christian family, while his wife Soley came from a Hindu family; both later became associated with the rationalist movement in Kerala.

== Journalism ==
Edamaruku worked as a Malayalam journalist and was associated with the Kerala Sabdam group of publications after moving to Delhi in 1977. He later became the publication's Delhi bureau chief. He was also involved in rationalist publishing, including as a founder-editor of Therali, a Malayalam rationalist weekly or periodical.

== Rationalist activism ==
Edamaruku was a prominent figure in the rationalist movement in Kerala and in the wider Indian rationalist movement. DNA India described him as "the face of rationalist movement in Kerala" and noted his campaigns against superstition, obscurantism and blind belief. He served as president of the Indian Rationalist Association from 1995 to 2005.

In the early 1970s, Edamaruku was involved in organising public "miracle exposure" tours by the Sri Lankan rationalist Abraham Kovoor. A 2007 article in New Humanist described those tours as part of the development of modern Indian rationalist activism, noting that they were organised by the Indian Rationalist Association and Joseph Edamaruku.

Edamaruku was also publicly critical of astrology and of the introduction of astrology courses into Indian universities. In 2004, while president of the Indian Rationalists, he was quoted by UCANews criticising a court decision that allowed astrology courses in universities.

== Writing ==
Edamaruku wrote in Malayalam and English on religion, philosophy, rationalism, magic and claims of miracles. His obituary in DNA India stated that he authored 168 books and more than 2,000 essays. His major works included Christ and Krishna Never Lived, Quran: A Critical Study, and Bhagavad Gita: A Critical Study. He also translated and published works by Abraham Kovoor in Malayalam.

His autobiography, Kodumkattuyarthiya Kaalam (The Times that Raised the Tempest), received the Kerala Sahitya Akademi Award for Biography and Autobiography in 1999.

== Death ==
Edamaruku died on 29 June 2006 at his residence in Mayur Vihar, New Delhi. In accordance with his wishes, his body was donated to the All India Institute of Medical Sciences for medical research.

== Personal life ==
Edamaruku was married to Soley Edamaruku. Their son, Sanal Edamaruku, became a rationalist writer and activist and later president of the Indian Rationalist Association and Rationalist International.

== Selected works ==
- Christ and Krishna Never Lived
- Quran: A Critical Study
- Bhagavad Gita: A Critical Study
- Upanishathukal: Oru Vimarsana Padanam
- Yukthivada Rashtram
- Kodumkattuyarthiya Kaalam
- Kovoorinte Sampoorna Krithikal

== Awards ==
- Kerala Sahitya Akademi Award for Biography and Autobiography, 1999, for Kodumkattuyarthiya Kaalam.
- International Atheist Award, 1979.

== See also ==
- Indian Rationalist Association
- Kerala Yukthivadi Sangham
- Abraham Kovoor
- Sanal Edamaruku
