= K. T. Behanan =

Indian social psychologist

Kovoor Thomas Behanan
- Born: Travancore, British India
- Education: Calcutta University
- Alma mater: Yale Divinity School
- Father: Iype Thoma Kathanar

Kovoor Thomas Behanan (1902–1963) was an Indian social psychologist, a pioneer in the scientific study of the science of yoga. His book on this subject, published in 1937, is still widely cited. He served as a researcher at Yale's Institute for Human Relations (1934–40), and as a senior bureaucrat with the Indian Civil Service in New Delhi and Simla (1941–46) and the UN Secretariat in New York (1947-1952).

== Biography ==
K. T. Behanan was born in the princely state of Travancore, British India, a member the aristocratic Kovoor family of Syrian Christians. His father was Iype Thoma Kathanar, the Vicar General of the Mar Thoma Church, and a leader in local state politics; an older brother was Abraham, a botanist and an activist for the rationalist movement.

Behanan graduated from Calcutta University in 1923 with honours in history and political science. He served with the Madras Province government for two years. He spent a year studying philosophy at the University of Toronto, and then moved to the Yale Divinity School from which he graduated magna cum laude in 1929. That same year he joined Yale's Department of Psychology as a PhD student under the supervision of Walter R. Miles.

In 1931 Yale awarded him a Sterling Fellowship to conduct a scientific study of yoga in India under Swami Kuvalayananda. He received his doctorate in 1934 and subsequently joined the multi-disciplinary Institute for Human Relations (IHR) as a researcher working on a range of subjects. In 1937 he published a highly influential book, Yoga: A Scientific Evaluation, based in part on his thesis research which remained in print for decades to follow, and was featured favourably at the time in TIME, LIFE and the New York Review of Books.

After returning to India in 1940, he married Dr. Mary Thangam Cherian (1910-1998), a paediatrician, also from the Syrian Christian community who had trained in London and was working in the Madras Province's Medical Service. The couple had a son in January 1942, Roy Thomas Behanan.

Dr. K. T. Behanan joined the Indian Civil Service and worked in New Delhi and Simla in a series of increasingly senior positions within the National War Front's central office until victory over Japan in August 1945.

In 1946 while employed by the Government of India's Directorate of Disposal, he was offered and accepted a post in New York working on educational policy at the UN's Trusteeship Council. Since his wife was a practicing physician who would be unable to continue to practice medicine in the U.S., which did not recognise Commonwealth medical licenses, accepting this appointment meant considerable personal financial and professional sacrifice for the family. Other challenges following their arrival in May 1947 included New York's highly racially segregated school system. As a result, the Behanans with a young child banded together with other UN families to establish the renowned United Nations International School at Lake Success; Dr. K. T. Behanan served as chairman of its board.

Following Indian independence in August 1947 Dr. K. T. Behanan found that his career, like the careers of other permanent staff from decolonised states did not fare well in internal "office politics" of the UN Secretariat. This defeated his idealistic hopes, leading him to tender his resignation in 1952. His critique and suggestions for reform of the UN Secretariat were published in book form that year. Although it attracted discussion at the time it was not seriously implemented.

In April 1952 the couple's 10-year-old son Roy tragically died on the operating table while undergoing minor surgery at Kew Gardens Hospital shortly before the family intended to return to India. The family and others attributed the death to criminal medical negligence, prompting an investigation by the Queen's District Attorney's Office, which a year later resulted in 2nd degree manslaughter charges against the surgeon and anaesthetist in late April 1953. Unfortunately the family failed to receive justice, as detailed in a book by Dr. Mrs. Behanan, American Justice for Asians.

The couple subsequently relocated to Bangalore, India, where Dr. Mrs. Behanan established a successful private paediatric practice in Palace Orchards. The couple had no further children. In 1963 his personal library of some 4000 books and periodicals, now known as the Behanan Library, was donated to The Indian Institute of World Culture in Bangalore following his death.
