= Iype Thoma Kathanar =

- Born: 2 December 1842; Thiruvalla, Kingdom of Travancore
- Died: 27 January 1917 (aged 74); Thiruvalla, Kingdom of Travancore
- Title: Kathanar
- Spouse: Elizhuba
- Children: Abraham Kovoor (son); K. T. Behanan (son)
- Parent(s): K. T. Iype; Mariamma
- Theological work
- Era: Reformation of Malankara Church (19th century)
- Tradition or movement: Malankara Mar Thoma Syrian Church (1898)

Rev. Kovoor Iype Thoma Kathanar (02 December 1842–1917), popularly known as Rev. Kovoor (Kovoor Achen), was a renowned and pioneering clergyman of the Mar Thoma Syrian Church.

Together with Mathews Mar Athanasius, he led the reformation activities in the Malankara Church after the death of Abraham Malpan, including the establishment of prayer meetings, vernacular worship and Holy Communion in Malayalam as well as the publication of translated and revised Syriac Liturgy in Malayalam, all of which led to the eventual formation of the Mar Thoma Church.

Rev. Kovoor also played an important role during the first three decades of the church's independent existence as its first vicar general, after it separated from the Malankara Jacobite Syrian Church following the Travancore Royal Court verdict in 1889.

== Biography ==
=== Early life and education ===
Iype Thoma Kathanar was born on 2 December 1842, as K. I. Thomas into the aristocratic Kovoor family of Saint Thomas Christians at Thiruvalla, Travancore state. His father K. T. Iype was a timber merchant and his mother Mariamma was the daughter of P. I. Punnoose, son of Ittycheria of the Pulimoottil family in Thiruvalla.

He had one sister (Mariamma) and four brothers (Behannan, Punnoose, Eliyas, and Cherian). As a child, he was known as Thommy.

As was customary at the time, he received his primary education at the local Kudippallikoodam under the instruction of Thiruvalla Palliyil Ashan. He subsequently studied basic English, mathematics, and Bible studies at the Church Missionary School in Thukalassery, Thiruvalla. Owing to his academic performance, the school recommended that he pursue higher education in England; however, the proposal was declined by his parents.

He later studied the Syriac language, liturgy, and ecclesiastical chants under his relative, the Syriac scholar Kovoor Gheevarghese Kathanar. By the age of sixteen, he had attained considerable proficiency in Syriac liturgy and regularly sang and chanted liturgical prayers and hymns in Syriac at Niranam Church. During one of his visits to the church, his performance reportedly impressed Mathews Mar Athanasius.

=== Ordination ===
In 1858, K. I. Thomas was ordained as a deacon by Mathews Mar Athanasius at the Old Seminary in Kottayam. The following year, he married Elizhuba, a member of the prominent Maret family of Kallooppara. In 1861, he was ordained as a priest by Euyakim Mar Coorilos, the Patriarchal delegate sent from Antioch, at his home parish, St. George Church. Following his priestly ordination, he commenced his pastoral ministry and came to be widely known as Rev. Kovoor (Kovoor Achen).

=== Reformation in Malankara Church ===
Influenced by the ministry and reformist teachings of early church reformers such as Abraham Malpan and Kaithayil Geevarghese Malpan, Rev. Kovoor introduced several significant reforms at Paliyakara Church. Among these was the use of Malayalam in the celebration of Holy Communion, in place of the exclusive use of Syriac, which was not understood by most members of the congregation. These reforms met with considerable opposition from the parishioners, including members of his own family, and were supported only by a small group of like-minded individuals. In 1869, opponents of the reforms submitted a complaint against him to the Metropolitan.

The Metropolitan did not initiate disciplinary proceedings against Rev. Kovoor. Instead, he proposed a compromise whereby a wall would be erected on the eastern side of the church, allowing Achen to conduct the Holy Qurbana separately. Rev. Kovoor, however, continued to officiate at the main altar and persisted with his reform initiatives. This intensified the dispute, leading to widespread protests, physical confrontations, and allegations lodged against him before government authorities. The controversy ultimately resulted in a schism within the congregation, with the opposing faction establishing a new church at Kavumbhagam on land donated by the Kattapuram family. This church became known as Kattapuram St. George Church. Subsequently, another church, St. Mulk Church, was also established nearby at Kavumbhagam.

Despite sustained opposition, Rev. Kovoor continued his reform efforts within the church. As part of these initiatives, he introduced prayer groups and prayer meetings conducted in Malayalam. These gatherings encouraged greater participation by lay members, who were permitted to lead prayers and organize devotional meetings, with the aim of fostering the spiritual growth and religious education of the congregation on a regular basis.

Rev. Kovoor also supervised the construction of a wooden bridge in front of Paliyakara Church. During his tenure, a formal accounting and bookkeeping system was introduced to ensure the systematic management of church finances.

His liturgical reforms culminated in the first formal Malayalam translation of the Thaksa, the West Syriac Jacobite recension of the Liturgy of St. James. The translation incorporated revisions, omissions, and modifications in accordance with the reform principles established in Malankara by Abraham Malpan several decades earlier. In 1872, with the approval of Mathews Mar Athanasius, the revised liturgy was published in Malayalam and printed at the CMS Press in Kottayam. The translated and revised liturgical text was subsequently adopted in eight churches, including Maramon Church.

The reform movement in which Rev. Kovoor played a prominent role ultimately contributed to the developments that culminated in the 1889 verdict of the Royal Travancore Court and the subsequent emergence of the Mar Thoma Syrian Church as an independent ecclesiastical body. Following the court's decision, the reformist faction retained control of only three of the historic churches, while the remainder remained under the authority of the opposing faction.

=== Leadership in the Mar Thoma Church ===
In 1892, Rev. Kovoor was appointed Vicar General of the Mar Thoma Syrian Church. In the same year, he played a key role in the acquisition of Panchayathu Purayidam, the site of the present-day S.C.S. campus at S.C.S. Mount, Thiruvalla, with the objective of establishing a permanent central campus for the Church. The property was purchased from the Thittapallil family, a prosperous Ezhava family of Thiruvalla, for a sum of ₹600.

The funds for the purchase were raised through a contribution from Puthencavu Mathilakam Arohanam Mar Thoma Church. The endowment was drawn from a larger amount that the congregation had received as compensation upon relinquishing its claims to its pre-reformation parent parish, St. Mary's Cathedral, following its separation from that church.

Rev. Kovoor is also credited with introducing the practice of Kettuthengu, a system under which coconut trees from individual households were dedicated to the church to generate revenue for its activities. Coconuts and coconut-derived products, constituted a major source of income for many families in the region during that period.

In addition, he played an important role in the formation and advancement of the church's clergy, overseeing the ordination and mentoring of several priests and bishops who would later provide leadership to the church during the late nineteenth and early twentieth centuries. Among them was M. N. Abraham of the Maret family, whom Rev. Kovoor encouraged and supported in pursuing higher studies in the United States. In 1912, Abraham was sent to the United States as a deacon for doctoral studies, which he completed in 1915. He was subsequently ordained as a priest and was consecrated as Bishop Abraham Mar Thoma on 28 December 1917. Rev. Kovoor, however, did not live to witness the consecration, having died in January 1917.

When Thoma Kathanar became the vicar general, his brother Punnoose's son K. P. Thomas was consecrated as a priest by Titus I Metropolitan in 1895 at Paliekkara Church.

Rev. K. P. Thomas taught at Kottayam Mar Thoma Seminary and also acted as assistant vicar to Thoma Kathanar and served at various parishes such as Thiruvalla, Mepral, Chatthenkery and Karackal.

=== Secular life ===
Ipe Thoma Kathanar was well known as an orator and debater. One of his famous debates at Niranam was documented.

As a representative of the people of Thiruvalla taluk, he was elected to the Travancore Sri Mulam Praja Sabha, the first popularly elected legislature in modern India, during the years 1904, 1905, 1911, 1914 and 1915.

== Death ==
On 16 January 1917, Rev. Kovoor became sick and he died peacefully on 27 January 1917.

Achen's body was buried in the SCS compound behind the SCS Church.

== Legacy ==
In his memory, the church constructed the VGM Hall (Vicar General Iype Thoma Kathanar Memorial Hall) in the SCS compound in Tiruvalla, that still stands today as an important go-to place in Thiruvalla town for conducting large meetings, conferences and major events.

His older son Abraham (1898 – 1978) was a professor and rationalist who became famous through his campaign to expose various Indian and Sri Lankan "god-men" and so-called paranormal phenomena as frauds.

Abraham's son, Aries Kovoor (1927–2006), was also a professor and renowned biological scientist of Sri Lanka.

His younger son, Behanan was a renowned sociologist and psychologist, who earned Ph.D. in psychology from Yale in 1934 and had performed pioneering scientific appraisal on Yoga that was published as a book and made popular to the western world through visual coverage in the LIFE magazine in 1937. Behanan had also served the United Nations between 1946 and 1952.

Behanan's son Roy T. Behanan tragically died on the operating table while undergoing minor surgery at Kew Gardens Hospital, in 1952 at the age of 10.
