= Andreas De Leenheer =

Belgian academic and biologist (1941–2022)

- Born: 16 May 1941; Zele, German-occupied Belgium
- Died: 20 November 2022 (aged 81); Ghent, Belgium
- Occupations: Professor; Biologist

Andreas De Leenheer (16 May 1941 – 20 November 2022) was a Belgian academic and biologist. He was Vice-Rector of Ghent University from 1997 to 2001 and Rector from 2001 to 2005.

== Biography ==
In 1971, De Leenheer became a lecturer at the Faculty of Pharmaceutical Sciences at Ghent University. In 1977, he became a full professor and headed the laboratories department at the Faculty of Pharmaceutical Sciences from 1984 to 1993. He was dean of the Faculty from 1984 to 1992. From 1992 to 1998, he was chair of the Department of Bioanalysis. From 1997 to 2001, he was Vice-Rector before serving as Rector from 2001 to 2005. During his tenure, he led the movement for the renovation of the Boekentoren, convincing the university board to provide funds for the project in 2005.

In honor of his daughter, Marianne, who died in a traffic collision in 1991, De Leenheer created the Marianne De Leenheerprijs in 2008, a prize of 2500 euros per year for mathematics students at Ghent University.

De Leenheer served as chairman of the Film Fest Ghent until 2014, when he was succeeded by Claire Tillekaerts. He also served as director of the Gent Festival van Vlaanderen and chairman of the Federal Public Planning Service Science Policy. In 2008, King Albert II of Belgium made him a Baron.

De Leenheer died in Ghent on 20 November 2022, at the age of 81.

== Awards ==
- Zesde Vijs (2004)
