= Tim Trachet =

Belgian journalist (born 1958)

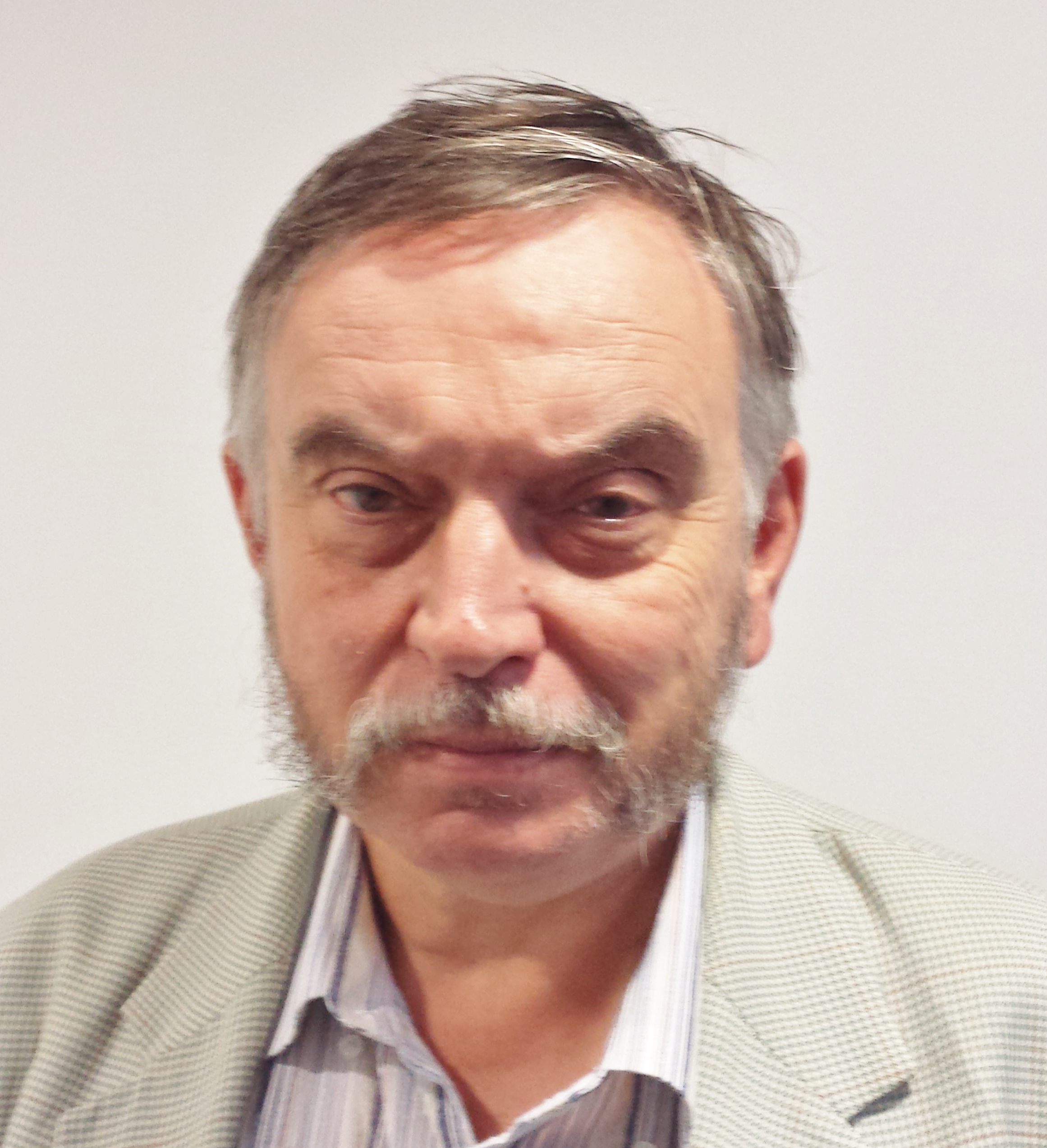
- Tim Trachet at the European Skeptics Congress 2015.
- Born: 1958 (age 67–68); Belgium
- Education: Vrije Universiteit Brussel
- Occupations: Writer, journalist, skeptical activist
- Known for: Writing about history, skepticism and pseudoscience
- Scientific career
- Fields: Astronomy, mathematics, philosophy

Tim Trachet (born 1958) is a Belgian writer, publicist, journalist and skeptic. He studied mathematics, astronomy and philosophy at the Vrije Universiteit Brussel and is a reporter at the VRT, where he produces history television documentaries.

Since its foundation in 1976, he was active in the working group Prometheus of the Vereniging voor Sterrenkunde (Society for Astronomy), that focused on the critical investigation of pseudoscience. This working group resulted in the foundation of SKEPP, of which he became the first chairman from 1990 to 1998. At present he is honorary chairman and general secretary of SKEPP. In 1990s and sometimes thereafter, Trachet frequently wrote for Skepter, the magazine of the Dutch skeptical organisation Stichting Skepsis. In 2000, its Flemish counterpart Wonder en is gheen wonder was founded, where he has since been member of the editorial staff and regularly publishes articles. Since 1988, he is also editorial board member of the popular science magazine Zenit for astronomy, meteorology and space research.

Since 2013, Trachet is vice-chairman (previously as treasurer) in the board of directors of the European Council of Skeptical Organisations (ECSO), of which he was one of the founders in 1994.

In the frame of the 100th anniversary of the First World War in 2014, Trachet wrote about a series of myths that still surround 'The Great War'.

== Books ==
- Astrologie: zin of onzin? (with Ronny Martens), Houtekiet, 1995
  - English translation: Making Sense of Astrology, Prometheus Books, 1998
- Het drama van Abbeville, Houtekiet, 2010
- Alles over de monarchie, Houtekiet, 2011
- De ster van Bethlehem, ASP, 2016
- Waar is Hitler?, ASP, 2020
