= One Million Dollar Paranormal Challenge =

Offer to pay anyone who could demonstrate a paranormal ability

The One Million Dollar Paranormal Challenge was an offer by the James Randi Educational Foundation (JREF) to pay out one million U.S. dollars to anyone who could demonstrate a supernatural or paranormal ability under agreed-upon scientific testing criteria. A version of the challenge was first issued in 1964. Over a thousand people applied to take it, but none were successful. The challenge was terminated in 2015.

== History ==
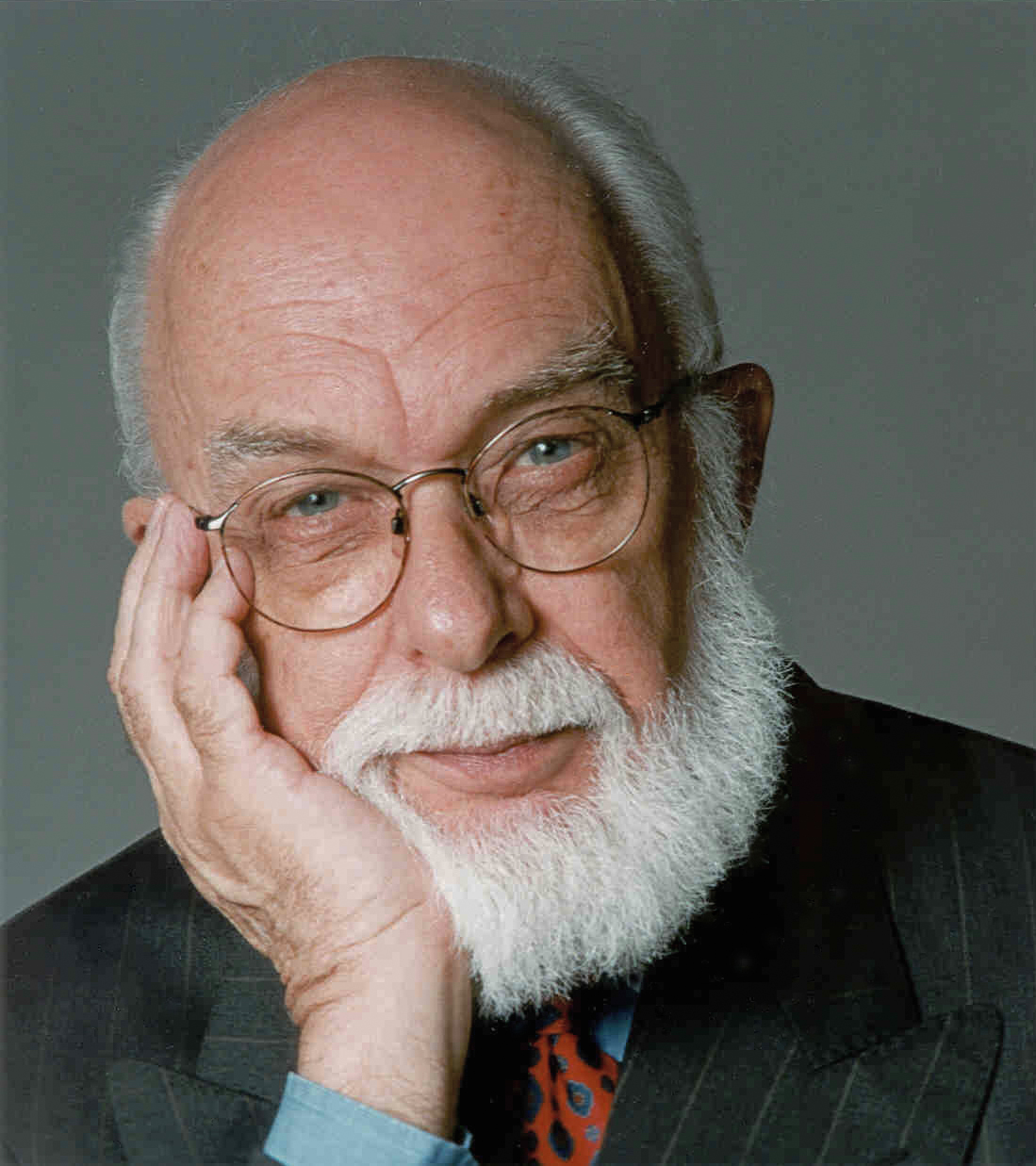
James Randi, founder of the James Randi Educational Foundation

James Randi developed the idea for the challenge during a radio panel discussion when a parapsychologist challenged him to "put [his] money where [his] mouth is." In 1964, Randi offered a $1,000 prize, soon increasing it to $10,000. Later, Lexington Broadcasting wanted Randi to do a show called the $100,000 Psychic Prize, so they added $90,000 to the original $10,000 raised by Randi. Finally, in 1996, one of his friends, Internet pioneer Rick Adams, donated $1 million for the prize. The prize is sometimes referred to in the media as the "Randi Prize".

By April 1, 2007, only those with an already existing media profile and the backing of a reputable academic were allowed to apply for the challenge. It was hoped that the resources freed up by not having to test obscure and possibly mentally ill claimants would then be used to challenge high-profile alleged psychics and mediums such as Sylvia Browne and John Edward with a campaign in the media.

On January 4, 2008, it was announced that the prize would be discontinued on March 6, 2010, in order to free the money for other uses. In the meantime, claimants were welcome to vie for it. One of the reasons offered for its discontinuation is the unwillingness of higher-profile claimants to apply. However, at The Amazing Meeting 7 it was announced that the $1 Million Challenge prize would not expire in 2010. The Foundation issued a formal update on its website on July 30, 2009, announcing the Challenge's continuation, and stated more information would be provided at a later date on any possible changes to the requirements and procedures.

As an April Fool's prank on April 1, 2008, at the MIT Media Lab, Randi pretended to award the prize to magician Seth Raphael after participating in a test of Raphael's "psychic abilities".

On March 8, 2011, the JREF announced that qualifications were being altered to open the challenge to more applicants. Whereas applicants were previously required to submit press clippings and a letter from an academic institution to qualify, the new rules now require applicants to present either press clippings, a letter from an academic institution, or a public video demonstrating their ability. The JREF explained that these new rules would give people without media or academic documentation a way to be considered for testing, and would allow the JREF to use online video and social media to reach a wider audience.

Since the challenge was first created by Randi in 1964, about a thousand people applied, but none were successful. Randi has said that few unsuccessful applicants ever seriously considered that their failure to perform might be due to the nonexistence of the power they believe they possess.

In January 2015, James Randi announced that he was officially retiring and stepping down from his position with the JREF. In September 2015, JREF announced that their board had decided that it would convert the foundation into a grant-making foundation, and they will no longer accept applications directly from people claiming to have a paranormal power. In 2015, the James Randi paranormal challenge was officially terminated.

== Rules and judging ==
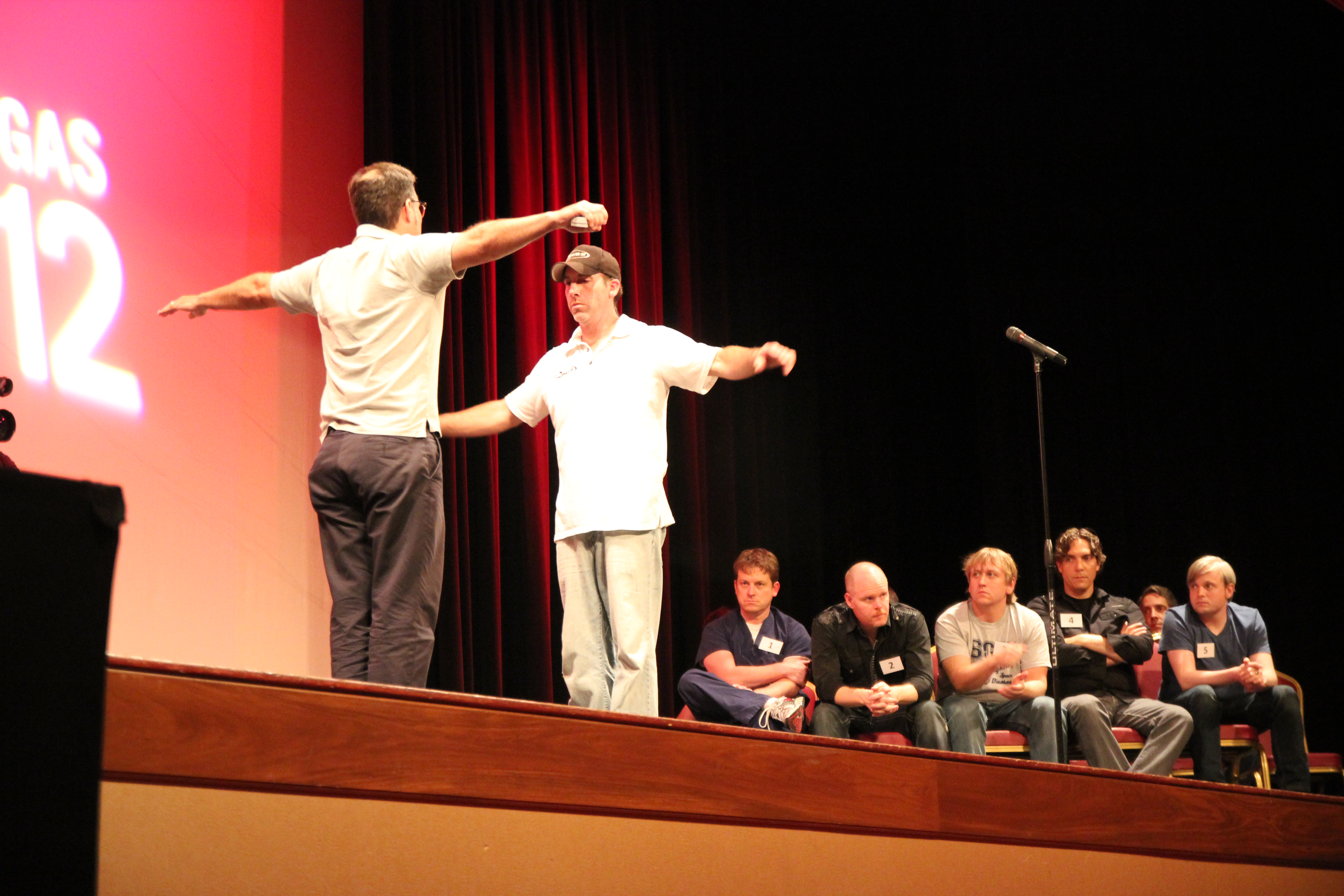
A TAM 2012 applicant claimed that a wristband product could improve a person's balance. Here, James Underdown (back to camera) has his balance performance tested during the preliminary test phase of the challenge.

The official challenge rules stipulated that the participant must agree, in writing, to the conditions and criteria of their test. Claims that cannot be tested experimentally are not eligible for the Challenge. Claimants were able to influence all aspects of the testing procedure and participants during the initial negotiation phase of the challenge. Applications for any challenges that might cause serious injury or death were not accepted.

To ensure that the experimental conditions themselves did not negatively affect a claimant's ability to perform, non-blinded preliminary control tests are often performed. For example, the JREF had dowsers perform a control test, in which the dowser attempts to locate the target substance or object using their dowsing ability, even though the target's location has been revealed to the applicant. Failure to display a 100% success rate in the open test would cause their immediate disqualification. However, claimants were usually able to perform successfully during the open test, confirming that experimental conditions are adequate.

Claimants agreed to readily observable, unambiguous success criteria prior to the test. Randi had said that he need not participate in any way with the actual execution of the test, and he has been willing to travel far from the test location to avoid the perception that his anti-paranormal bias could influence the test results.

The discussions between the JREF and applicants were at one time posted on a public discussion board. After the resignation of Randi's assistant Mark Kramer and subsequent changes to challenge rules—requiring applicants to have demonstrated considerable notability—new applications were no longer logged.

James Randi discusses the Million Dollar Challenge 2008

== Example of a test (dowsing) ==
In 1979, Randi tested four people in Italy for dowsing ability. The prize at the time was $10,000. The conditions were that a 10-by-10-meter (33 by 33 ft) test area would be used. There would be a water supply and a reservoir just outside the test area. There would be three plastic pipes running underground from the source to the reservoir along different concealed paths. Each pipe would pass through the test area by entering at some point on an edge and exiting at some point on an edge. A pipe would not cross itself but it might cross others. The pipes were 3 centimeters (1.2 inches) in diameter and were buried 50 cm (20 in) below ground. Valves would select which of the pipes water was running through, and only one would be selected at a time. At least 5 liters per second (0.18 cubic feet per second) of water would flow through the selected pipe. The dowser must first check the area to see if there is any natural water or anything else that would interfere with the test, and that would be marked. Additionally, the dowser must demonstrate that the dowsing reaction works on an exposed pipe with the water running. Then one of the three pipes would be selected randomly for each trial. The dowser would place ten to one hundred pegs in the ground along the path they traces as the path of the active pipe. Two-thirds of the pegs placed by the dowser must be within 10 cm (3.9 in) of the center of the pipe being traced for the trial to be a success. Three trials would be done for the test of each dowser and the dowser must pass two of the three trials to pass the test. A lawyer was present, in possession of Randi's $10,000 check. If a claimant were successful, the lawyer would give him the check. If none were successful, the check would be returned to Randi.

All of the dowsers agreed with the conditions of the test and stated that they felt able to perform the test that day and that the water flow was sufficient. Before the test they were asked how sure they were that they would succeed. All said either "99 percent" or "100 percent" certain. They were asked what they would conclude if the water flow was 90 degrees from what they thought it was and all said that it was impossible. After the test, they were asked how confident they were that they had passed the test. Three answered "100 percent" and one answered that he had not completed the test.

When all of the tests were over and the location of the pipes was revealed, none of the dowsers had passed the test. Dr. Borga had placed his markers carefully, but the nearest was a full 2.4 meters (8 ft) from the water pipe. Borga said, "We are lost", but within two minutes he started blaming his failure on many things such as sunspots and geomagnetic variables. Two of the dowsers thought they had found natural water before the test started, but disagreed with each other about where it was, as well as with the ones who found no natural water.

== Criticism ==
Astronomer Dennis Rawlins described the challenge as insincere, saying that Randi would ensure he never had to pay out. In the October 1981 issue of Fate, Rawlins quoted him as saying "I always have an out". Randi stated that Rawlins did not give the entire quotation, and actually said "Concerning the challenge, I always have an 'out': I'm right!"

Self-proclaimed psychic Rosemary Altea suggested the one million dollars prize fund did not exist, or was in the form of pledges or promissory notes. The JREF stated that the million dollars was in the form of negotiable bonds within a "James Randi Educational Foundation Prize Account" and that validation of the account and the prize amount could be supplied on demand. The money was held in an Evercore Wealth Management account.

== Challenges ==
=== Refusals to be tested ===
On Larry King Live, March 6, 2001, Larry King asked psychic Sylvia Browne if she would take the challenge and she agreed. Randi appeared with Browne again on Larry King Live on September 3, 2001, and she again accepted the challenge. However, she refused to be tested and Randi kept a clock on his website recording the number of weeks that had passed since Browne accepted the challenge without following through. Eventually the clock was replaced with text stating that "over 5 years" had passed. Browne died in 2013.

In an appearance on Larry King Live on January 26, 2007, Randi challenged psychic Rosemary Altea to take the one-million-dollar challenge. During Altea and Randi's June 5, 2001 meeting on the same show, Altea refused to take the challenge, calling it "a trick". Instead Altea, in part, replied "I agree with what he says, that there are many, many people who claim to be spiritual mediums, they claim to talk to the dead. There are many, people, we all know this. There are cheats and charlatans everywhere." Randi's response was to suggest that Altea was also one of the "cheats and charlatans".

In an appearance on ITV's This Morning, on September 27, 2011, magician Paul Zenon challenged Welsh psychic Leigh Catherine (aka Leigh-Catherine Salway) to take the one million dollar challenge and she accepted. Phillip Schofield, a This Morning host, stated that the program would pay for her flights to the US to be tested. Salway subsequently backed out of the challenge, claiming it was "dodgy" and "set up to make it impossible to pass".

=== Rejected applicants ===
Randi rejected an application from Rico Kolodzey, a breatharian who claimed to have survived without food since 1998. Although the policy stipulated that applications for any challenges that might cause serious injury or death were not accepted, in 2006, Randi agreed to test Kolodzey's claims, but the two parties were unable to agree on the venue and method of the test.

Members of a group from Bali, referring to themselves as Yellow Bamboo, claimed one of their number, Pak Nyoman Serengen, could knock down an attacker at a distance, using only a piece of yellow bamboo. Video clips on their website showed a crowd of students running at Serengen, and falling to the ground when (or, in some cases, slightly before) Serengen extended his hand and shouted. The JREF arranged volunteers to carry out a preliminary investigation, but after the Yellow Bamboo group "threw every sort of obstacle in the way of that plan", Randi announced that he was terminating further involvement with them. A local volunteer contacted Randi offering to investigate the group unofficially. A low-resolution video showed the investigator being knocked to the ground during a preliminary test. The JREF pointed out that the test was not conducted according to the proposed protocol, with multiple flaws in the execution including being carried out at night. Upon viewing a set of still shots from the incident, several people experienced with stun-guns suggested that an electroshock weapon could have been used.

=== Tests at The Amazing Meeting ===
In July 2009, Danish psychic/dowser Connie Sonne was given the chance to prove her dowsing ability. She was asked to dowse some randomly selected cards hidden in envelopes and lost the challenge by selecting other incorrect ones. In an interview with Mark Edward afterward, she insisted that she lost merely because, "…it wasn't time yet for my powers to be revealed."

In July 2014, Chinese salesman Fei Wang was tested in front of an audience of 600 at the conclusion of The Amazing Meeting in Las Vegas. Wang said that from his right hand, he could transmit a mysterious force a distance of 91 centimeters (3 feet), unhindered by wood, metal, plastic or cardboard. The energy, he said, could be felt by others as heat, pressure, magnetism, or simply "an indescribable change." A total of nine people were selected by Wang as subjects who would be able to determine whether they were receiving the force from his hand. On stage, Wang and a control person were behind a curtain, and the subjects were in front of the curtain with eyes and ears covered so as not to be able to deduce who was behind the curtain. A colored ball was chosen randomly to determine whether Wang or the control person would go first, and in that order they tried to transmit the energy onto the subject's hand (hidden from their view inside a cardboard box). The subject then stated whether she had felt any energy and whether it came from the first or second person. Wang needed to be the person selected by at least 8 of the 9 subjects in order to win the million dollars. After both of the first two subjects failed to choose Wang, the challenge was over. Wang stated that he would try again the next year, saying, "This energy is mysterious".

Tech journalist Lee Hutchinson approached the JREF after writing an article for Ars Technica about directional Ethernet cables that claim to "keep your audio signal completely free of electromagnetic interference". At the 2015 Amazing Meeting, the MDC set up a controlled double-blind demonstration with volunteers listening to two identical recordings with a randomly selected Ethernet cable, a normal one or the cable claiming to improve the listening experience. After seven volunteers (1 hit, 1 miss and 5 hearing no difference), the demonstration was ended as they were unable to select the "enhanced" cable over the common cable enough times to satisfy the testing protocols.

Year	Challenger	Purported Ability	Test	Results	Notes
2007	Derek Ogilvie	Mediumship	Identify which one out of ten toys is being used by a child at a particular time.	Failed	
2009	Connie Sonne	Dowsing (Pendulum)	Identify playing cards in sealed envelope.	Failed	
2010	Anita Ikonen	Medical dowsing	Determine by observation which of five subjects was missing a kidney.	Failed	Billed as "demonstration" not "test"
2011	No challenger available				
2012	Andrew Needles	Performance-enhancing bracelet	Distinguish participants wearing real product significant number of times.	Failed	
2013	Brahim Addoun	Remote viewing	Remotely identify 3 of 20 objects.	Failed	
2014	Fei Wang	Sending energy through his hand that can be felt by another person.	The energy should be felt by the target person correctly eight out of nine times.	Failed	
2015	No claimant – "Demonstration test"	Ethernet cables that are claimed to be "directional".	Volunteers were played sound twice and were asked to determine which cable had the highest sound quality.	Failed	

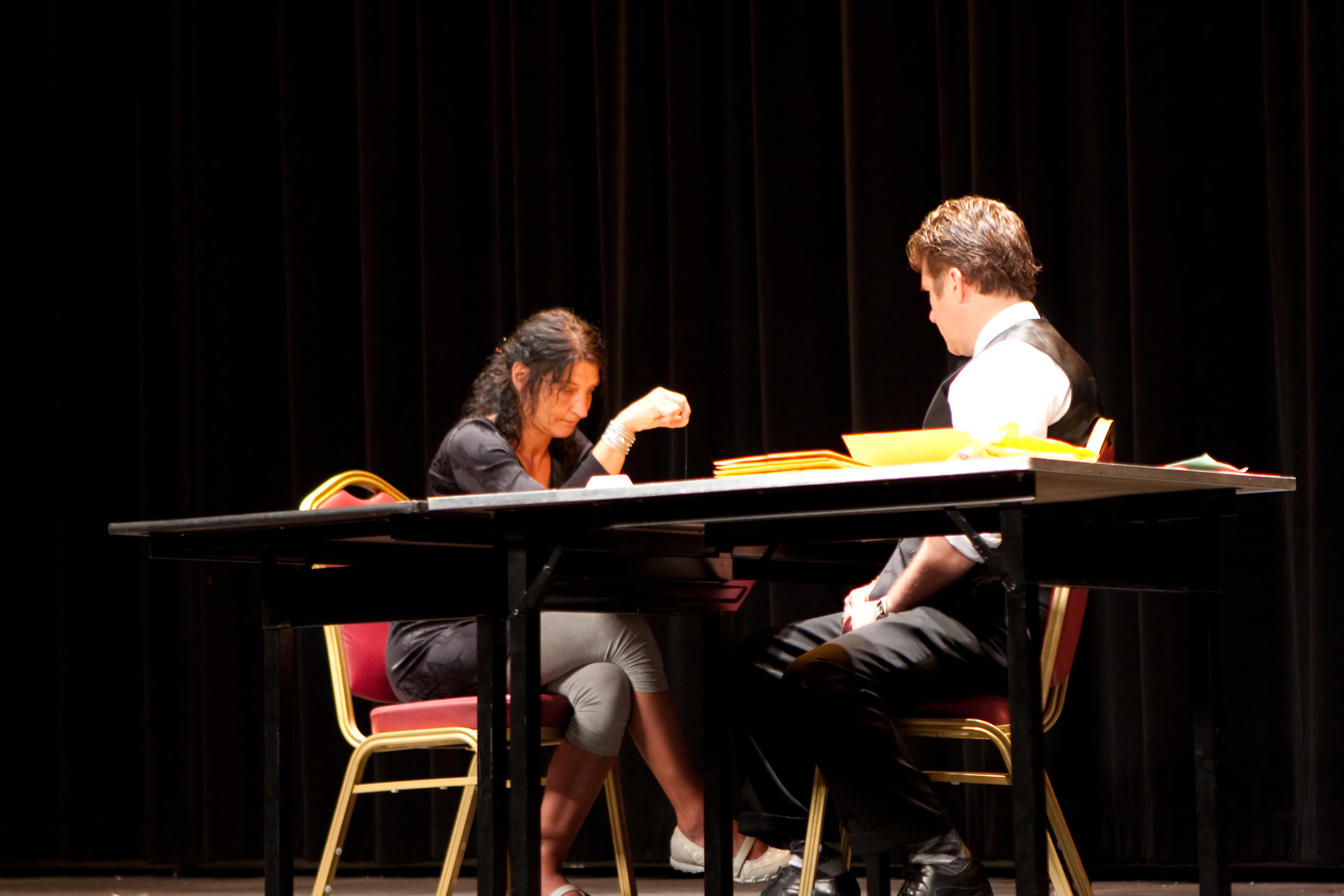
Connie Sonne and Banachek at TAM 2009

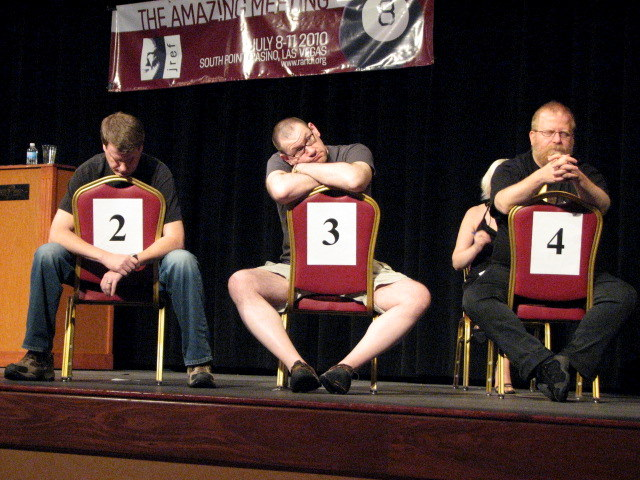
Hal Bidlack, Derek Colanduno and others are "viewed" by paranormal applicant for a missing kidney – 2010

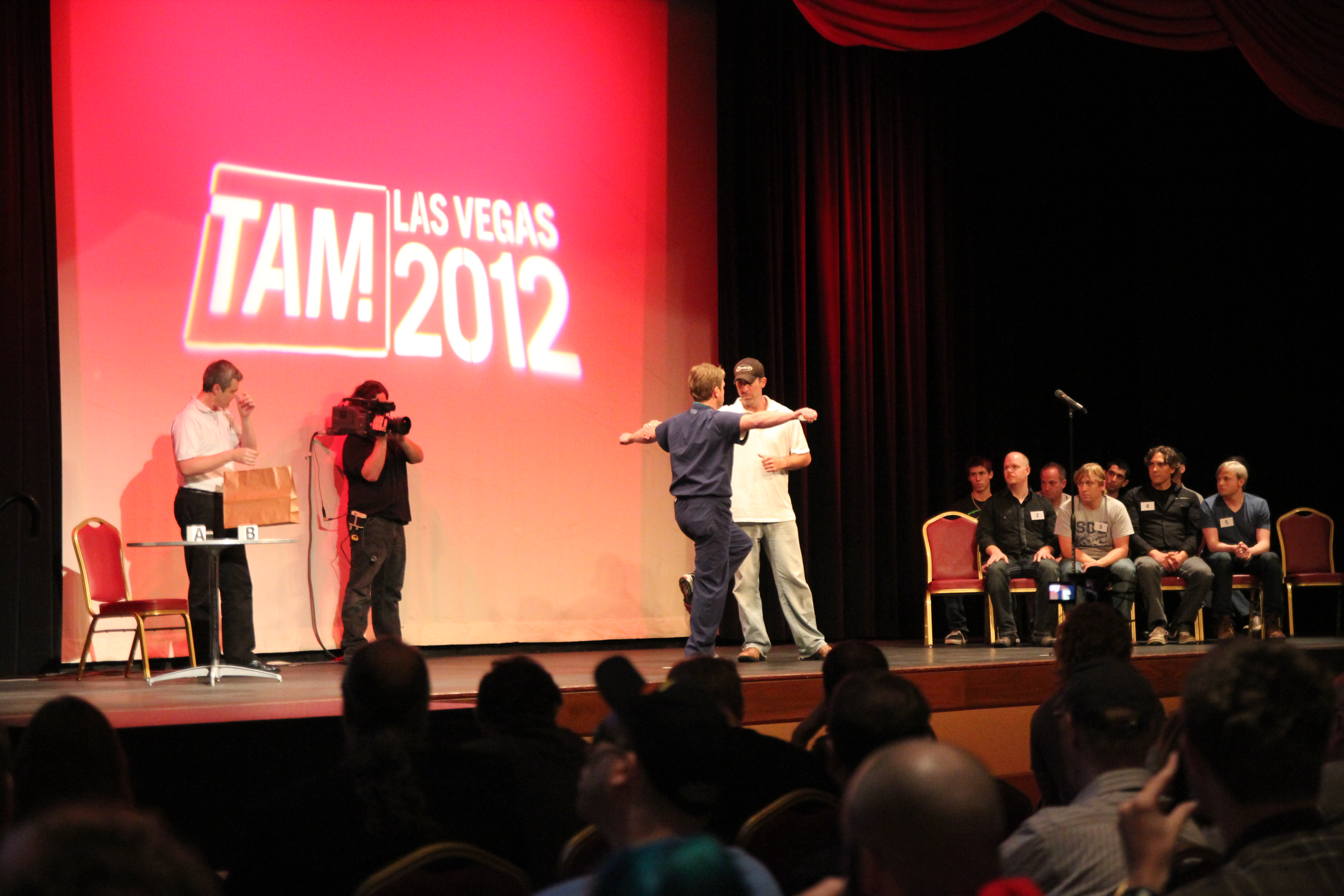
Performance-enhancing bracelet at TAM 2012

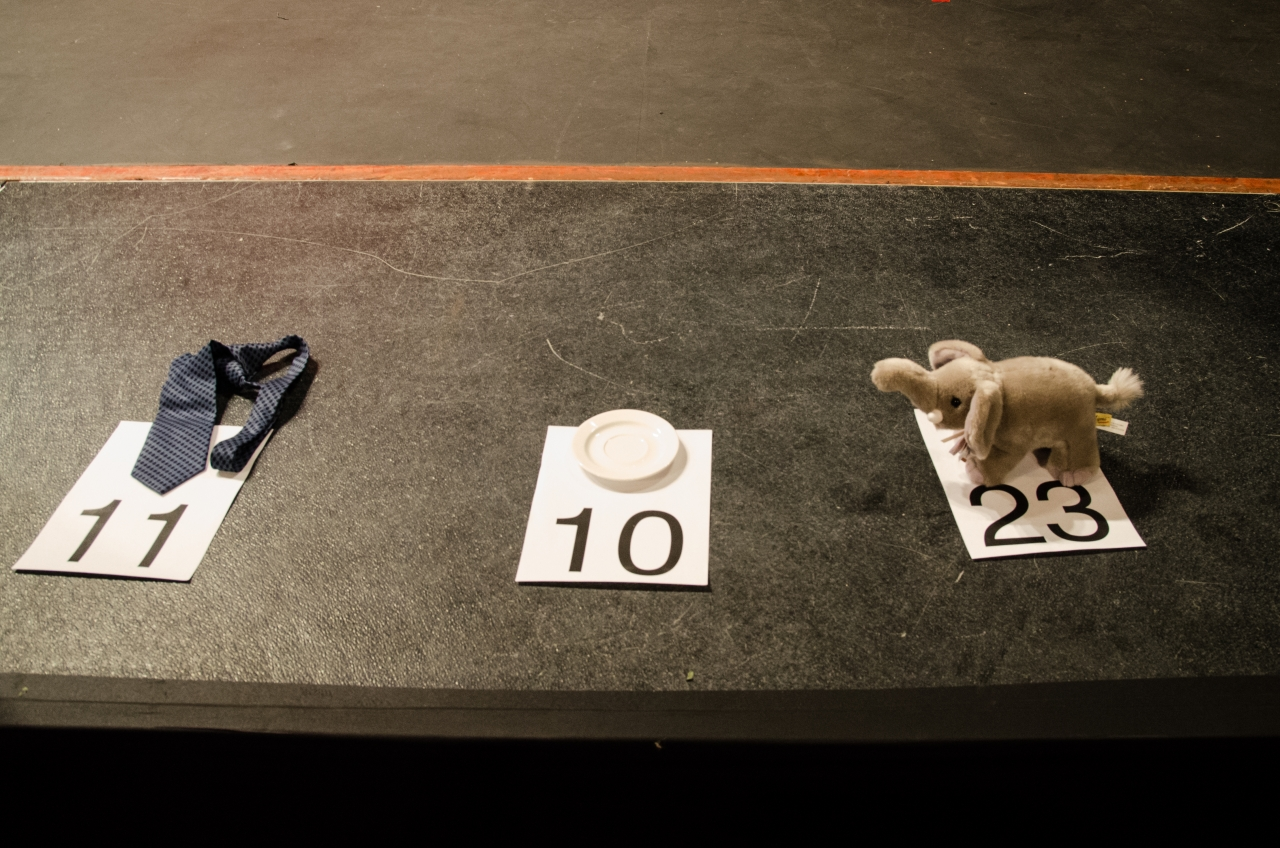
The 3 remote viewing objects from TAM 2013

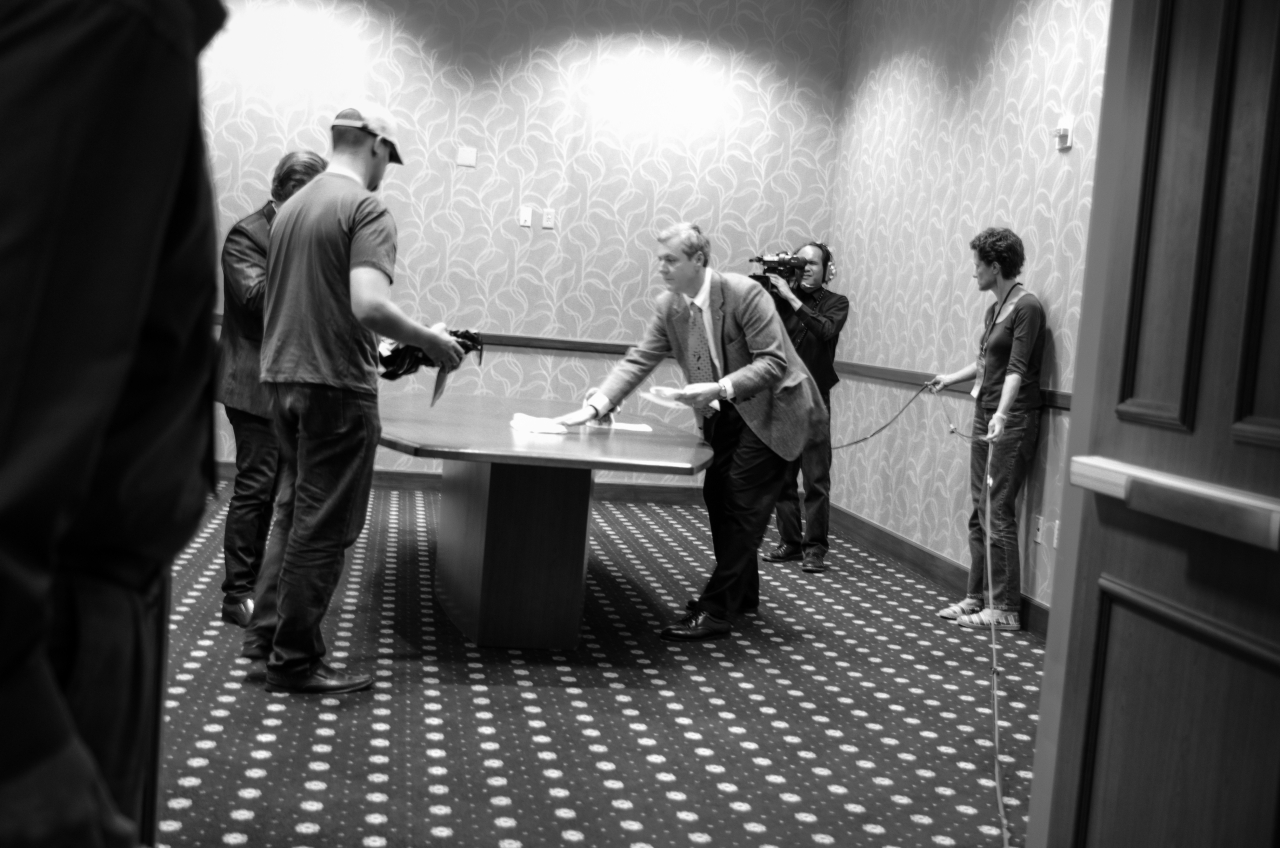
Richard Saunders in remote viewing room at TAM 2013

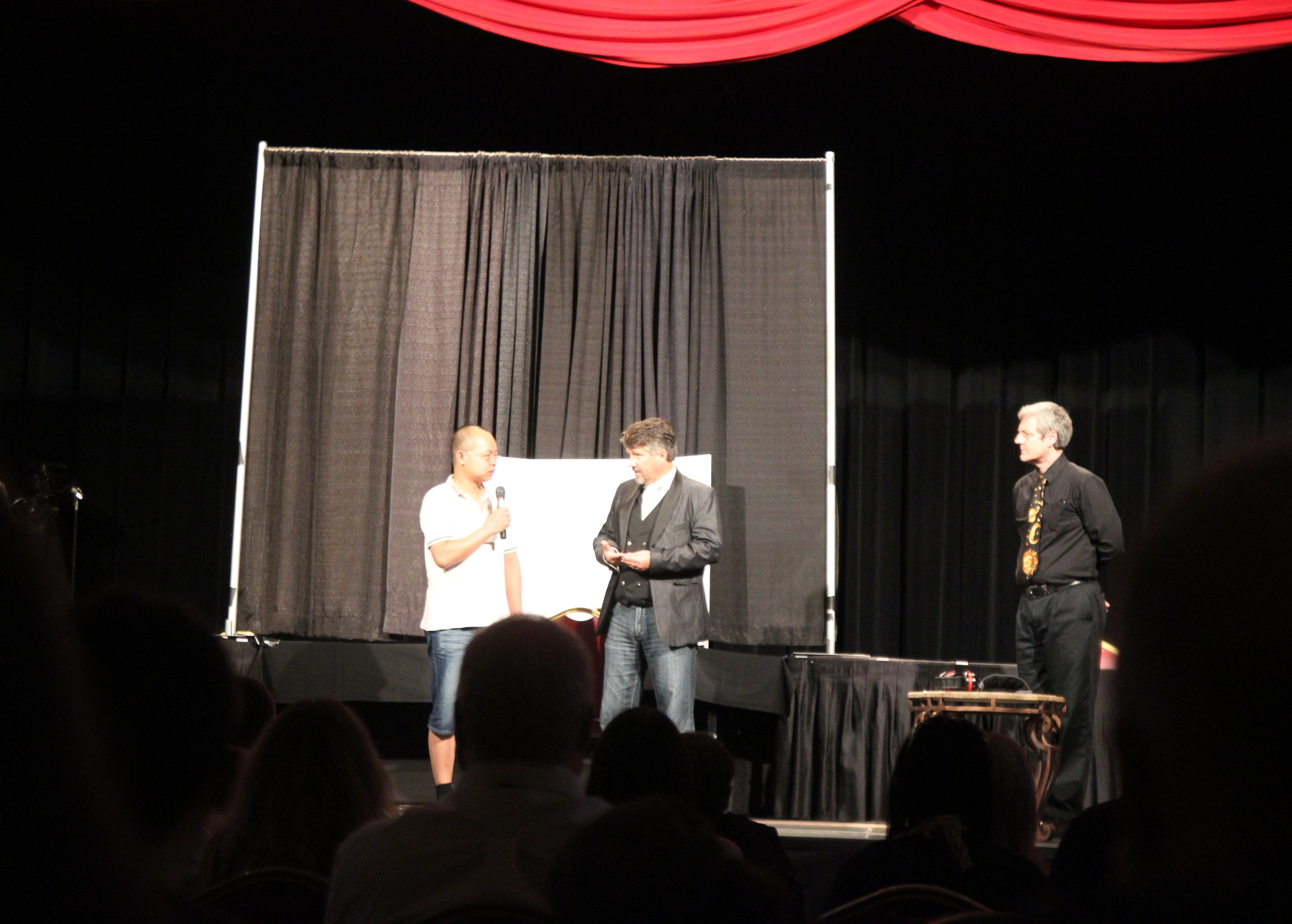
Fei Wang is applicant, Banachek and Richard Saunders are assisting TAM 2014

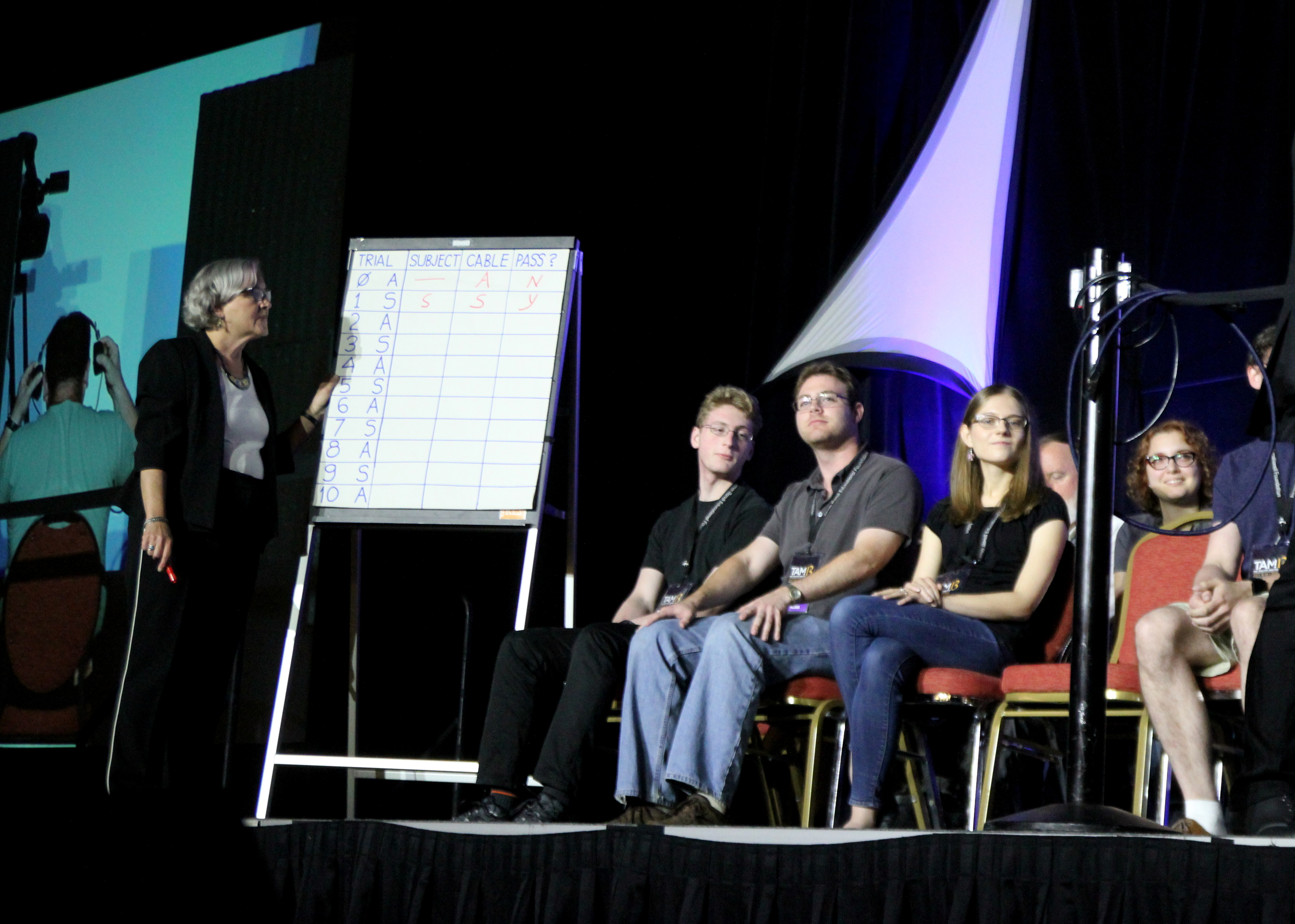
Demonstration test of Ethernet cables TAM13 – Grace Denman and volunteers – 2015

== See also ==
- Australian Skeptics $100,000 Prize
- List of prizes for evidence of the paranormal
- Stuart Landsborough's Psychic challenge
- SKEPP
- An Encyclopedia of Claims, Frauds, and Hoaxes of the Occult and Supernatural (by Randi)
