= Johan Braeckman =

Flemish philosopher (born 1965)

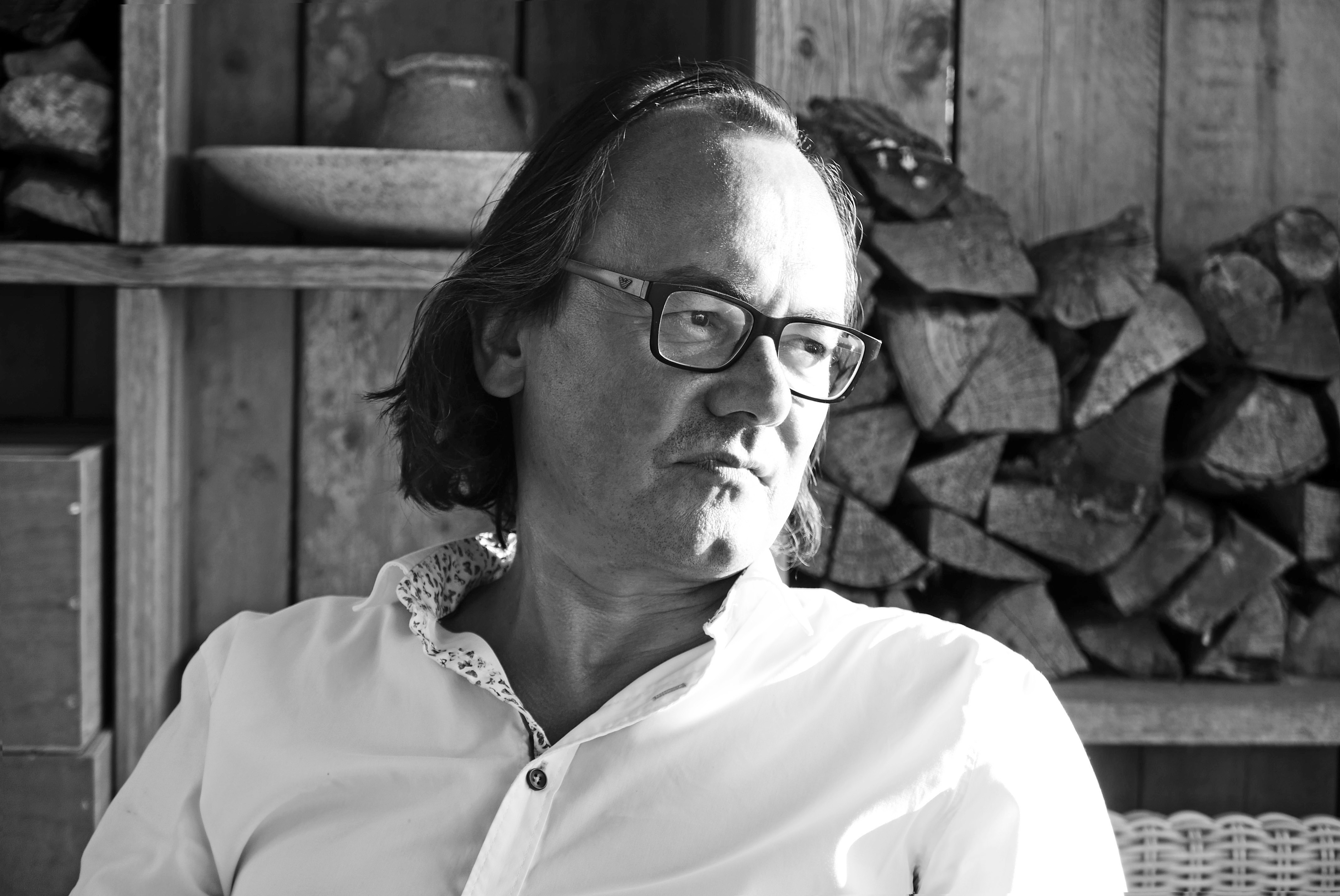
- Born: 1965 (age 60–61); Wetteren, Belgium
- Occupation: Philosopher

Philosophical work
- School: Scientific skepticism
- Main interests: Ecology, philosophical anthropology
- Website: www.johanbraeckman.be Johan Braeckman's voice Recorded September 2015

Johan Braeckman (born 1965 in Wetteren) is a Flemish philosopher. He was a professor of philosophy at the University of Ghent and taught at various other institutions e.g. University of Amsterdam. He is editor of the skeptical organisation SKEPP's magazine Wonder en is gheen Wonder. His research, conducted along with a dozen doctoral and postdoctoral researchers, focuses on the philosophical problems associated with the life sciences, in particular the evolutionary theory and neuroscience.

== Publications ==
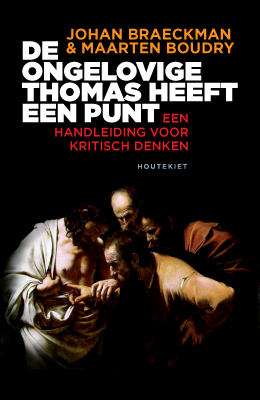
De ongelovige Thomas heeft een punt cover.

- Copyright – Een bio-ethisch essay – Katrien Devolder en Johan Braeckman – Universitaire Pers Leuven 2001 – ISBN 90-5867-154-2
- Darwins Moordbekentenis – De ontwikkeling van het denken van Charles Darwin – Johan Braeckman – Uitgeverij Nieuwezijds 2001 – ISBN 90-5712-125-5
- Ethiek van DNA tot 9/11 – Johan Braeckman, Bert de Reuver en Thomas Vervisch (red.) – Amsterdam University Press 2005 – ISBN 90-5356-753-4
- De rivier van Herakleitos. Een eigenzinnige visie op de wijsbegeerte – Etienne Vermeersch en Johan Braeckman – Houtekiet 2008
- Kritisch denken. Hoorcollege over het ontwikkelen van heldere ideeën en argumenten. (audio-cd of MP3) – Johan Braeckman – Home Academy 2011, Nederland – ISBN 9789085300731
- Goed, beter, best? Over de maakbaarheid van de mens. – Johan Braeckman, Aeneas De Baets, Johan Declercq, Ignaas Devisch, Marjan Joris en Liesbet Lauwereys (red.) – Academia Press 2011 – ISBN 9789038217123
- Darwin en de evolutietheorie. Een hoorcollege over zijn leven, denken en de gevolgen van zijn werk. (audio-cd of MP3) – Johan Braeckman – Home Academy 2010, Nederland – ISBN 9789085300847
- The Moral Brain. Essays on the Evolutionary and Neuroscientific Aspects of Morality. – Jan Verplaetse, Jelle De Schrijver, Sven Vanneste en Johan Braeckman (eds.) – Springer 2009 – ISBN 9781402062865
- De ongelovige Thomas heeft een punt. Een handleiding voor kritisch denken van Johan Braeckman en Maarten Boudry, verkozen tot 'Liberales-boek van het jaar 2011'. – Houtekiet – ISBN 9789089241887
- Fascinerend leven. Markante figuren en ideeën uit de geschiedenis van de biologie – Johan Braeckman en Linda Van Speybroeck – Academie Press 2013
- Recht maken wat krom is?, Een hoorcollege over bio-ethiek – Johan Braeckman – Home Academy 2015, Nederland – ISBN 9789085301370
- Valkuilen van ons denken, Een hoorcollege over de kracht van kritisch denken – Johan Braeckman – Home Academy 2017, Nederland – ISBN 9789085301691
- Arthur Conan Doyle. Een hoorcollege over zijn leven, werk en zijn creatie Sherlock Holmes – Jean Paul Van Bendegem, Johan Braeckman en Vitalski – Home Academy 2017, Nederland
- Er was eens – over de mens als vertellende aap – Johan Braeckman – Confituur 2017 – ISBN 9789089245892 (the picture for the cover of this essay is made by his partner, photographer Gwenny Cooman).
- Etienne Vermeersch – Nagelaten geschriften – Johan Braeckman en Dirk Verhofstadt – Hautekiet 2019 – ISBN 9789089247537
- Frankenstein. Een hoorcollege over Mary Shelley's creatie in wetenschaps- en cultuurhistorisch perspectief – Jean Paul Van Bendegem, Johan Braeckman en Vitalski – Home Academy 2019, Nederland
