= Etienne Vermeersch =

Belgian philosopher (1934–2019)

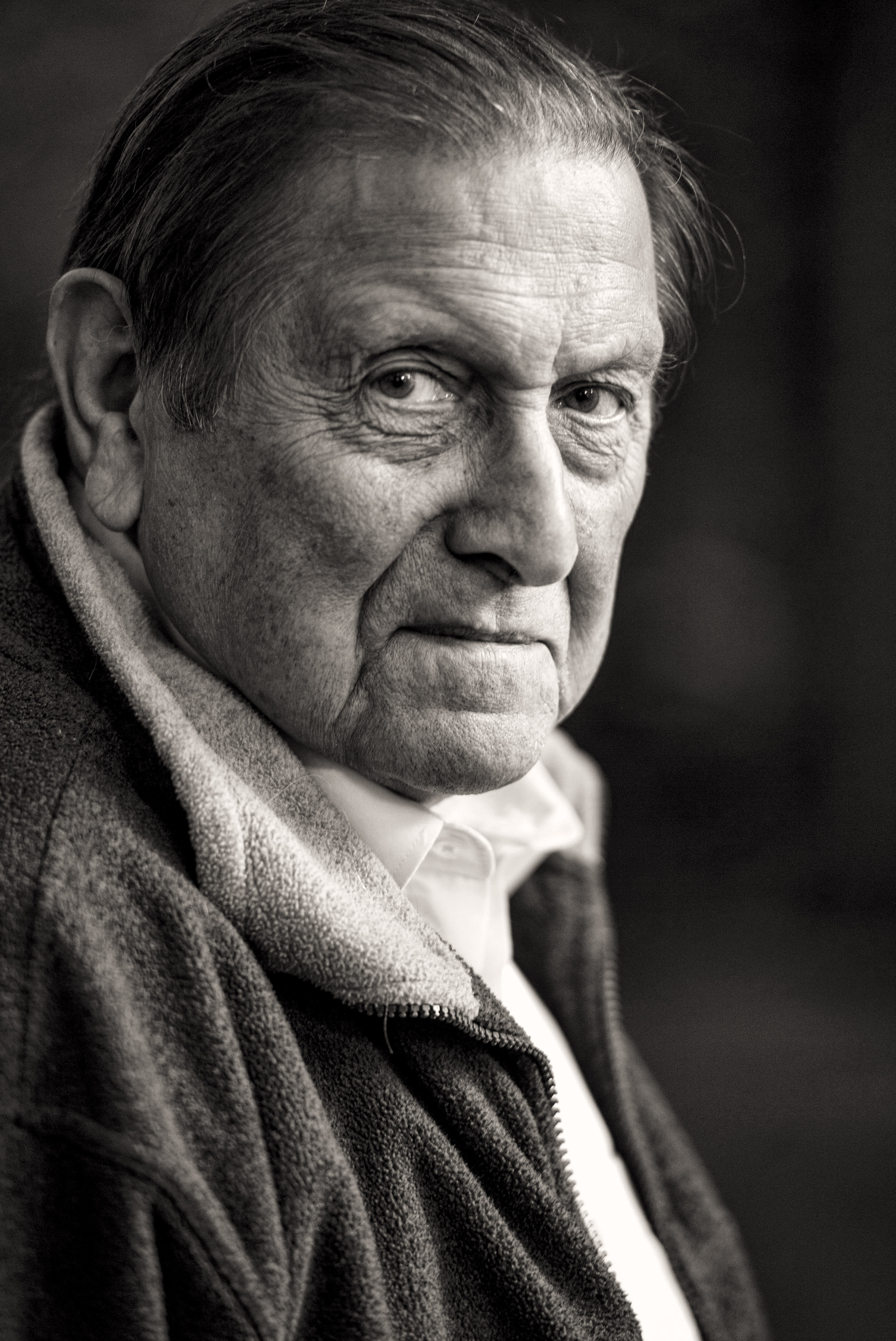
- Vermeersch in 2015
- Born: Etienne Vermeersch; 2 May 1934; Sint-Michiels, Bruges, Belgium
- Died: 18 January 2019 (aged 84); Ghent, Belgium

Education
- Education: Ghent University

Philosophical work
- Era: 20th-century philosophy, 21st-century philosophy
- Region: Western Philosophy
- Institutions: Ghent University
- Main interests: Philosophy of science, History of philosophy, History of Christianity, Bioethics, Environmental philosophy, Moral philosophy, cultural criticism
- Website: http://www.etiennevermeersch.be

Etienne Vermeersch (2 May 1934, Sint-Michiels, Bruges – 18 January 2019, Ghent) was a Belgian moral philosopher, skeptic, opinion maker and debater. He is one of the founding fathers of the abortion, euthanasia law, and the Law on Patients' Rights in Belgium. Vermeersch became an atheist after five years with the Society of Jesus (Jesuits). Later he became a philosophical materialist. In January 2008, Vermeersch was chosen by hundred prominent Flemings as the most influential intellectual of Flanders. He died in a hospital in Ghent on 18 January 2019 by euthanasia after a long illness.

== Career ==
Etienne Vermeersch had an MA in classical philology and in philosophy. In 1965 he obtained his PhD on the philosophical implications of information theory and cybernetics at Ghent University, Belgium. He became a professor at Ghent University in 1967. For decades he taught Philosophy of science, History of philosophy, 20th-century philosophy, Philosophical anthropology and History of christianity.

He worked on the foundations of the social sciences, on the philosophical aspects of research into informatics, on Artificial Intelligence, and on general social and ethical problems, mainly with regard to Bioethics, Environmental philosophy, and Cultural philosophy.

He was a Vice-Rector at Ghent University from 1993 until 1997. He was, among others, a member of the Flemish Board for Scientific Policy, of the governmental board of the Flemish Institute for Biotechnology, member of the Environmental Board of Flanders, and member of the Federal Board for Science Policy. He was also President of the Advisory Committee of Bioethics. The Medical Assisted Reproduction Act, the Scientific Research Act, even the Transgender Act would not be what they are today in Belgium without Vermeersch's input. The legalization of therapeutic cloning, which sparked heated debate in the Senate, overcame it thanks to its ethical considerations.

== Publications ==
Etienne Vermeersch published:

- 80 Bio-ethical, philosophical, socio-cultural and scientific articles
- 10 lemmas in the Encyclopaedia of World Literature
- Many (opinion) articles in newspapers, magazines and journals
- 3 syllabi of his colleges
- 15 books (a selection):
  - An Epistemological Introduction to the Science of Man, Pub. De Tempel, 1967 (401 pp.)
  - Current Philosophy, Pub. Gakko, 1970 (151 pp.)
  - An Analysis of the Concept of Culture, Bernardi/Bernardo, ed. – The Concept and Dynamics of Culture, World Anthropology, The Hague, Mouton, 1977 (9–73 pp.)
  - The Panda's Eyes: An Environmentally Philosophical Essay, Pub. Van de Wiele, 1988 (72 pp.) – a new version published at Pub. Houtekiet, 2010 (160 pp.)
  - Environment, Ethics and Cultures, Biosphere and Economy, Brussels, C.E.C., 1990, (1–40 pp.).
  - Provençaalse gesprekken – Etienne Vermeersch and Willy Weyns – Academic & Scientific publishers, 2013 (pp. 384). Nieuwe druk: Houtekiet, 2020, (208 pp.)
  - From Antigone to Dolly (1997) – an edited volume containing articles spanning his entire career was re-published, Pub. Houtekiet, 2019 (295 pp.)
  - Atheïsm, Pub. Luster, 2010 (72 pp.)
  - The Multicultural Society, Pub. Luster, 2011 (70 pp.)
  - De ketter en de kerkvorst – Etienne Vermeersch and André Léonard, Pub. De Bezige Bij, 2014 (240 pp.)
  - On God, Pub. Vrijdag, 2016 (140 pp.).
  - De rivier van Herakleitos – Etienne Vermeersch and Johan Braeckman, Pub. Houtekiet, 2019.
  - Nagelaten Geschriften – Etienne Vermeersch (red. Johan Braeckman & Dirk Verhofstadt, 2019. (476 pp.) – posthume

== Skepticism ==
Professor Vermeersch was also a major Belgian skeptic. He was a founding member of SKEPP ('Research Society for Critical Evaluation of Pseudoscience and the Paranormal'). He lectured and published on this topic for more than 40 years.

In the 1990s there was some commotion in the Belgian media when Vermeersch wrote an article on rational and ethical grounds entitled Why the Christian God cannot exist.

Vermeersch considered the overpopulation of the earth as the most profound problem in the world and related it to the problem of overconsumption. He supported the human birth control of Taiwan since 1967 and later Thailand.

In the beginning of January 2005 he survived a second heart attack. He remained active as a prominent intellectual in Belgium and the Netherlands.

When he died he was widely seen as one of Belgium's most influential philosophers.

== Some other publications ==
- De zin van de begrafenis in de Griekse tragedie, Handelingen van het XXIVe Vlaamse Filologencongres, 1961, (pp. 16–36).
- Chtonische motieven bij Aischulos, Handelingen XVI der Koninklijke Nederlandse Maatschappij voor Taal- Letterkunde en Geschiedenis, 1962, (pp. 424–432).
- Information and philosophy, Studia Philosophica Gandensia, 1963, pp. 141–154.
- Het religieus levensstadium. In Kierkegaard Herdenking, Werken uitgegeven door het rectoraat van de Rijksuniversiteit te Gent, 1964. (pp. 33–40)
- Some Remarks on the Analysis of the Culture Concept, Studia Philosophica Gandensia, 1965, (pp. 161–213).
- Essai de definition d’un concept de forme comme notion de base liant le language de la cybernétique à celui des sciences humaines, 5th International Congress on Cybernetics, 1968, (pp. 3–10).
- Projet pour un homme artificiel, Le dossier de la Cybernétique, Marabout Université, 1968, pp. 198–217.
- Projekt umjetnog sovjeka, Izazov kibernetici, 1970, (pp. 179–198).
- Adorno und die Aufklärung, Philosophica Gandensia, 9, 1971, pp. 56–72.
- Wissenschaft Technik und Gesellschafskritik, Philosophica Gandensia, 12, 1973, (pp. 155–166).
- Rationality, Some Preliminary Remarks, Philosophica, 1974, (pp. 73–82).
- Can Science be Made Rational?, Philosophica, 1976, (pp. 151–168.)
- Televisie en moraal – achtste Vlaams Congres voor Communicatiewetenschap, 1978.
- Het medische beroepsgeheim: ethische grondslagen. In Vlaams tijdschrift voor gezondheidsrecht, 1989, pp. 197–215
- The Future of Anthropocentrism, Van Nispen, J. & Douwe, T., edd.; The Quest for Man, the Topicality of Philosophical Anthropology, Assen, Van Gorcum, 1991 (pp. 177–186).
- The Future of Environmental Philosophy, Zweers, W. & Boersema, J.J., edd., Ecology, Technology and Culture: Essays in Environmental Philosophy, The White Horse Press, Cambridge, 1994, (pp. 272–286).
- The Ethics of Human and Animal Experimentation, London, John Libbey, 1994, (pp. 3–12).
- "Droit de disposer de soi” versus “paternalisme”, in Masson J. & Schutyzer, K., (ed.), Agora. Les droits des citoyens européens et la santé, 1995, (pp. 75–79).
- with Lameire, N., Nephrological and moral aspects of physical torture, Nephrology, Dialysis and Transplantation, 1995, vol 1, (pp. 160–161).
- Ethical Aspects of Genetic Engineering, in: Sterckx, S.; Biotechnology, Patents and Morality, Aldershot, Brookfield USA, 1997, (pp. 107–113).
- Individual rights versus societal duties, Vaccine, 17, 1999, (pp. 814–817).
- Euthanasie in België, Filosofie en Praktijk, 2000, (pp. 48–56).
- Pain, what is it and why do we care? Symposium on ‘The science and philosophy of Pain’, Vlaams Diergeneeskundig Tijdschrift, 2001, 69, pp. 385–391.
- The Belgian Law on euthanasia, The Historical and Ethical Background, Acta Chirurgica Belgica, 2002 ...The Belgian Law on euthanasia
- The ethical and historical background of the Belgian and Dutch laws on euthanasia, Kurt Pavlic & Burkhart Bromm (ed.), Neurologie und Philosophie zum Schmerz, Göttingen, Vandenhoeck & Ruprecht, 2004....The Belgian and Dutch laws on euthanasia
- Introduction: A Plea for Rationality – Reading the Kyoto Protocol. Ethical Aspects of the Convention on Climate Change, Chicago Press, 2006.
- Free will: emotions and consciousness could contribute, Opinion – Nature I volume 459 I 25 June 2009.
- Hasty euthanasia? Don't believe everything 'The New Yorker' writes. Bernheim J. & Vermeersch E., De Morgen June 26, 2015.Hasty euthanasia?
- The Bible Myths – Joseph Ratzinger And The Nativity Legends. Vermeersch E. I Free Inquiry Vol 34, No. 1 – Dec. 2013.The Bible Myths
