= Abraham Kovoor =

Sri Lankan rationalist and professor (1898–1978)

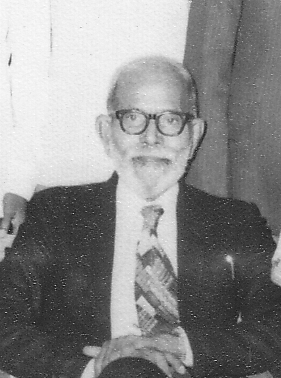
- Abraham Thomas Kovoor
- Born: Abraham Thomas Kovoor; 10 April 1898; Thiruvalla, Kingdom of Travancore
- Died: 18 September 1978 (aged 80); Colombo, Sri Lanka
- Family: Iype Thoma Kathanar (father)

Abraham Thomas Kovoor (10 April 1898 – 18 September 1978) was an Indian professor and rationalist who gained prominence after retirement for his campaign to expose as frauds various Indian and Sri Lankan "god-men" and so-called paranormal phenomena. His direct, trenchant criticism of spiritual frauds and organized religions was enthusiastically received by audiences, initiating a new dynamism in the rationalist movement, especially in Sri Lanka and India.

== Early life and career ==
Abraham Kovoor was born into the aristocratic Kovoor family of Syrian Christians at Thiruvalla, Kerala. Kovoor was the son of Rev. Iype Thoma Kathanar (Kovoor Achen), Vicar General of the Mar Thoma Syrian Church of Malabar. After working briefly as a lecturer in botany at C.M.S.College in Kerala, Kovoor arrived in Ceylon in February 1928. Abraham's younger brother, Behanan was a renowned sociologist and psychologist. Before his arrival in Ceylon, Kovoor married Kunjamma, daughter of a judge. The couple had a son, Aries. Kovoor's first assignment in Ceylon was teaching botany at Jaffna College, Vaddukoddai for 15 years until 1943. Subsequently, he also taught at Richmond College, Galle, and St. Thomas College, Mount Lavinia from 1947 to 1953, before retiring in 1959 as a teacher at Thurstan College, Colombo. He also practiced hypnotherapy and applied psychology.

== As a rationalist ==
After retirement Kovoor devoted his life to the rationalist movement. He spent most of his time building up the Ceylon Rationalist Association, and was its president from 1960 to his death. He edited an annual journal, The Ceylon Rationalist Ambassador. Kovoor became a widower when his wife Konjamma died in 1976. In his will, he wrote as follows: "My body should not be buried on my death. The body of my wife also should not be buried. We have dedicated our bodies to the use of medical colleges on our death. I desire that my skeleton should be surrendered to Thurston College, Colombo, which I served for many years. I entrust this task to my son, Aries Kovoor, who is a professor at the Sorbonne University, Paris. My eyes should be donated to an eye bank immediately after death." Kovoor died on 18 September 1978 due to cancer. His skeleton is preserved inside one of the science labs in Thurstan College, Colombo.

== Publications and Kovoor's challenge ==
After his numerous encounters with god-men, astrologers, and other people who claimed to have psychic powers, Kovoor concluded that there was no objective truth to such claims. He wrote, "Nobody has and nobody ever had supernatural powers. They exist only in the pages of scriptures and sensation-mongering newspapers." His books Begone Godmen and Gods, Demons and Spirits, about his encounters with people claiming psychic powers, are still bestsellers in India.

In 1963, Kovoor announced an award of Rs. 100,000 for anyone who could demonstrate supernatural or miraculous powers under foolproof and fraud-proof conditions. The challenge listed 23 miracles or feats that godmen (and Western mystics and performers such as Uri Geller and Jeane Dixon) claimed to perform, such as reading the serial numbers from currency in sealed envelopes, materializing objects, predicting future events, converting liquids from one kind to another, and walking on water. Some sought publicity by taking on his challenge, but they forfeited the initial deposit amount. The Sri Lankan Rationalist Association, led by Professor Carlo Fonseka, renewed the challenge in 2012 and increased the reward to one million dollars. (Similar challenges have been posed by Basava Premanand and James Randi.)

== Legacy ==
The Malayalam movie Punarjanmam (1972), Tamil movie Maru Piravi (1973) and Telugu film Ninthakatha were made on the basis of his case diary. Aamir Khan's character in PK (2014) is inspired by Kovoor. Bharathiya Yuktivadi Sangam declared a national award called the A. T. Kovoor Award for the Secular Artist. The first recipient was Indian film star Kamal Haasan in acknowledgment of his humanist activities and secular life.

Kovoor's work remains controversial in India. In 2008, Punjab Chief Minister Parkash Singh Badal, leader of Shiromani Akali Dal, imposed an "immediate ban" on Kovoor's God, Demons and Spirits, translated into Punjabi by Megh Raj Mitter. Popular rationalist Basava Premanand, founder of the Federation of Indian Rationalist Associations, was heavily influenced by Kovoor.

== Books by and on Kovoor ==
=== In English ===
1. Begone Godmen – Jaico Publishing House, Mumbai, India
2. Gods, Demons and Spirits – Jaico Publishing House, Mumbai, India
3. Selected Works of A T Kovoor – Indian Atheist Publishers, New Delhi, India
4. Exposing Paranormal Claims – Indian CSICOP, Podannur, Tamil Nadu, India
5. Soul, Spiril, Rebirth & Possession – Indian CSICOP, Podannur, Tamil Nadu, India
6. On Christianity – Indian CSICOP, Podannur, Tamil Nadu, India
7. On Buddhism – Indian CSICOP, Podannur, Tamil Nadu, India
8. Astrology & Hinduism – Indian CSICOP, Podannur, Tamil Nadu, India

=== In Kannada ===
1. Kovoor Kanda Vaigynanika Sathyagalu, (Anuvaada – K. Mayigowda, Sapna Book House Bangalore).
2. Devaru Devva Vignana, (Anuvaada Navakarnataka Publications Bangalore).

=== In Tamil ===
1. Kora Iravukal, Veerakesari Publications, Colombo
2. ManakolangkaL, Veerakesari Publications, Colombo

=== In Malayalam ===
1. Kovoorinte Sampoorna Kruthikal (Complete Works of Kovoor) – Translated by Joseph Edamaruku.
2. Kovoorinte Thiranjetutha Kruthikal (Selected Works of Kovoor) – Translated by Joseph Edamaruku. Prabhat Book House, Thiruvananthapuram, Kerala, India.
3. Samsarikkunna Kuthira (The Talking Horse) – Translated by Joseph Edamaruku. Current Books, Thrissur, Kerala, India.
4. Yukthivadam (Rationalism) – Translated by Joseph Edamaruku. Current Books, Thrissur, Kerala, India.
5. Anamarutha – Translated by Joseph Edamaruku. D C Books, Kottayam, Kerala, India.
6. Indriyatheetha Jnanavum Parapsychologiyum – Translated by Joseph Edamaruku. Indian Atheist Publishers, New Delhi, India.
7. Yukthichintha (Rational Thought) – Translated by Johnson Eyeroor. Current Books, Kottayam, Kerala, India.

=== In Hindi ===
1. Aur Dev Purush Har Gaye – Tarakbharti Parkashan, Barnala, Punjab, India
2. Dev, daanav aur Ruhain – Tarakbharti Parkashan

=== In Punjabi ===
1. Tey Dev Pursh Har Gaye – Tarakbharti Parkashan, Barnala, Punjab
2. Pret Atma Puner Janam Te Kasran – Tarakbharti Parkashan
3. Kramatan Da Pardan Phash – Tarakbharti Parkashan
4. Dev, Daint te Ruhan – Tarakbharti Parkashan

=== In Sinhala ===
1. Deviyo Saha Bhoothayo – A Translation by Dharmapala Senarante
2. Ma Kala Gaveshana – A Translation by Dharmapala Senarante

=== In Bengali ===
1. Bhut Bhagaban Shaitan bonam Dr. Kovoor – Bhabani Prasad Shahoo
