= Wim Betz =

Flemish physician (1943–2019)

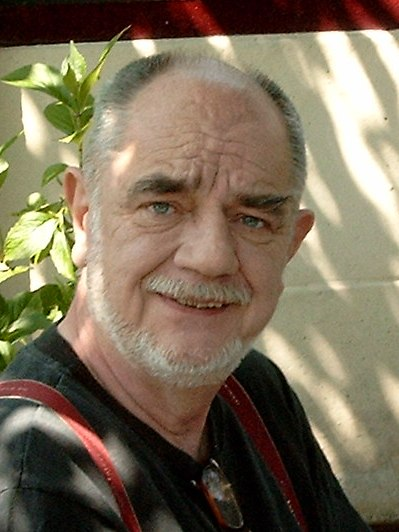
Wim Betz

Willem (Wim) Betz (22 February 1943 – 8 June 2019) was a Flemish physician and professor emeritus at the Belgian university Vrije Universiteit Brussel (VUB), where he was head of the center for training in general medical practice until November 2007. Betz was a leading skeptic in Flanders and participant in the EU COST B4 Project (a European initiative for comprehensive research on complementary and alternative medicine). He was a founding member, president and vice-president of the Belgian skeptic organisation SKEPP.

== Biography ==
After twenty years as a general practitioner, he turned full-time to the teaching of general medical practice as well as conducting scientific research. He took courses in several types of alternative medicine (homeopathy, neural therapy, manual therapy) and practiced them successfully. However, he started to question the explanations given for the successes that were being claimed by alternative treatments and began to investigate the existing evidence for these methods. According to Betz, the explanations can be found in the field of psychosomatics (which studies how the mind can affect the body), in the placebo effect, in the fact that many illnesses disappear spontaneously (e.g., common colds) or fluctuate (e.g., allergies), as well as in the deceptive methods of quackery.

== Skeptic ==
Betz was a co-founder of SKEPP, a non-profit organisation that promotes scientific skepticism in Belgium, where he started as secretary and then led as president and vice-president from 2005 to 2013. At SKEPP he was the expert in alternative medicine and the relevant legislation. He has participated actively in the debate on near-death experiences, following the publication of an article by the Dutch cardiologist Pim van Lommel. Betz was also involved in the creation of the EU COST B4 Report. The report describes the scientific criteria and conditions for alternative medical practices before they can be recognized as a medical profession. Betz is also a fellow of the Committee for Skeptical Inquiry.

Betz became professor emeritus in October 2007. He died on 8 June 2019 after a long illness.

== Awards ==
In 2012 Betz was presented with the European Council of Skeptical Organisations' Outstanding Skeptics Award at the 6th World Skeptics Congress.

Awarded the Gebroeders Bruinsma Erepenning by Vereniging tegen de Kwakzalverij (Society against Quackery).
