= SKEPP =

Belgian sceptical organisation founded in 1990

- Formation: 8 June 1990
- Type: non-profit
- Purpose: promotion of scientific skepticism
- Region served: Belgium (Flanders and Brussels)
- Website: http://www.skepp.be
- Remarks: Pronunciation of 'Studiekring voor Kritische Evaluatie van Pseudowetenschap en het Paranormale'

SKEPP is an independent Belgian organization that promotes scientific skepticism. The organization’s name is a backronym for Studiekring voor de Kritische Evaluatie van Pseudowetenschap en het Paranormale ("Study Circle for the Critical Evaluation of Pseudoscience and the Paranormal").

== Foundation ==
SKEPP is a nonprofit organization emanated from the Belgian astronomical society, Vereniging voor Sterrenkunde, and was founded in 1990 by, among others, Etienne Vermeersch, Willem Betz, Tim Trachet and Jean Paul Van Bendegem.

== Goals ==
The goals of the organization are:

- To conduct critical research into claims that are either highly unlikely based on or contradicting current scientific knowledge. Specifically, SKEPP focuses on pseudoscientific claims as well as claims of paranormal events.
- Not to reject claims or theories a priori. Their value is only determined after critical examination and an objective assessment of all arguments, free from philosophical, religious, and political views.
- To collect and to make available literature, documents, and other materials that relate to the above-mentioned claims.
- To communicate the results of its own and others' critical research by publishing a periodical, organizing lectures and conferences, and conducting educational outreach via media, schools, etc.
- To maintain contacts with organizations who share these or similar goals.

== Activities ==
SKEPP gets most of its funding from member fees. On the initiative of board member and former editor-in-chief Tom Schoepen, SKEPP has been publishing its own quarterly magazine since 2000, Wonder en is gheen wonder, a magazine for science and reason, which focuses on both pseudoscientific topics and topics related to the philosophy of science. The editors include Johan Braeckman (Ghent University), Griet Vandermassen (Ghent University), Geerdt Magiels, and SKEPP founder Tim Trachet.

In 2012, SKEPP hosted a series of lectures and discussions, featuring prominent scientists and philosophers, under the name Het Denkgelag, which has since grown out to become an independent non-profit that organises skeptical conferences. In 2015, SKEPP hosted the meant-to-be-yearly event "Zomerschool Kritisch Denken" (Summerschool Critical Thinking) aimed at educational professionals. Currently, SKEPP organises the monthly local editions of Skeptics in the Pub in Ghent, Antwerp and Leuven.

Since 1996 SKEPP gives out annual awards to non-members: the Zesde vijs (the “Sixth Screw”) and the Skeptische Put (de “Skeptical Pit”).

The Zesde Vijs is awarded to "someone who has distinguished themselves in the past year in spreading objective knowledge regarding pseudoscience and the paranormal, or who has made themselves noticed in the media by presenting a nuanced critical view or a thoroughly documented argumentation". This prize has been awarded to, among others:

- Stijn Bruers (2015)
- Maggie De Block (2014)
- Marleen Finoulst (2013)
- Ruben Mersch (2012)
- The Science Editorial Staff of the Flemish daily newspaper De Standaard (2011)
- The TV program Ook getest op mensen, VRT – Eén (2010)
- Ilse van Lysebeth and Ellen Vermeulen (2009)
- Bruno Clément from the RTBF current affairs program Questions à la Une (2008)
- Jan Vanlangendonck from the Flemish radio channel Radio 1 (2007)
- Journalist and philosopher Joël de Ceulaer from the Flemish magazine Knack (2005)
- Journalist Mark Eeckhaut from De Standaard (2004)
- Former dean of Ghent University Prof. Dr. Andreas De Leenheer (2003)
- Communication scientists Prof. Dr. Els De Bens and Dr. Karin Raeymaeckers (2002)
- The Flemish radio program Jongens en Wetenschap (2001)
- Journalist Wim Daems from the Belgian science magazine Eos (1999)
- Dutch psychologist Hans Crombach (1998)
- Physicist Jean Bricmont (1997)
- Historian and moral philosopher Prof. Dr. Gie van den Berghe (1996)

The Skeptische Put is awarded to "someone who, according to SKEPP, has displayed exceptionally uncritical thinking and who has totally misunderstood the popularization of science and knowledge". The Skeptische Put has been awarded to, among others:

- Jan Allein (2014)
- Peter Vereecke (2013)
- Patrick Geryl (2012)
- Chris Vermeire (2010)
- Chris Gaublomme, voorzitter vzw Preventie Vaccinatieschade (2009)
- Peter Aelbrecht (2008)
- Vijf TV - My mind and body (2007)
- The three major Belgian health insurance organizations: Socialistische Mutualiteiten, Landsbond der Christelijke Mutualiteiten en Liberale Mutualiteit (2003),
- Journalist Willem J. Duckaert in the Belgian magazines Blik (journal) and maar Natuurlijk! (2002)
- Psychology professor Stephan Lievens for his book Tussen de lijnen! Over grafologie (2001)
- Test Aankoop en Test Gezondheid van Verbruikersunie Test Aankoop (2000)
- Singer Ingeborg Sergeant (1999)
- VELAZQUEZ (Paranormal Consulting) (1997)

== Media ==
Since its founding, SKEPP has become quite widely known via the Belgian media. They are often called upon to present their critical perspective on paranormal or pseudoscientific topics. In 2004 the organization made headlines when thirty skeptics at Ghent University conducted a “mass suicide” attempt by taking an overdose of diluted snake venom, belladonna, and arsenic. The goal of this action was to demonstrate that homeopathic products contain no active ingredients. Additionally, the Belgian health insurance organization were accused of putting themselves above the law as commercial entities by reimbursing alternative treatments. According to SKEPP, by reimbursing alternative treatments, health insurance organizations give the impression to the Belgian public that these are effective medications or treatments.

In 2014, the Belgian court of appeal in Brussels proved SKEPP right against the appeal of the Dutch physician Robert Görter, who was called a quack by the organization in 2004.

== Legal Action ==
SKEPP has a history of defending their authors against SLAPP (Strategic lawsuit against public participation) lawsuits when their authors are sued for writing articles critical of pseudoscience such as the most recent lawsuit where they were sued by for an article written by Patrick Vermeren that was critical of alpha training. A decision by the Court of Appeal (England and Wales) sided with SKEPP.

== The One Million Euro Sisyphus Prize ==
Since 1 October 2012 the organization has pledged to award the 1-million-euro Sisyphus prize, to anyone who can demonstrate paranormal abilities under controlled conditions. This includes paranormal phenomena as well as homeopathy. The same challenge is also offered by various other European skeptical organizations and serves as the equivalent of the American One Million Dollar Paranormal Challenge, which was offered by the James Randi Educational Foundation.

As of 8 March 2014, its website describes the prize as "the 25,000 euro prize". Applying for the prize would cost 50 euros. It informs that "the text and protocol are being rewritten and will soon be available again".

== See also ==
- Comité Para
- Het Denkgelag
- List of skeptical organizations
