= Basava Premanand =

Indian skeptic and rationalist (1930–2009)

- Basava Premanand in June 2008
- Born: 17 February 1930; Kozhikode, Kerala, India
- Died: 4 October 2009 (aged 79); Podanur, Tamil Nadu, India
- Occupations: Rationalist, skeptic, owner-writer-publisher of the monthly magazine The Indian Skeptic

Basava Premanand (17 February 1930 – 4 October 2009) was an Indian skeptic and rationalist from Kerala. He organised many tours around rural India for the promotion of scientific thinking, exposing alleged miracles and scams carried out by various charlatans and godmen while spreading awareness of dangerous superstitions. Premanand was the founder of the Federation of Indian Rationalist Associations, the convener of Indian CSICOP, and the owner-publisher-editor of the monthly magazine The Indian Skeptic, which investigates paranormal claims in India.

== Early life ==
In the 1940s, Premanand quit school to take part in the Quit India Movement. With that his traditional schooling ended. His next seven years were spent in the newly started Sri-Steila Gurukula, where the Shantiniketan-Wardha brand of education was imparted. He was strongly influenced by Helena Blavatsky in his early years and in 1976 met the Sri Lankan skeptic Abraham Kovoor during his Miracle Exposure lecture tour in India. Since then, Premanand became a critic of Theosophy, and succeeded Kovoor after he died in 1978.

== Activism ==
Around 1975 Premanand started publicly denouncing the Indian godman Sathya Sai Baba, and devoted his life to exposing godmen and paranormal phenomena. He was arrested in 1986 by the police for marching, with 500 volunteers, towards Puttaparthi, the town where the guru's main ashram is located; in the same year he sued Sathya Sai Baba for materializing gold objects in violation of the Gold Control Act. The case was dismissed, whereupon Premanand put in an appeal on the ground that spiritual power is not a defence recognised in law, which was also unsuccessful. In 1993, he published his book Murders in Sai Baba's Bedroom, about the killing of six inmates at Sathya Sai Baba's ashram, which he claimed was overlooked by the authorities. His allegations against Sai Baba further include sexual and economic offences. Premanand claimed that he survived four murder attempts and bore injuries from beatings for his activism, and was known as one of Sathya Sai Baba's most vocal critics.

Premanand used his skills as an amateur magician to try to give a natural explanation for some of the alleged miracles of gurus and godmen. Guru Busters, the documentary by the British filmmaker Robert Eagle, features Premanand displaying and teaching his own interpretation and explanation for many supposedly supernatural stunts, such as levitation, flesh-piercing and live burials. He took an active part in the Vigyan Yatra ("Rally for Science") organised by Maharashtra Lok Vidnyan in 1982 to popularise science and scientific thinking, as well as in the Bharat Jan Vigyan Jatha held in 1987 espousing the same cause. He is also credited with the formation of the Maharashtra Andhashraddha Nirmoolan Samiti (ANiS) in 1989.

On 7 February 1997, Premanand founded the Federation of Indian Rationalist Associations, which tours Indian villages to spread his natural explanations of gurus and fakirs whom he considered frauds or self-deceived. He was the convener of Indian CSICOP, a Tamil Nadu-based skeptic group which is an affiliate of CSICOP. He was the owner-publisher-editor of the monthly magazine The Indian Skeptic, which "publishes articles on the scientific investigation of apparently paranormal occurrences with a special emphasis on cases from India".

Once referred to in a BBC anti-guru show as India's leading guru-buster, Premanand was "honoured by the government with its highest award for the promotion of scientific values among the public."

== The paranormal challenge ==
In 1963, Abraham Kovoor offered an award of INR100,000 to anyone who could demonstrate supernatural or miraculous powers under foolproof and fraud-proof conditions. After Kovoor's death in 1978, Premanand continued his challenge by offering INR100,000 to any person who could demonstrate psychic, supernatural of paranormal ability of any kind under satisfactorily observed conditions. This challenge has not been contested and won.

== Death ==
Premanand was diagnosed with cancer in 2006 and underwent major surgery. He died on 4 October 2009 at Podanur, Tamil Nadu and, according to his wishes, his body was donated to a local medical college. He was succeeded by Narendra Nayak and his property, assets and the copyright of his 26 books were given to The Federation for Indian Rationalists Association.

== Books and pamphlets ==
=== In English ===
1. Science versus Miracles
2. Lure of Miracles
3. Divine Octopus
4. The Storm of Godmen, God and Diamond Smuggling
5. Satya Sai Greed
6. Satya Sai Baba & Gold Control Act
7. Satya Sai Baba & Kerala Land Reforms Act
8. Investigate Balayogi
9. United Front - FIRA 2nd National Conference
10. Murders in Sai Baba's Bedroom
11. A. T. Kovoor Octogenary Souvenir

=== In Malayalam ===
1. Saibabayude Kalikal
2. Saidasikal Devadasikal
3. Pinthirippanmarude Masterplan

== See also ==
- List of prizes for evidence of the paranormal
- Prabir Ghosh
- Sanal Edamaruku
