= Puzzling World =

Optical illusion themed tourist attraction in New Zealand

Coordinates: 44.697°S 169.162°E

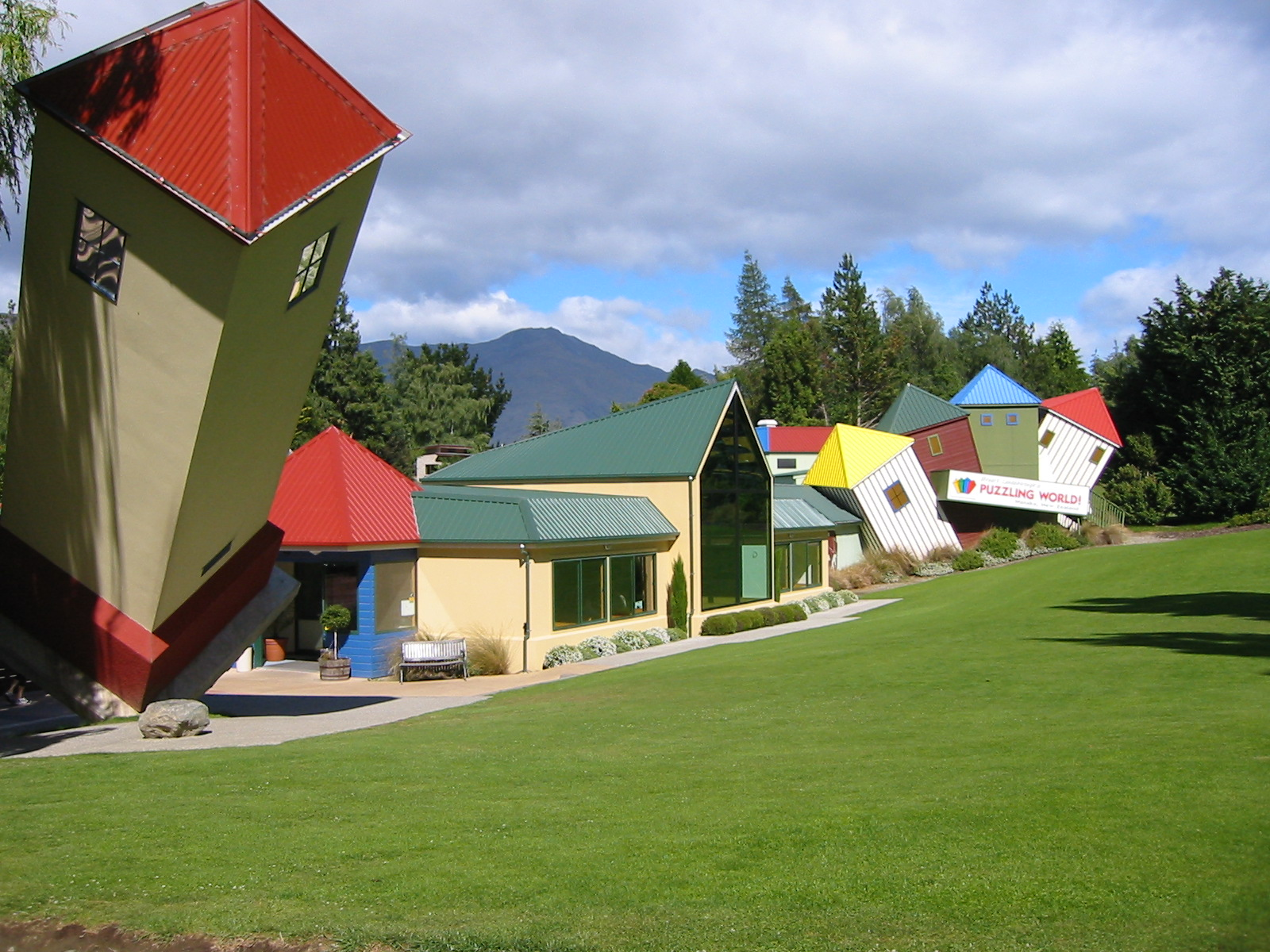
- Founded: 1973
- Founder: Stuart Landsborough
- Headquarters: Wānaka, New Zealand
- Website: www.puzzlingworld.co.nz

Puzzling World is a tourist attraction near Wānaka, New Zealand. It began as a single storey maze in 1973, gradually expanding to become an award-winning complex of optical illusions and puzzling rooms and the world's first 3-D maze. Puzzling World is well known for its Leaning Tower of Wanaka and eccentric lavatory styled as a Roman bathroom. As of 2020 Puzzling World had received in excess of 4 million visitors and was attracting around 200,000 people a year.

== History ==
Puzzling World, originally a single level wooden maze at Wānaka in the Queenstown area of New Zealand, opened in 1973. It was the brainchild of Stuart and Jan Landsborough who had been forced to sell their house to raise money for the venture after being refused a bank loan. In the first year the park received 17,600 visitors. A puzzle centre was added in 1979 and a second level added to the maze 3 years later. The park continued to develop with the signature Leaning Tower of Wanaka being added in 1999 with a backwards running clock face. Landsborough credits his father with instilling in him an imaginative business sense and believes that part of the reason for the park's earlier success is because he advertised to attract adults rather than children.

Since 2004 Puzzling World has been run by Stuart's daughter, Heidi, and her husband, operations manager Duncan Spear.

In 2010 the park began a $2.5 million extension that included sculptures designed by local artists, such as Wētā Workshop, props and effects designers for the Lord of the Rings trilogy.

The SculptIllusion Gallery was recipient of a national award in the New Zealand Commercial Building Awards 2014. In 2016 Puzzling World was the overall winner of the Ignite Wanaka Business Awards and was described as "high-performing, unique and sustainable...with very low staff turnover."

During the Wānaka earthquake of 2015 people had to be evacuated while some visitors reported they thought it was part of the experience.

Puzzling World is the official sponsor of Junior Challenge Wanaka, a junior triathlon and part of New Zealand's largest triathlon festival.

As of 2020 the site receives in the region of 200,000 visitors per annum.

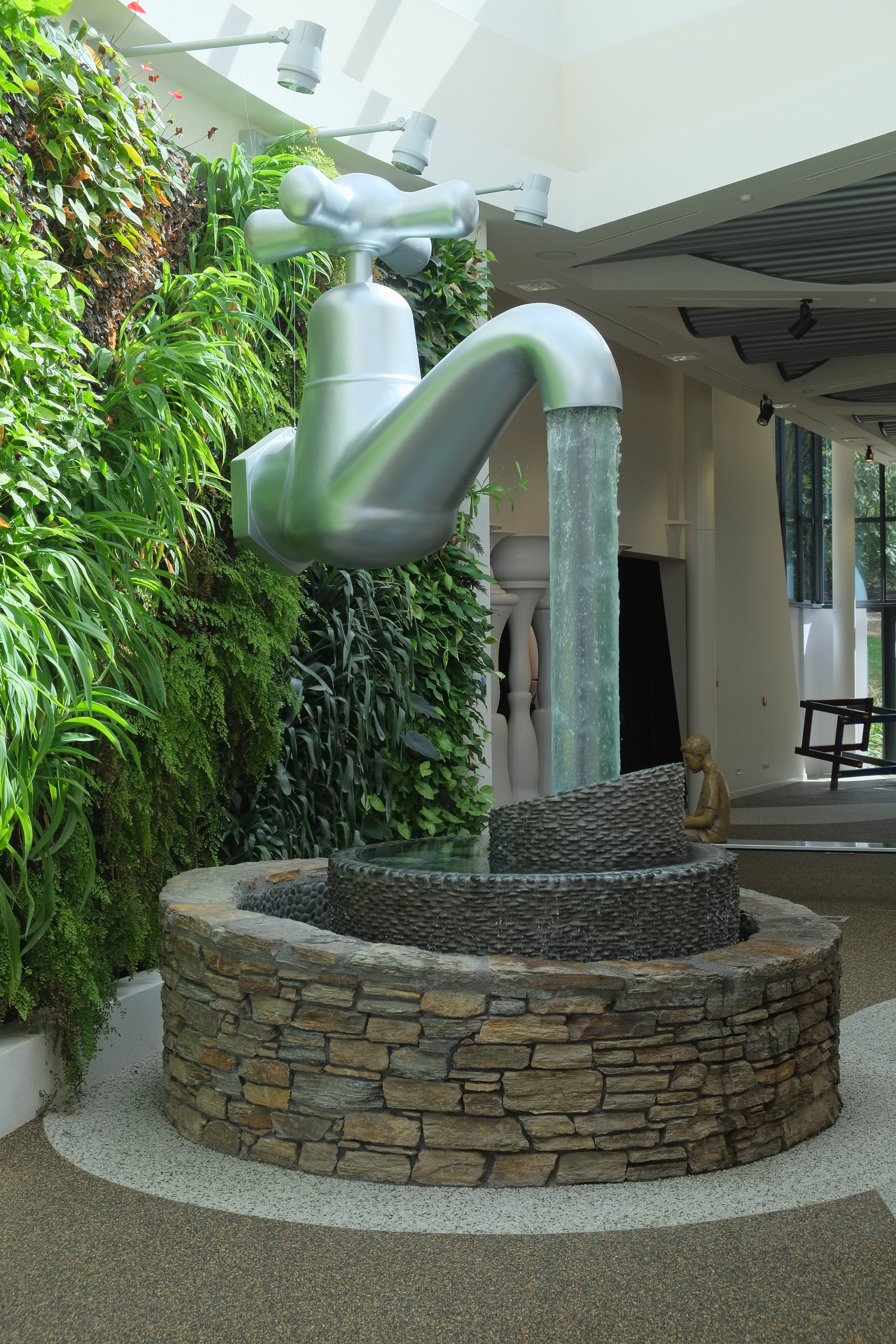
A seemingly floating tap in the SculptIllusion Gallery

== Attractions ==
=== The SculptIllusion Gallery ===
The Sculptillusion gallery is a large illusion room which opened in December 2012. It contains impossible objects, perspective paintings and reversible figures. The sculptures include a tap seemingly suspended in mid air and a floating bench, as well as architectural features such as a stone carpet and living wall, created by New Zealand sculptors and designers. The building also contains several Jerry Andrus illusions including Crazy Nuts (an impossible nuts and bolts interactive illusion) and The Magic Square logic puzzle. There is also an area devoted to exhibitions, the first dedicated to advertisements and familiar products which plays with how the viewer sees recognisable company logos. and more recently, "Un-useless" - A large display of impossible or useless inventions and creations by local sculptors and international artists aimed to amuse, confuse and amaze. Other features include stained glass windows with geometrical patterns and an area for conferences and events.

=== The Leaning Tower of Wanaka ===
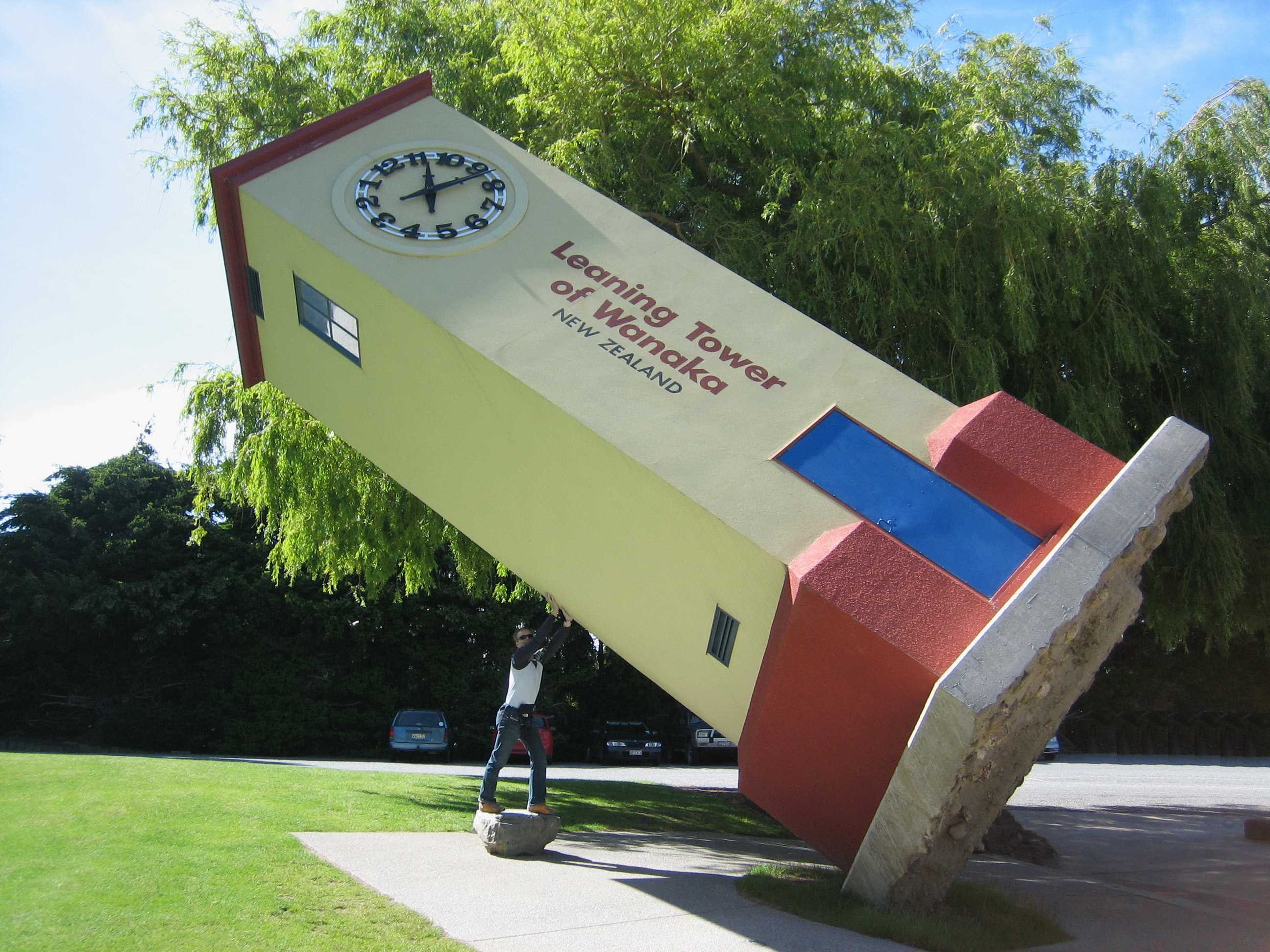
The Leaning Tower appearing to balance precariously on one corner

The Leaning Tower of Wanaka is a tower that is seemingly impossibly balanced on one corner, making the whole structure lean at an angle of 53 degrees to the ground.

=== Optical illusion rooms ===
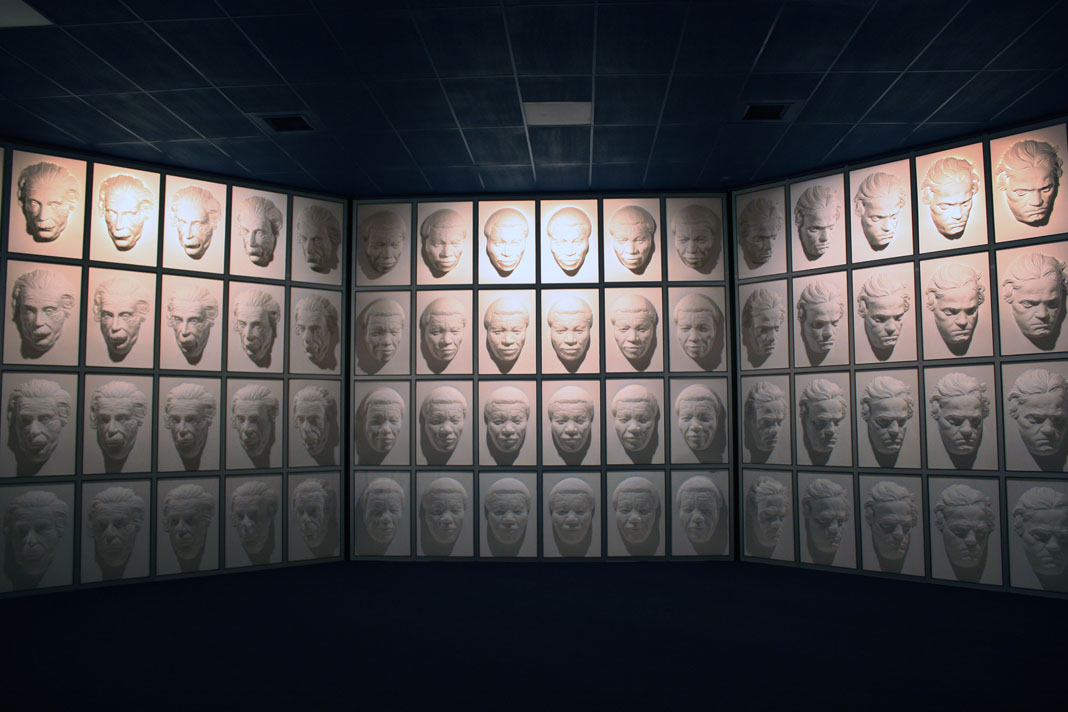
Following Faces Illusion Room

The Illusion Rooms include a set of rooms designed to absorb the visitor within its particular optical illusory theme. Aside from "The Sculpillusion Gallery" it contains The "Hologram Hall", a large range of holographic images, both traditional and new. The "Tilted House", built at a 15-degree angle, contains illusions such as water apparently flowing uphill, the octagonal "Hall of Following Faces" with back-lit hollow mask illusions on the walls, created by artist and sculptor Derek Ball, and an Ames Room, a perspectively confusing room with a delayed video feed where visitors can see themselves afterwards with seemingly different heights depending on where they were positioned.

=== 3D maze ===
Puzzling World features a large maze in which the traveller must reach four coloured corner towers before finding the middle courtyard (emergency doors are included for those who struggle).

== Psychic challenge ==
The operators of Puzzling World have for many years offered a monetary prize for anybody who can prove they have psychic powers; potential winners need to use their powers to locate a specific item located somewhere on the Puzzling World site. When the challenge began the prize was originally $50,000 NZD, for which any participant was required to find two halves of a promissory note which had been hidden within 5 kilometres (3.1 mi) of the building. This was then reduced to a radius of 200 metres (660 ft), and finally in 2006, when the prize was doubled to $100,000 NZD, 100 metres (330 ft). Any 'psychic' participant is required to pay $1000 to take part. For this they may sit in a room for 30 minutes with Stuart Landsborough seated behind a screen and ask questions while he visualises responses. The participant then has an hour to find the notes. To date the prize has not been claimed, although seven "professional" psychics have attempted the challenge, including a diviner and a man who prayed to locate them but failed to come back with an answer. In July 2022, the challenge officially ended.

== See also ==
- Illusion
- List of prizes for evidence of the paranormal
- Optical illusion
- South Island
- Tourism in New Zealand
