= Skeptik.ee =

Estonian skeptic-related website

Eesti Skeptic logo

skeptik.ee is the website and primary communication outlet of MTÜ Eesti Skeptik, a non-profit organisation established in 2007 and dedicated to the study of paranormal phenomena and claims, and coordination of communication between skeptics. It aims to popularize science among students and promote skeptical thought in Estonia.

== Research ==
In September 2007, skeptik.ee reported of a simple experiment analysing the visual qualities of electrolysis of various solutions of salts in water, trying to explain the apparent pollution of footbathwater caused by a product called Ionic-Detox. The elegant results and related conclusions regarding unnecessarily to insert polluted person's feet into footbath water to develop appearance of "extraction of pollutants from human body" has become the canonical study of "detoxification" footbath studies, commonly cited in discussions regarding this form of alternative health services.

== Abort.ee ==
In spring of 2008, the newly established Institute of Culture of Life (Estonian: Elukultuuri Instituut), a Catholic-connected anti-abortion organisation, set up abort.ee, a website supposedly "helping expectant mothers in pregnancy crisis to decide" but actually dedicated to convincing people about evils of abortion through photos of supposed remains of aborted fœtuses. skeptik.ee published several articles critical of the material and claims thereof, as well as the fact that EI had successfully applied for a grant for developing the website from Estonian Ministry of Social Affairs. EI responded by threatening to sue MTÜ Eesti Skeptik and Martin Vällik over defamation via mail and various public channels.

== Umbluu award ==
MTÜ Eesti Skeptik gives out a yearly Umbluu award, published every 31 April on the website, for the year's most striking activities in the field of propagating pseudoscience. The award comes with the sculpture of Skewed Pendulum (Estonian: Viltune Pendel).

In 2008, the award was given to Estonian Rescue Board for its procurement, continued usage and vocal defence of Sniffex, an extremely expensive dowsing rod. Notoriously, the Rescue Service was reported to have been using Sniffex for "bomb detection" during George W. Bush's state visit to Republic of Estonia.
