= Indian CSICOP =

Rationalist group

Logo of Indian CSICOP.

Indian CSICOP is a well-known rationalist group based at Podanur, Tamil Nadu, India. Founded by Basava Premanand (1930–2009). Indian CSICOP is in the forefront of the rationalist campaigns in India which attempt to expose perceived miracles and to eradicate superstitions.

Indian CSICOP is an affiliate of the US-based skeptical group CSICOP and it publishes Indian Skeptic, a rationalist periodical. It is also affiliated to the Federation of Indian Rationalist Associations, which is an apex body of about 65 rationalist, atheist and organizations aimed at popularization of science among laypersons. It is an associate member of International Humanist and Ethical Union based in London.

One of the main targets of criticism by the Indian Skeptic are the miracles and magic of the guru Sathya Sai Baba.
