= European Skeptics Podcast =

Skeptical podcast

The European Skeptics Podcast

Presentation
- Hosted by: András Gábor Pintér; Annika Harrison; Pontus Böckman
- Genre: Scientific skepticism
- Language: English
- Updates: Weekly

Production
- No. of episodes: 250

Publication
- Original release: 2015-11-18
- License: CC-BY-NC

The European Skeptics Podcast (TheESP) is a weekly podcast recorded in English and hosted by three skeptics from several different European countries: András Gábor Pintér from Hungary, Pontus Böckman from Sweden and Annika Harrison from Germany who joined the team in July 2020. The main goal of the podcast is to "support European level actions within the skeptical movement and build bridges among skeptics" all over the continent. The show is often jokingly referred to by other podcasters and people interviewed on the show as "the REAL ESP experience" referring to a namesake pseudoscientific concept.

The idea of launching a podcast with a clear European focus emerged at the European Council of Skeptical Organisations (ECSO) board meeting during the 16th European Skeptics Congress in London in September 2015. Although the show is independent, the first episode, aired on 18th November 2015, featured an interview with then ECSO chairman Gábor Hraskó and since then current chair of the organisation, Claire Kraulik-Klingenberg has also appeared on the podcast several times. In September 2017, two of the hosts (András G Pintér and Pontus Böckman) also became members of the board of directors of ECSO.

The podcast or its hosts have been featured on several podcasts of international acclaim, including Richard Saunders' The Skeptic Zone, Brian Dunning's Skeptoid, Kylie Sturgess' Token Skeptic podcast, the Canadian podcast The Reality Check and the CSI's webpage.

The show was awarded the 2017 Ockham's Award in the podcast category by The Skeptic magazine during QED conference in Manchester, UK.

== Hosts ==
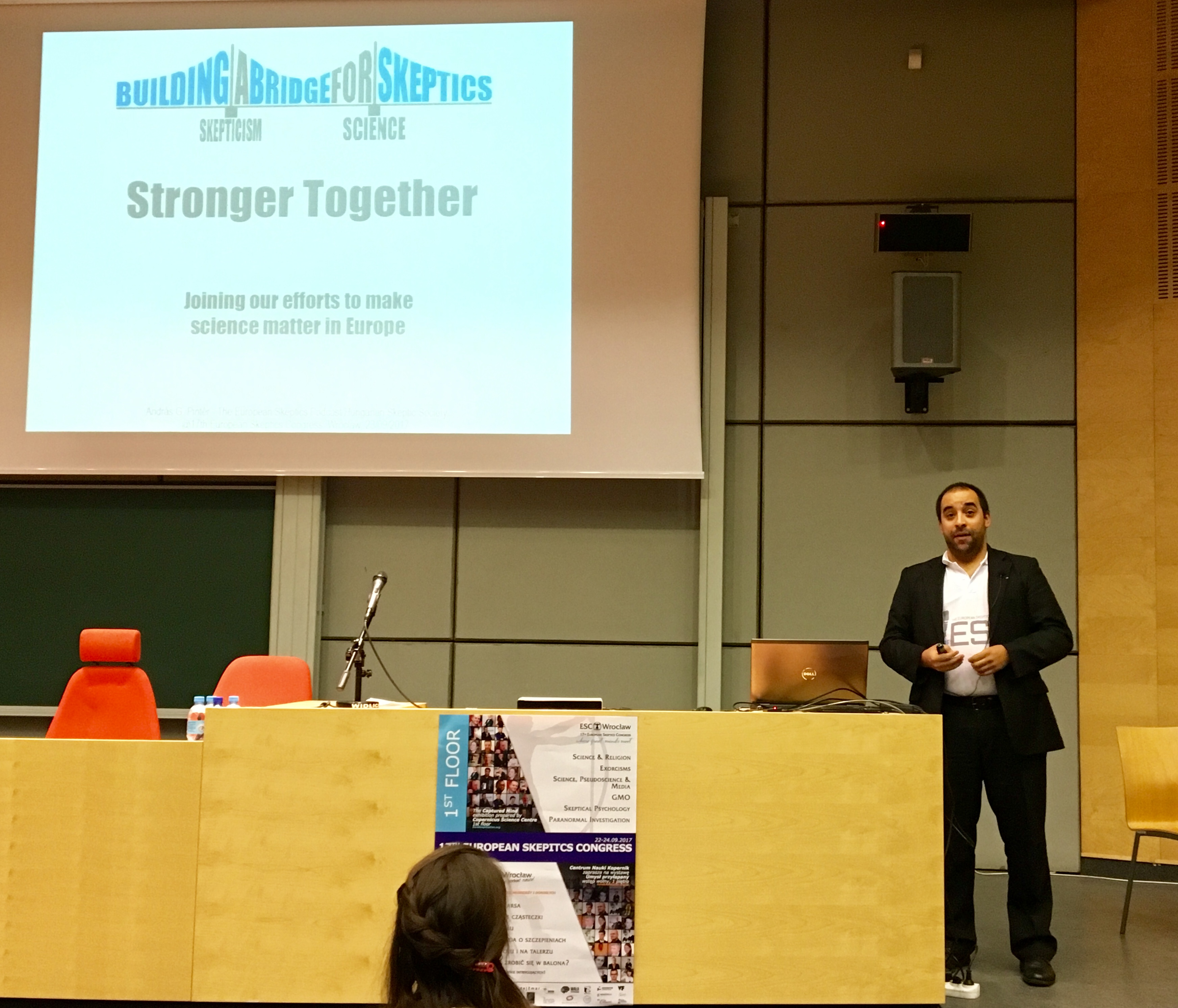
András Gábor Pintér during the 17th European Skeptics Congress in Wrocław, Poland

András Gábor Pintér is the initiator of the podcast. He is an original member and vice-president of the Hungarian Skeptic Society. In 1999 he received the James Randi Skeptic Award from the journal Természet Világa. In 2014 he joined, as one of the first members, Susan Gerbic's Guerrilla Skepticism on Wikipedia. In 2017 he was elected an associate member of the board of directors of ECSO and he is a full board member since 2019. He lived in Brighton, UK, until 2017.

Pontus Böckman is the president of the national Swedish Skeptics Society Föreningen Vetenskap och Folkbildning. In 2017 he was selected as a member of the board of directors of ECSO. He lives in Malmö, Sweden where he runs local Skeptics in the Pub events.

Annika Harrison is History and English teacher living in the Cologne area in Germany. She is also a member of the international Guerilla Skepticism on Wikipedia (GSoW) project and the local chapter of the German Skeptics organisation Gesellschaft zur wissenschaftlichen Untersuchung von Parawissenschaften (GWUP). She joined the team in July 2020, several months after Jelena Levin's departure from the show. In 2024, on episode #457, Annika said she was stepping down as a regular co-host. She expects however to make guest appearances on the podcast.

Jelena Levin from Latvia, who lived in the UK when the first episode aired, was one of the original hosts of the podcast, but having moved to the United States, she left the show after episode 227 in June 2020.

== Segments ==
The podcast is divided into several recurring segments, such as This Week in Skeptical History (TWISH), Skeptical News (news items about skepticism, mainly European centered), Really Wrong (or Really Right), Quote and an occasional interview with a person "representing an organisation or a project either of a certain European country or stretching across borders." The section Events in Europe about European skeptical organisations' events, was moved to the calendar on the podcast's webpage.

== See also ==
List of skeptical podcasts
