= Hungarian Skeptic Society =

Organization

Szkeptikus Társaság Hungarian Skeptic Society
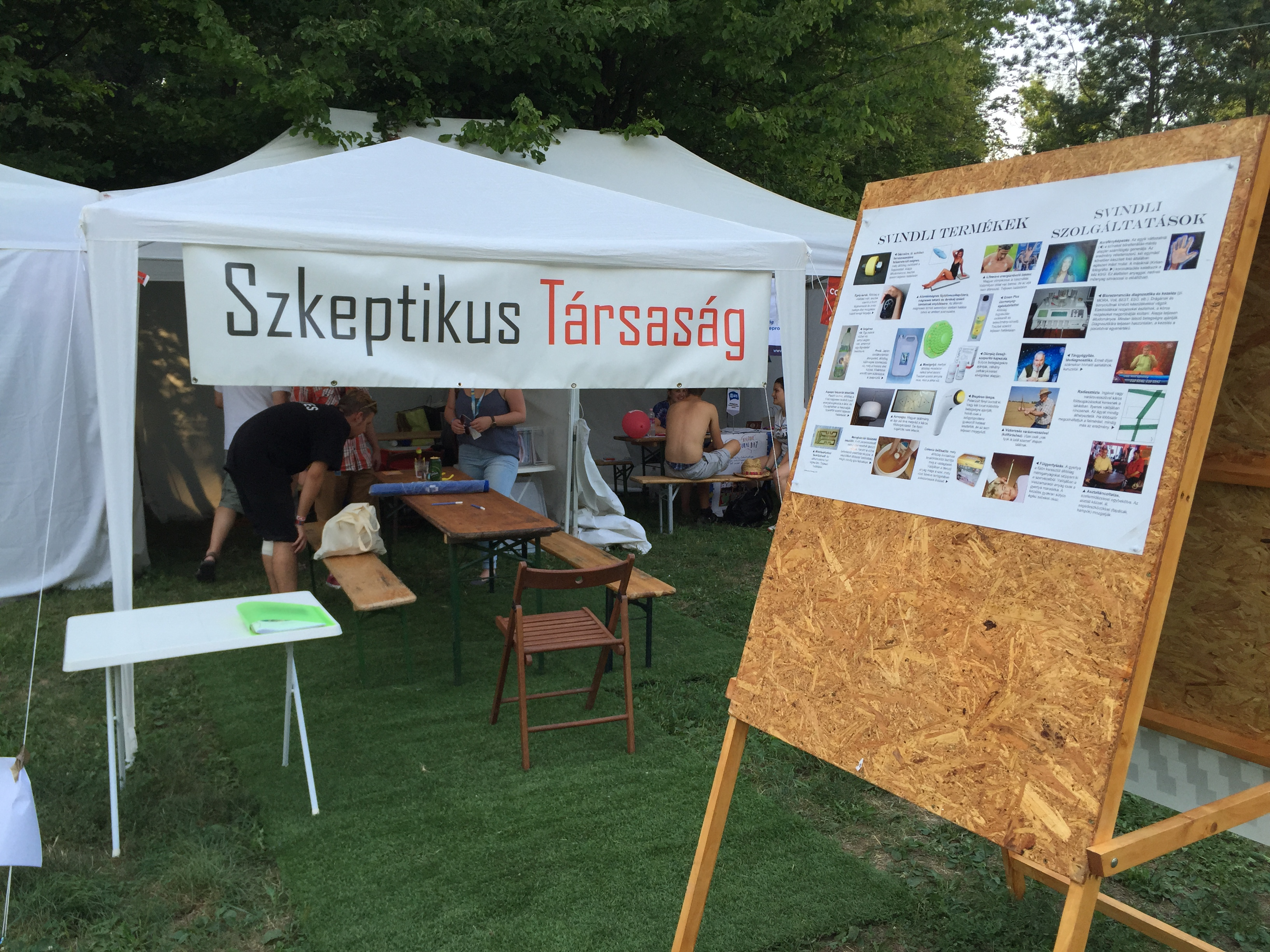
- Hungarian Skeptic Society at the Sziget Festival
- Abbreviation: HSS (English); SzT (Hungarian)
- Formation: December 2006
- Type: Nonprofit organisation
- Purpose: Development and support of the skeptic community
- Headquarters: Budapest
- Region served: Hungary
- President: Gábor Hraskó
- Website: www.szkeptikustarsasag.hu

The Hungarian Skeptic Society (HSS) (Hungarian: Szkeptikus Társaság Egyesület) is a skeptic organisation based in Hungary. Founded in 2006, it has been a member of the European Council of Skeptical Organisations (ECSO) since 2007. Its former president, Gábor Hraskó was also chairman of ECSO from 2013 to 2017. The current president, András Gábor Pintér who has been a board member of ECSO since 2017, is also the initiator, producer & co-host of the European Skeptics Podcast.

== History of skepticism in Hungary ==
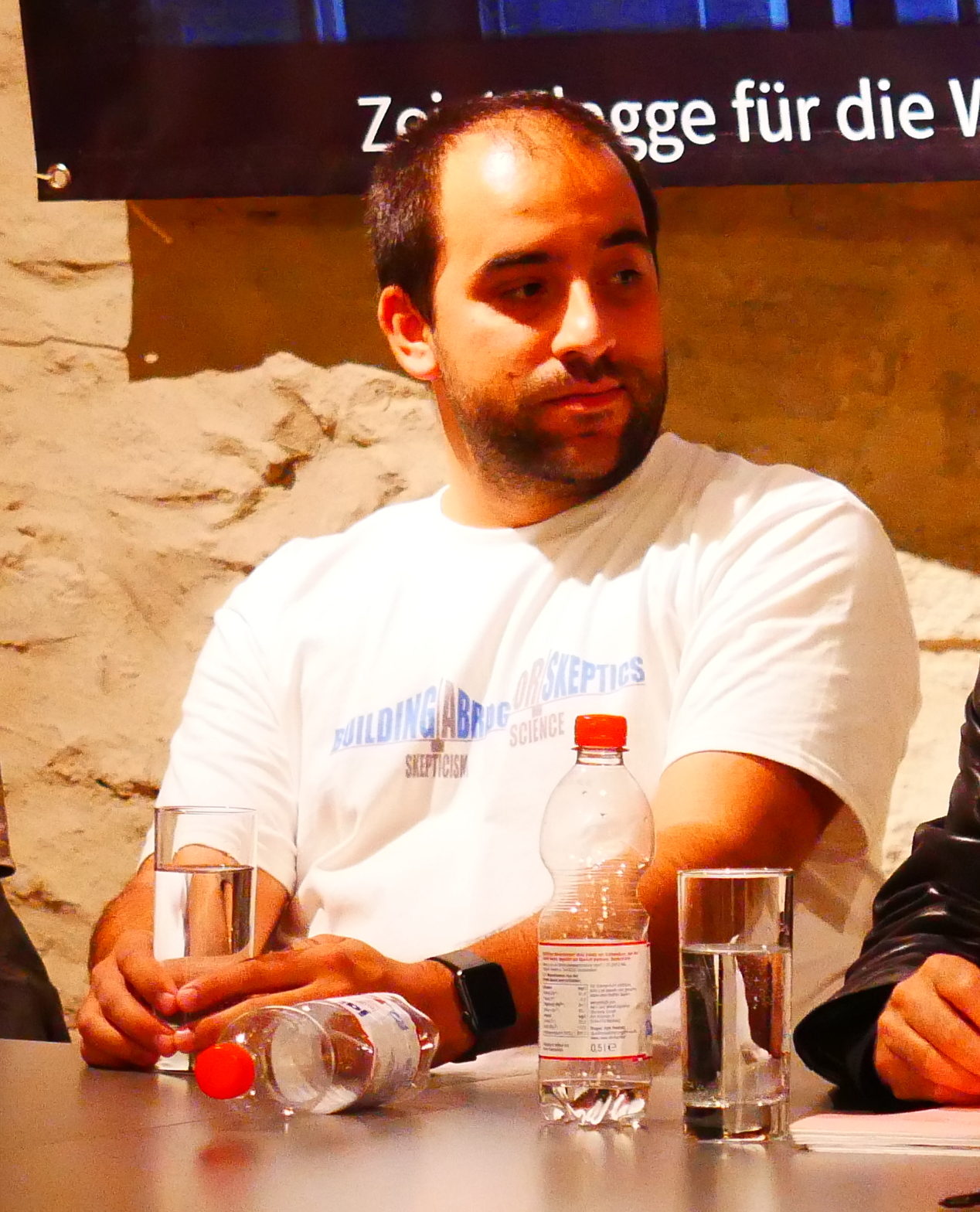
András G. Pintér, president of the Hungarian Skeptic Society

After the political changes in Hungary, pseudoscientific claims started to proliferate in the beginning of the 1990s. There was a group of scientists from the Hungarian Academy of Sciences, led by the late professor of anatomy János Szentágothai who, along with science writers at the journal Természet Világa (the World of Nature) and columnists of the time, who formed a group called Tényeket Tisztelők Társasága ("Society of the Respecters of Facts", also called 'Hungarian Skeptics'). However, this was not an officially existing body, only a fellowship of like-minded scholars and journalists, including internationally recognised SETI astronomer Iván Almár, TV host István Vágó and many others (i.e. professor of Chemistry Mihály Beck, professor of physiology György Ádám). Also, the approach of this group was fairly different from that seen in other skeptical organisations around Europe and the world, lacking grassroots activism and focusing on high-ranking scholars, expressing their opinion to a wider audience.

== Founding the Hungarian Skeptic Society ==
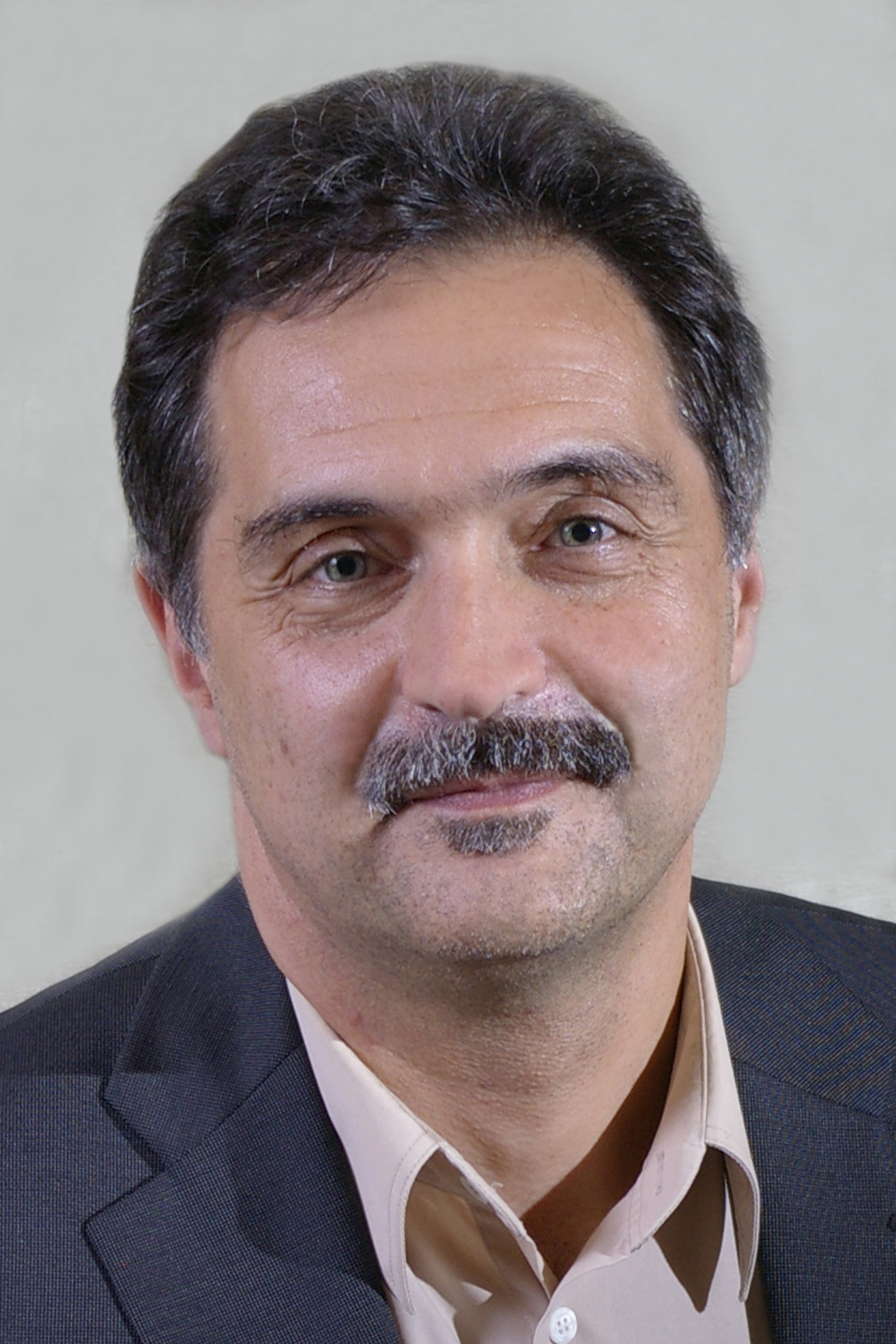
Gábor Hraskó, former president of the HSS

In the second half of 2006, skeptical activists, brought together by the annual Conference of Hungarian Skeptics in Székesfehérvár, teamed up with critically thinking individuals and small groups who had frequently shared their ideas on the internet or other channels. On 15 December 2006 the Hungarian Skeptic Society was founded with 19 participants. As of 2015, it has around 100 members from across Hungary. The Hungarian Skeptics originally began with the atheist movement, but they discovered that the two groups had different strategies, Hraskó explains that both are important, but the atheist group is more philosophical and has already reached the conclusion that God does not exist, no need to investigate. Whereas skeptics are more focused on the scientific method.

== Campaigns and activities ==
=== Online ===
The HSS has an intensive online presence with an official website, an official Facebook page that is rapidly growing in popularity, a discussion group with thousands of members, a blog and a podcast channel, along with a Twitter handle (@szkeptikus) and a YouTube channel.

=== Darwin Day ===
In 2007, the organisation launched a campaign to celebrate the life and achievements of Charles Darwin and the scientific importance of evolution and joined the international Darwin Day with a few local events and a website, that was later followed by a Facebook page.

=== Skeptic Club ===
Every month, lectures are held in the centre of Budapest, covering different topics ranging from philosophy to homeopathy and featuring many well-known experts on each individual field.

=== 14th European Skeptics Congress ===
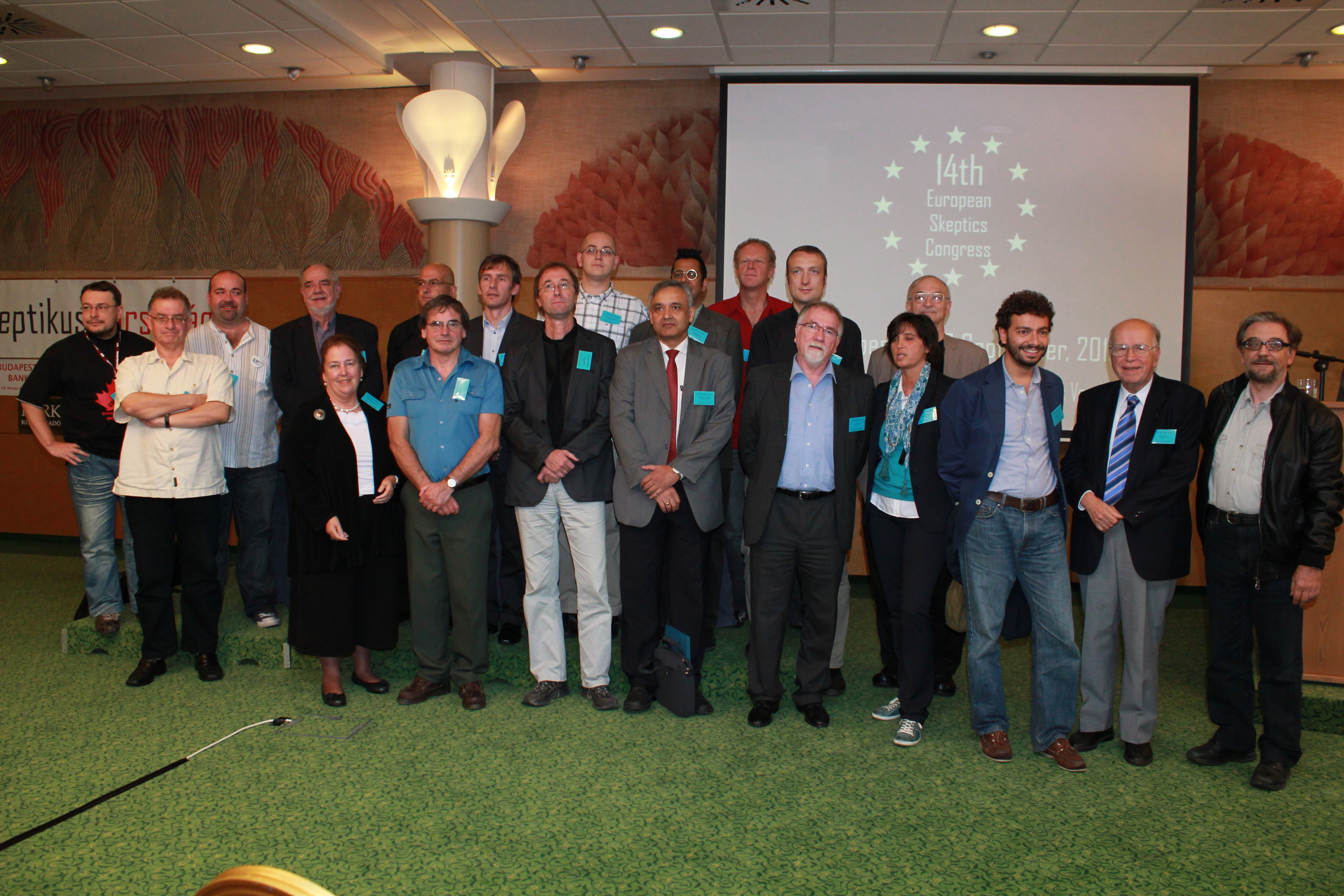
Speakers of the 14th European Skeptics Congress

Between 17 and 19 September 2010, the Hungarian Skeptic Society was granted the rights by the ECSO to organise and host the 14th European Skeptics Congress in Budapest. The 3-day conference, held in Hotel Flamenco in Buda, featured many internationally recognised skeptics, including Willem Betz from SKEPP, British psychologist Chris French, Michael Heap from ASKE, paranormal investigator Joe Nickell from CSI, Massimo Polidoro from CICAP in Italy, Andy Wilson from the Merseyside Skeptics Society and science writer Simon Singh along with several Hungarian skeptics (recognised astronomer Iván Almár from SETI, TV host István Vágó, computational scientist George Kampis, physicist Gábor Szabó and linguist Klára Sándor).

=== "10^{23} Homeopathy - There's Nothing in It" campaign ===
Homeopathic "overdose" by members of the Hungarian Skeptic Society in Szeged with then vice president Ernő Duda (left) and current vice president János Györgyey (middle), 5 February 2011

In 2011 the HSS joined the 10:23 Campaign, a worldwide challenge to raise awareness about the ineffectiveness of homeopathic remedies and the implausibility of the mechanisms they claim to work in the background of it. As part of the campaign, members and supporters of the organisation executed a homeopathic overdose in 3 Hungarian cities: Budapest, Székesfehérvár, Szeged, As part of the campaign, a "Hungarian 10:23 Homeopathy - There's nothing in it" webpage and a Facebook page was launched as well.

== Board members ==
- András G. Pintér - president
- Dániel Péterfi - managing director
- Laura Csécsi - vice president
- János Györgyey - vice president
