= Eduardo Angulo =

Eduardo Angulo can refer to:

- Eduardo Angulo (footballer) (born 1953), Bolivian footballer
- Eduardo Angulo (writer) (born 1958), Spanish writer and professor
