= Gábor Hraskó =

Hungarian science writer (born 1963)

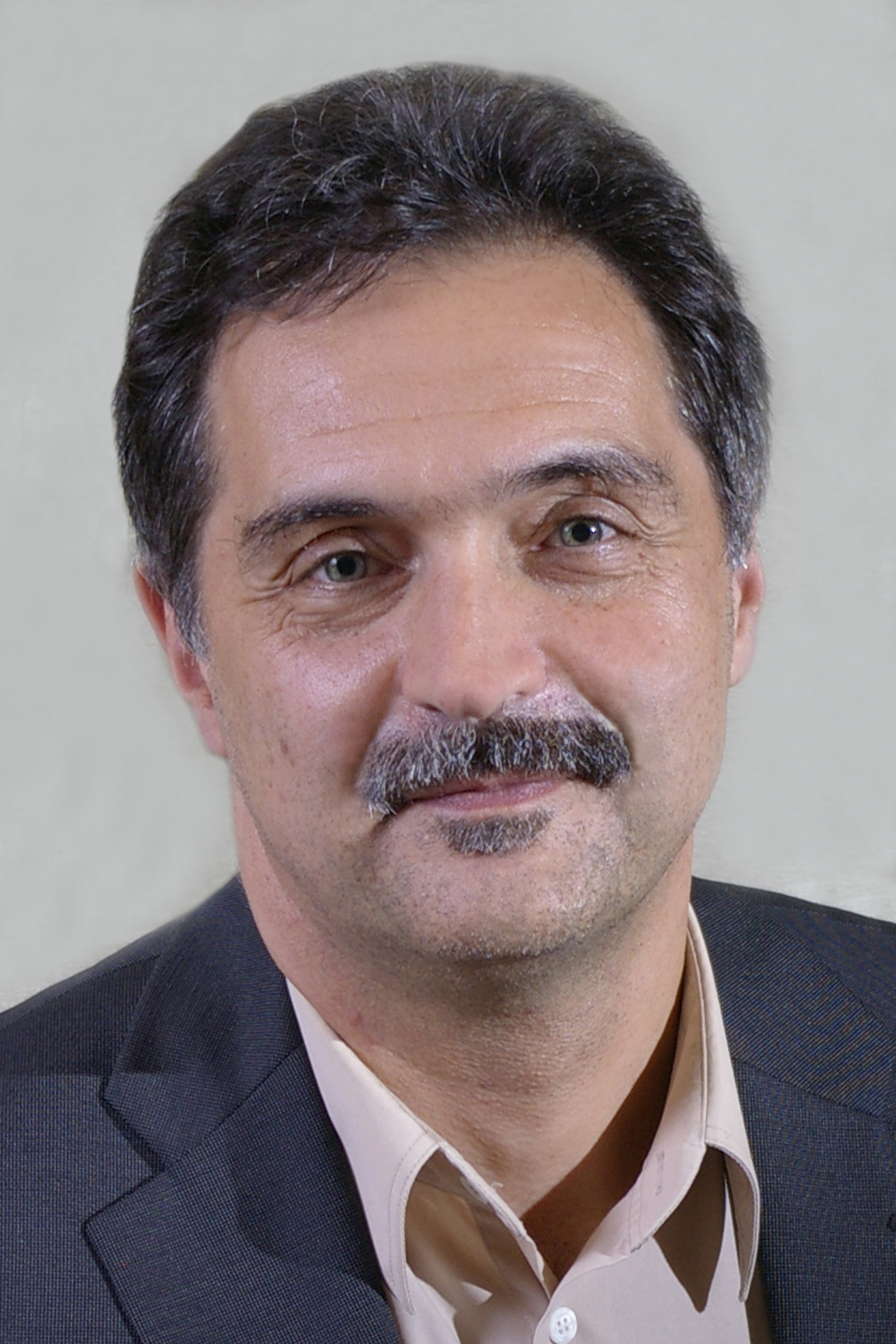
- Gábor Hraskó at the 14th European Skeptics Congress in Budapest 2010
- Born: 26 August 1963 (age 62); Budapest
- Education: Biologist (MSc)
- Occupation: IT product manager
- Website: xaknak.hrasko.com

Gábor Hraskó (born 26 August 1963) is a Hungarian science communicator and skeptic, well known within the Hungarian and international movement as the president of the Hungarian Skeptic Society and chairman of the European Council of Skeptical Organisations (2013-2017). He is a member of the Club of Hungarian Science Journalists, author of the "X-Aknák" popular science blog, and was co-editor and co-host of the television series of the same name. Hraskó is a scientific and technical consultant for the Committee for Skeptical Inquiry.

== Personal life and education ==
He's the oldest son of Péter Hraskó, renowned physicist, recognised for his research and teaching activities on the field of relativity.

Following his high school graduation in 1981, he went on to study biology at the Eötvös Loránd University, where he finished his studies with a Research master's degree in 1987. After that he worked as a biologist at the Zoology Department of the Hungarian Natural History Museum until 1989, when he moved on to the field of IT.

== Career as a skeptic ==
=== Science educator ===
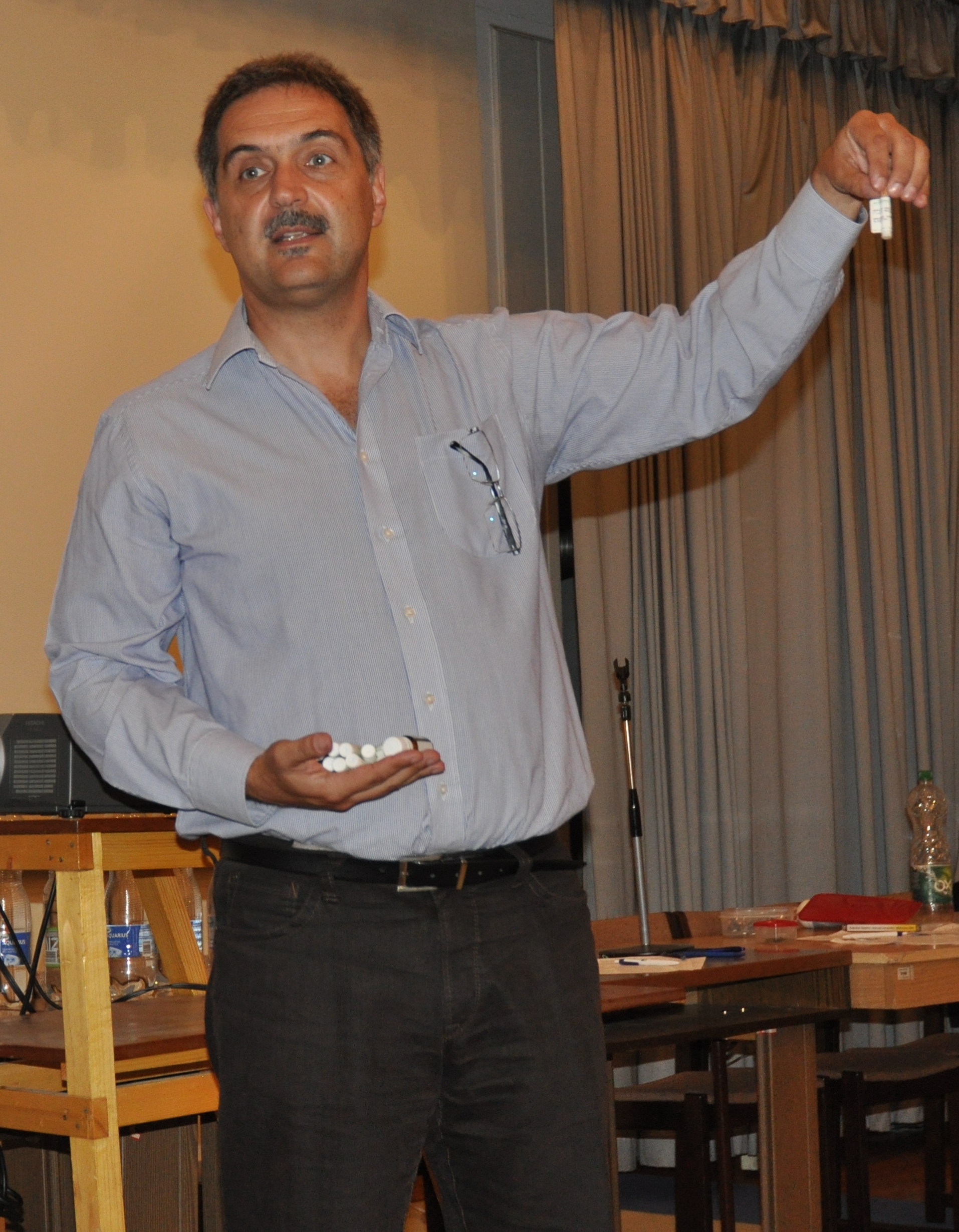
Gábor Hraskó giving a talk on homeopathy at an event organised by the Hungarian Skeptic Society in 2012

His first science education writings were published in 1999 in the Hungarian journal Természet Világa, in a special column that lasted 3 issues and was given the title Szkeptikus Sarok (translates as 'Skeptical Corner'). This was followed by several other articles, but in 2001 he started his own skeptical blog with the title X-Aknák (translates to 'X-Mines', with reference to the then very popular series, the X-Files).

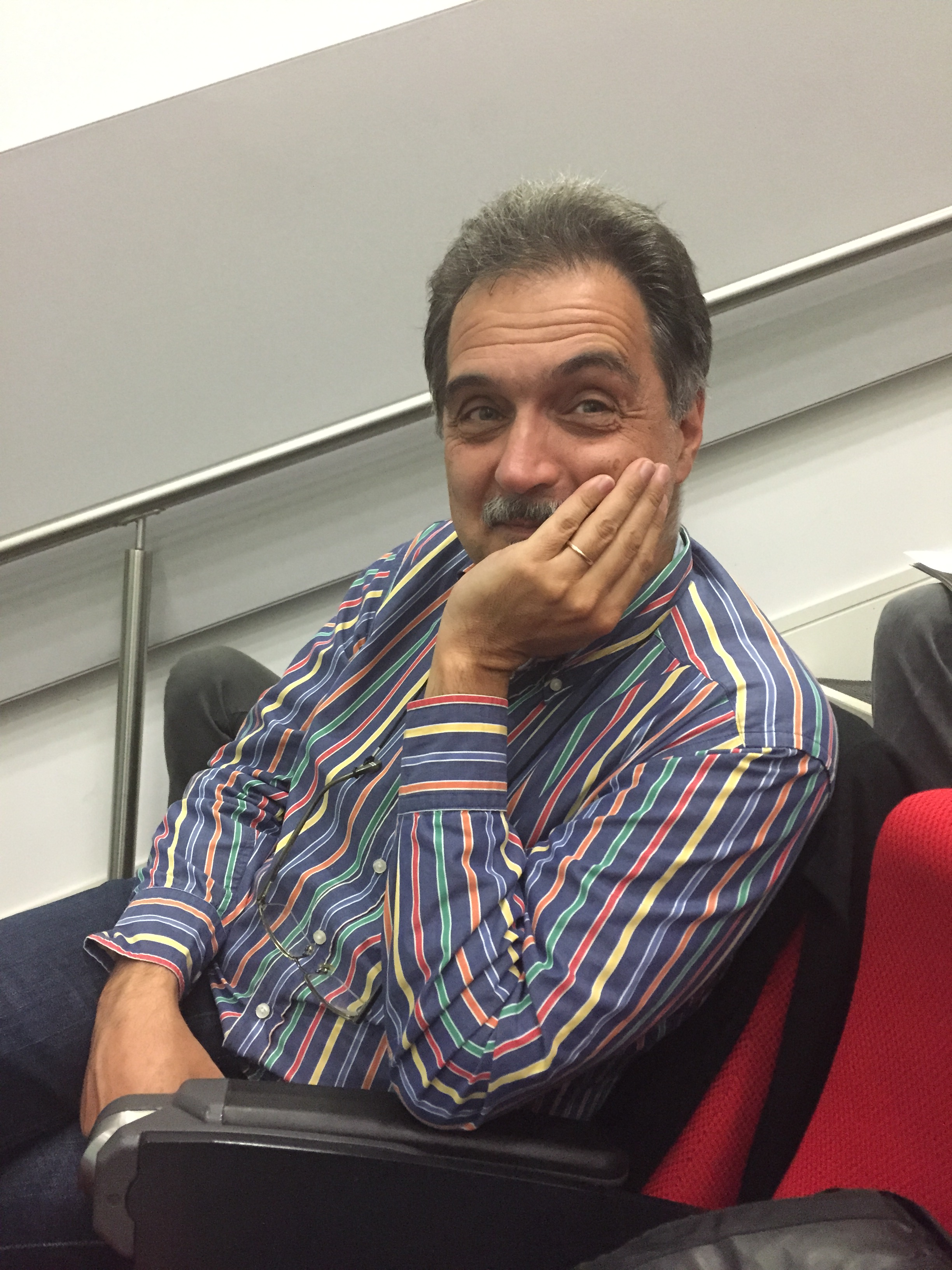
Gábor Hraskó at the 16th European Skeptics Congress in London

In 2003 the same title was used for a TV series he co-edited and co-hosted with the Hungarian quiz show host and fellow skeptic István Vágó. The show featured lively debates with proponents of pseudoscientific claims and lasted only 11 episodes before it was shut down by the channel (ATV), claiming there had been violent reactions from debated pseudoscientists and negative feedback from viewers.

=== Skeptical activist ===
After the political changes in Hungary in 1990, many different claims of a pseudoscientific nature started to emerge in the country. To provide an organised force against pseudoscience, a group called Tényeket Tisztelők Társasága ("Society of the Respecters of Facts", also called 'Hungarian Skeptics') was brought to life in 1992. Although this was not an officially existing body, Gábor Hraskó became a board member and secretary, but after it became obvious that the purely academic style in the skeptic movement was not efficient, he and István Vágó started the preparations to establish an officially existing organisation to coordinate grassroots activism.

The future of scientific skepticism is improving, according to Hraskó, as popular movies are shifting away from scientists being the "bad guys" and more movies such as The Martian, Interstellar and Gravity are making the heroes scientists. These movies are featuring good scientific content but still appeal to audiences not normally interested in science. This is a "great influence" and helping to change views on science. In order to facilitate a love of science, according to Hraskó, we need to tell good stories, "not to trap... but to explain... people are not rational animals... we have to teach them to become so". When asked what advice he would give someone interested in getting involved in the skeptical movement, he said, "You do not have to be a scientist or expert on a subject... you will learn as you go".

It's not just that we have to debunk things, we have to teach people how to think scientifically.

=== Role in the Hungarian skeptic movement ===
In December 2006, the Hungarian Skeptic Society (HSS) was founded, with István Vágó elected president and Gábor Hraskó to become vice president of the organisation. Then he went on to become COO in 2008 and president in 2009, a position he holds to date.

The Hungarian Skeptics originally began with the atheist movement, but they discovered that the two groups had different strategies, Hraskó explains that both are important, but the atheist group is more philosophical and has already reached the conclusion that God does not exist, no need to investigate. Whereas skeptics are more focused on the scientific method. As of the fall of 2015, there are 100 members of the Hungarian skeptic group.

=== Role in the European skeptic movement ===
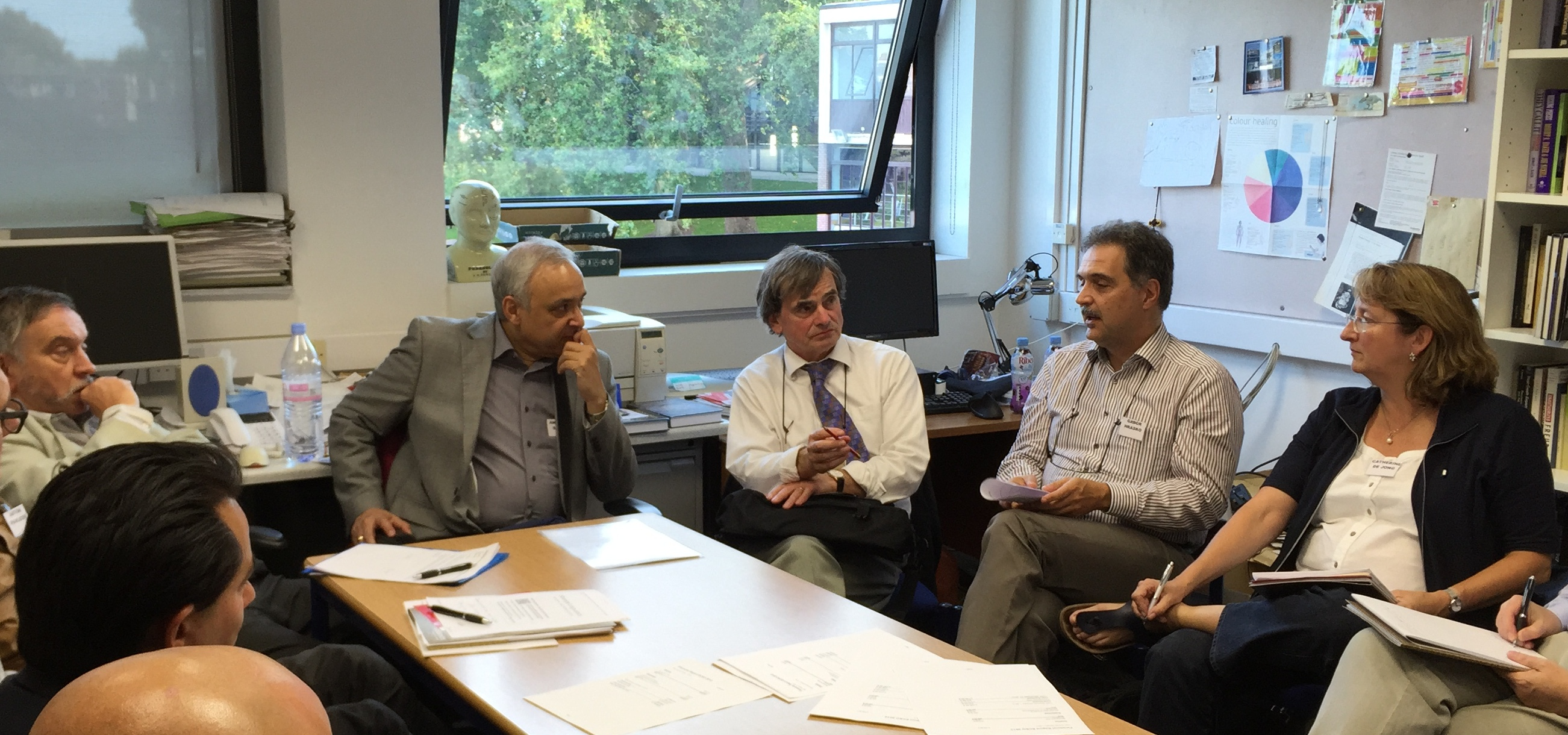
The board of ECSO holding a meeting in London at the 16th European Skeptics Congress in 2015 (left to right): Tim Trachet, Amardeo Sarma, Michael Heap, Gábor Hraskó and Catherine de Jong

After the HSS had joined the European Council of Skeptical Organisations (ECSO) in 2007, he acted as a chief organiser of the 14th European Skeptics Congress held in Budapest in 2010, hosted by the Hungarian Skeptics. He became vice chairman of the ECSO, then in 2013 he was elected chairman of the organisation at the 15th European Skeptics Congress in Stockholm. There he remained until the end of the 17th European Skeptics Congress, when he left the role and was replaced by Claire Klingenberg.

In recent years, he has been attending skeptic meetings across Europe as well as still playing a leading role in the Hungarian movement at large.

When asked what the biggest challenges are for Hungary and Europe, Hraskó explained that when they started out in the early 1990s the focus was on UFOs and Astrology. Now the focus has changed to alt med and health scares, also more scientific centered topics like GMO's and global warming are becoming more important.

=== Other appearances ===
At the 17th European Skeptics Congress, he chaired a panel on science and religion. Joining him on the panel were Konrad Talmont-Kamiński, Gerald Ostdiek, Petr Jan Vinš, and Leo Igwe.

== Public life ==
He was active in the international green movement at the end of the 80s and beginning of the 90s and was a founding member of the Green Party of Hungary, within which he was responsible for international relations from 1989. It was in this period, when he was chief organiser of the first Eastern European meeting of European Greens in Budapest in 1990. He was also one of the leading members of the GreenWay movement as editor of their newsletter.

== Personal life ==
Gábor Hraskó is an experienced hiker and an ardent birdwatcher, and also has a passion for flying, something he tries to satisfy with self-education through flight simulators. Asked about his partaking in the 10:23 Campaign in 2010, he said "I am a five-year survivor". Hraskó is married and has two daughters.
