= Ernő Duda =

Hungarian entrepreneur (born 1968)

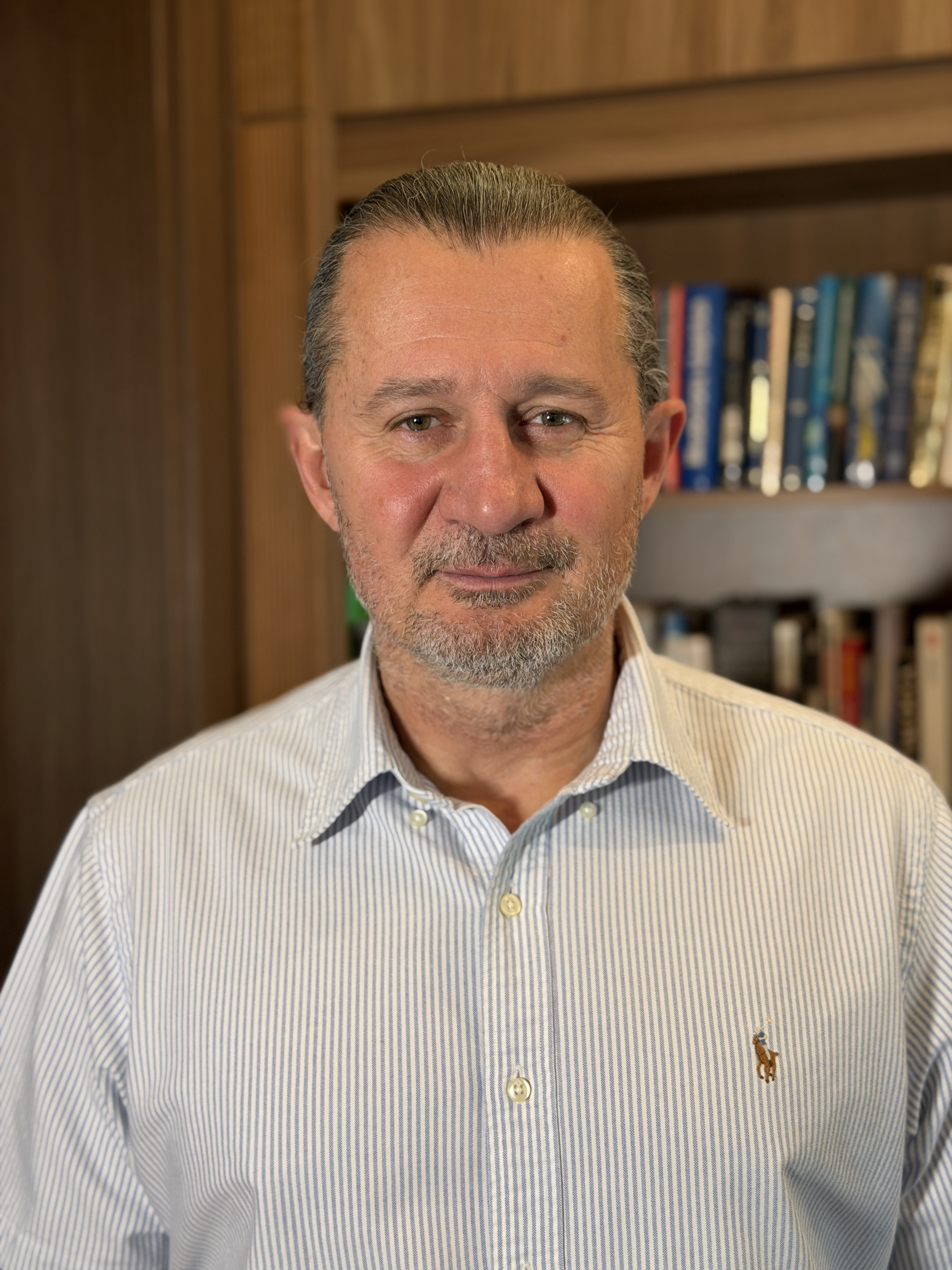
- Born: August 27, 1968 (age 58); Budapest, Hungary
- Education: University of Szeged; The Open University
- Occupation: IT/Biotech executive
- Organization(s): Hungarian Biotechnology Association, Hungarian Skeptic Society
- Website: Hungarianbiotech.org

Ernő Duda Jr. (born 27 August 1968) is a Hungarian entrepreneur, a prominent figure of the country's innovation and startup ecosystem, with the introduction of several well known brands into Hungary linked to his name, including the local branch of Copy General and the largest online store of second hand books, Antikvarium.hu.

His most successful business venture is the founding of Solvo Biotechnology, a company that has since developed into a leading provider of drug membrane transport services and products.

He is also the founder and President of the Hungarian Biotechnology Association, associate professor at the University of Szeged, co-founder of Szikra School, as well as a member and former vice-president of the Hungarian Skeptic Society. He teaches at several Hungarian higher education institutions and with four talks to date he is the country's speaker with the highest number of appearances at TEDx conferences.

== Personal life and education ==
He was born in Budapest, Hungary in 1968 to molecular biologist Ernő Duda, and neurochemist Anna Borsodi. He graduated high school in 1986 at Miklós Radnóti High School, after which he initially intended to pursue a career in scientific research. He had wanted to study Biology, but ended up enrolling on a Chemistry course at the Attila József University (currently called University of Szeged), but after two years, he dropped out because of a personal conflict with a professor.

Not long after that he got acquainted with American businessman, Paul Panitz and the two ended up as partners in the founding of the Hungarian branch of Copy General, a major provider of printing services all over the country for more than a decade. In the following years he took part in the launching and leading of several business ventures. In the meantime he also enrolled on a management course at The Open University where he graduated at the early 2000s, followed by a leadership course at the Singularity University, but he also took part in the "2016 Boston Edition of the European Entrepreneurship Colloquium", a joint programme of Harvard University and Massachusetts Institute of Technology.

His wife is an MD and they have 6 children. Sports play an important role in his life, the dominant activities being volleyball and cycling.

== Business career ==
During his business career spanning 30 years, he has been involved in the founding of close to two dozen companies, either directly or through one of the two business incubators he is a partner in. He was there at the launch of Copy General Hungary and Antikvarium.hu, with his main responsibility in the latter being the IT development of the store.

Between 1996 and 1999 Duda was the CEO of a corporate finance accountancy company, LP Invest, and in 1999 he founded Solvo Biotechnology, which is his most successful business venture so far, as he has developed it into a company of international acclaim. From a small startup of 3 people it has grown into a firm that has 200 employees in Szeged and Budapest and is a market leader in research and development in the field of pharmaceutical membrane transport solutions. Solvo was acquired by Citoxlab, a French CRO in 2018, which was further acquired by Charles River Laboratories in 2019, with Ernő Duda remaining the CEO of the company he had created.

Duda was one of the founders of Medipredict, a company launched in 2015 that provides complex disease prediction and prevention solutions for individuals, based on comprehensive examinations with the use of state-of-the-art diagnostic tools.

In 2016, he was a co-founder of Aquincum Technology Incubator, the main goal of which is to help start-ups develop into successful companies, ready for the challenging international markets as well as potential future investments.

== Further activities ==
=== Public speaker ===
Science and innovation have always played an important role in his life, with a special focus on the intersection of life sciences and information technology. He is a regular speaker at public events, including TEDxDanubia and TEDxSzeged, where he has given talks on healthcare and education related issues. With four appearances overall, he is the person with the highest number of talks in the history of TEDx in Hungary.

=== Teacher in higher education ===
As an associate professor, Duda teaches courses on the business applications of biotechnology at the University of Szeged, but he gives university lectures in other institutions as well, including the University of Debrecen, the University of Pécs, the Budapest University of Technology and Economics, Corvinus University of Budapest and Semmelweis University, both in Hungarian and English. He also provides leadership and entrepreneurship courses at the Aquincum Institute of Technology.

=== Skeptic ===
Duda has played an active role in the fight against pseudoscience and quackery in Hungary. He was one of the participants of the Hungarian actions on 5 February 2011 as part of the global "1023 Homeopathy - Nothing in it" campaign, when activist attempted to 'overdose' on homeopathic products. He is also one of the members of the Hungarian Skeptic Society, to which he served as vice president until June 2013.

=== School founder ===
He has been a long-time advocate of education reform, claiming that schools should focus on preparing children for an unforeseeable future, thus the main focus should be adaptability and life-long learning. In 2020 he was one of the initiators of Szikra Foundation, the organisation that launched the homonymous school that started out as an elementary school, but since has been functioning as a high school as well.

=== Disseminator of science ===
During the COVID-19 pandemic he was often featured on television and in print as an expert when it came to topics like the development of vaccines. He has been an advocate for vaccinations, reminding everyone of the advantages of being immunized.

== Awards and recognitions ==
- In 2004 Solvo Biotechnology was awarded the Hungarian Grand Prize of Innovation by the Hungarian Innovation Association for their ABC transporter test array product family that they developed.
- In 2012 he was awarded the Dénes Gábor Prize "for his outstanding professional, public and managerial activities for the development of domestic biotechnology, the creation and successful management of several market-leading creative and innovative enterprises, for his decisive management role in the establishment, development and operation of a European biotechnology company that creates jobs and is a global market leader, and for his work in organizing successful innovation."
