= Föreningen Vetenskap och Folkbildning =

Organization based in Sweden

Vetenskap och Folkbildning
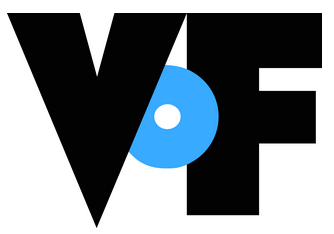
- Abbreviation: VoF
- Formation: 1982
- Type: Nonprofit organisation
- Purpose: Raise public awareness of scientific methods and results; combat inaccurate views on issues that can be resolved scientifically
- Headquarters: Stockholm
- Region served: Sweden
- Members: 2800
- Chairperson: Pontus Böckman
- Website: www.vof.se

Vetenskap och Folkbildning (Swedish: literal translation "Science and Popular Enlightenment", English: The Swedish Skeptics' Association), abbreviated as VoF, is a Swedish skeptics' association. It was founded in 1982 to raise the general public's awareness of scientific methods and results. The association publishes the quarterly journal Folkvett and organises lectures on themes related to science and pseudoscience. Since 1987 the association has annually awarded prizes for "Enlightener of the Year" and "Misleader of the Year".

== Activities ==
In 2010 the association had over 2600 members. The current chairman is Pontus Böckman (who is also a co-host of The European Skeptics Podcast and a board member of the European Council of Skeptical Organisations), while Lina Hedman acts as vice-president. Other prominent members are professor of philosophy Sven Ove Hansson (chairman 1982–1988), professor of molecular cell biology Dan Larhammar (chairman 1998–2004) and ESA astronaut Christer Fuglesang.

VoF is part of an international network of skeptics' associations, the largest of which is the American Committee for Skeptical Inquiry (CSI). Founded six years prior to VoF, CSI served as a model for the Swedish organisation.

== Criticism ==
People whose activities has been labeled "pseudoscience" and "deceptions" by VoF, and by skeptics in general, have been critical of the organisation.

In academia the association enjoys quite high esteem. Several Swedish universities offer courses utilising publications by its members. Many members are scientists and teachers.

Some criticism has however also been voiced by academics. Philosopher Martin Gustafsson at the Stockholm University argues that VoF exaggerates the threats against rationality and science, and that its representatives erroneously depict themselves as underdogs in a war on widespread superstition. He has also maintained that the Enlightenment's ideal of free thought clashes with the respect for scientific authority that VoF espouses. Per-Anders Forstorp at the Royal Institute of Technology in Stockholm, suggests that VoF represents positivism and institutionalised intolerance.

Sven Ove Hansson has commented on this kind of criticism:

The way I see it, VoF and the general skeptical movement is not characterised by any particular view of science. ... Just like members of Amnesty International can have different ideas about the limits of free speech, there is room in VoF for divergent opinions in questions about science and the philosophy of science. (Critics have sometimes claimed that the organisation is full of positivists. I have never come across one of those, but VoF does have supporters and opponents of Karl Popper's falsificationist theory of science among its members.)
