= Eduardo Angulo (writer) =

Spanish writer and cellular biology professor

Eduardo Angulo Pinedo (born Bilbao, 1958; died Bilbao, December 5, 2024) was a Spanish writer and professor of cellular biology at the Universidad del País Vasco. He has published widely in scientific journals and other academic publications; he was also a contributor to the Enciclopedia Durvan. He was a member of the Círculo Escéptico, and maintains a biology blog on the online edition of El Correo de Bilbao. Among his books are El animal que cocina. Gastronomía para homínidos (2009), Monstruos. Una visión científica de la Criptozoología (2007), and Julio Verne y la cocina. La vuelta al mundo en 80 recetas (2005).
