= Círculo Escéptico =

Spanish rationalist nonprofit organisation

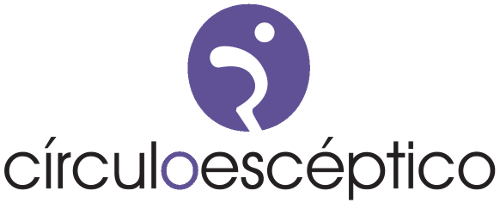
- Formation: 2006
- Type: Nonprofit organisation
- Purpose: Scientifically challenging paranormal claims, pseudoscience and superstition
- Region served: Spain
- Website: circuloesceptico.org

The Círculo Escéptico (English: Skeptical Circle) is a Spanish rationalist nonprofit organisation, which seeks to scientifically question paranormal claims, pseudoscience and superstition, favouring critical thinking and scientific skepticism.

The Círculo Escéptico was founded in 2006 and is a member of the European Council of Skeptical Organisations (ECSO). It is one of the two major skeptical organisations in the country, the other being ARP-SAPC.

Círculo Escéptico hosts several Skeptics in the Pub (Escépticos en el Pub) events in Spain. It annually awards a Journalism and Critical Thinking Prize to whoever has encouraged critical thinking and scientific skepticism in the Spanish media the most. In 2016, the first prize was awarded posthumously to José Carlos Pérez Cobo.

== See also ==
- 10:23 Campaign
- Scientific method
