= European Council of Skeptical Organisations =

Umbrella of skeptical organizations in Europe

- Abbreviation: ECSO
- Formation: 1994; 32 years ago
- Type: Nonprofit organisation
- Legal status: Eingetragener Verein registered in Darmstadt
- Purpose: Co-ordination between European organisations and individuals that promote scientific skepticism
- Headquarters: Roßdorf, Germany
- Region served: Europe
- President: Pontus Böckman
- Website: ecso.org

The European Council of Skeptical Organisations (ECSO) is an umbrella of organisations defending scientific skepticism in Europe.

== Goals ==
Founded on 25 September 1994, the ECSO aims to co-ordinate activities of European organisations and individuals that aim at critically investigating pseudoscientific statements and claims regarding observations of paranormal phenomena, and to make the results of its investigations known to the broad public. It means to continue the series of European skeptical congresses that preceded its foundation and supports a biennial congress and a symposium every other year.

The Charter of the European Council of Skeptical Organisations states that it strives

1) To protect the public from the promulgation of claims and therapies which have not been subjected to critical testing and thus might pose a danger to them.
2) To investigate by means of controlled tests and experiments such extraordinary claims which are on the fringe of or contradict current scientific knowledge. In particular this applies to phenomena commonly identified as "paranormal" or "pseudoscientific". However no claims, explanations or theories will be rejected in advance of objective evaluation.
3) To promote public policy based on good practice in science and medicine.

The Charter was signed by Amardeo Sarma (GWUP), Michael Howgate (UK Skeptics), Miguel Angel Sabadell (ARP), Paul Kurtz (CSICOP), Tim Trachet (SKEPP), Arlette Fougnies (Comité Para) and Cornelis de Jager (Stichting Skepsis).

== Structure ==
=== Board of directors ===
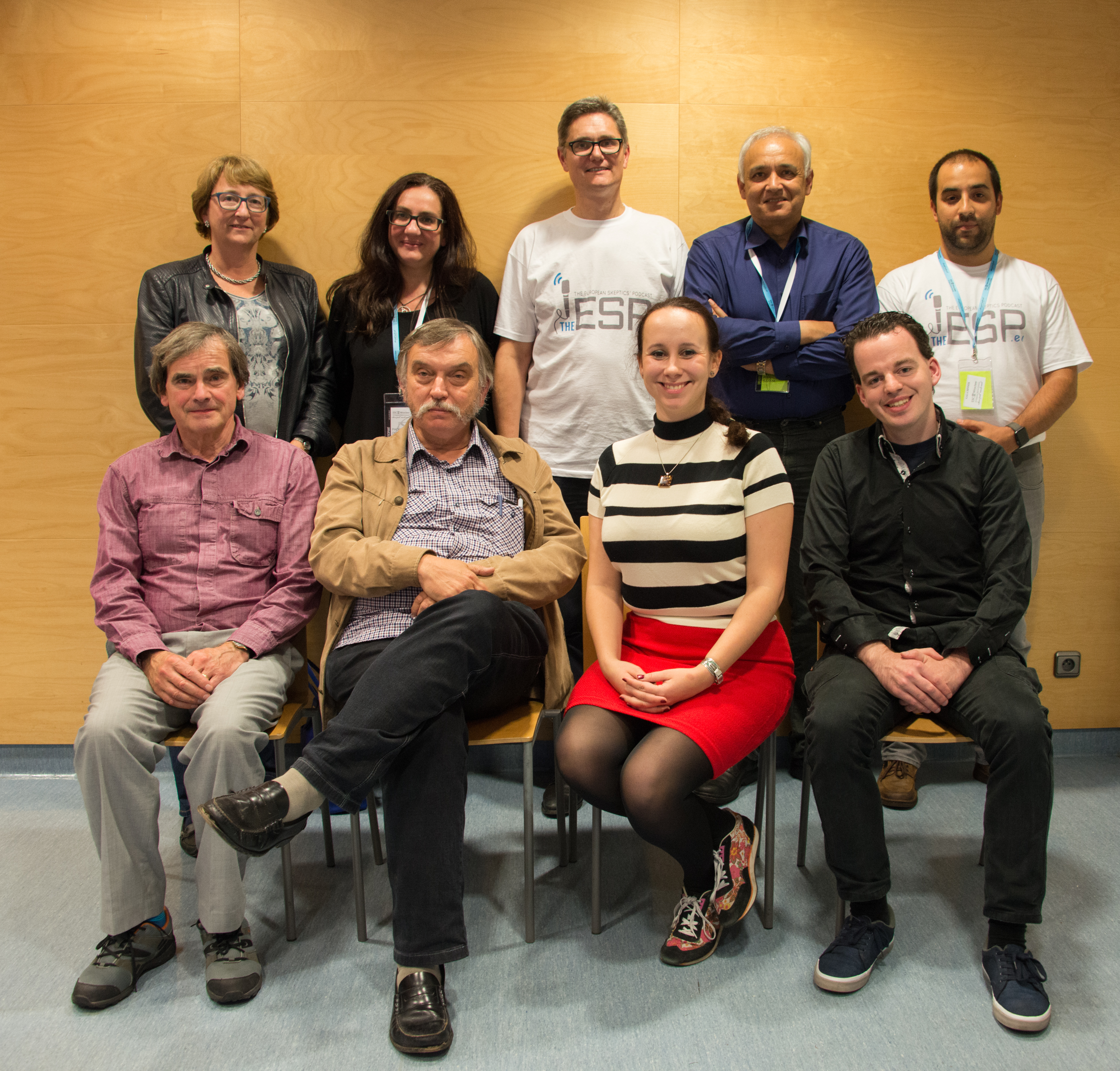
The board gathered in Wrocław at ESC 2017. Back: de Jong, De Gobbi, Böckman, Sarma, Pintér. Front: Heap, Trachet, Klingenberg, Korteweg.

Cornelis de Jager served as first president until 2001, when he was replaced by Amardeo Sarma (2001–2013), who in turn was succeeded by Gábor Hraskó (2013–2017). Since 2017 the president has been Claire Klingenberg. As of June 2024, the ECSO board is composed as follows:

- Pontus Böckman (VoF) – President
- Catherine de Jong (VtdK) – Vice-President
- Amardeo Sarma (GWUP) – Vice-President
- Paola De Gobbi (CICAP) – Member
- Michael Heap (ASKE) – Member
- András Gábor Pintér (SzT) – Member
- Jean-Luc Bernet (CZLR) – Member
- Tim Trachet (SKEPP) – Member
- Patricia Fechet (The Secular-Humanist Association of Romania (ASUR)) – Member
- Alice Howarth (Merseyside Skeptics Society (MSS)) – Member
- Marianne Rodot (Association française pour l'information scientifique – (AFIS))

=== Member organisations ===
The ECSO brings together the following skeptic groups:

Local name	English name	Abbrev.	Founded	Region served	Notes
Alternativa Racional a las Pseudociencias – Sociedad para el Avance del Pensamiento Crítico	Rational Alternative to Pseudoscience – Society for the Advancement of Critical Thinking	ARP-SAPC	1986	Spain	Founding member.
Association for Skeptical Enquiry	Association for Skeptical Enquiry	ASKE	1997	United Kingdom	
Association française pour l'information scientifique	French Association for Scientific Information	AFIS	1968	France	Member since 2001.
Comitato Italiano per il Controllo delle Affermazioni sulle Pseudoscienze	Italian Committee for the Investigation of Claims of the Pseudosciences	CICAP	1989	Italy	
Comité belge pour l'Analyse Critique des parasciences	Belgian Committee for the Critical Analysis of Parasciences	Comité Para	1949	Belgium	Serves Wallonia and Brussels. Founding member.
Círculo Escéptico	Skeptical Circle	CE	2006	Spain	
Föreningen Vetenskap och Folkbildning	Science and Popular Enlightenment / Swedish Skeptics Association	VoF	1982	Sweden	
Gesellschaft zur wissenschaftlichen Untersuchung von Parawissenschaften	Society for the Scientific Investigation of Parasciences	GWUP	1987	D-A-CH	Based in Roßdorf, Germany. Founding member.
Irish Skeptics Society	Irish Skeptics Society	ISS	2002	Ireland	
Klub Sceptyków Polskich	Polish Skeptics Club	KSP	2010	Poland	Member since 2017.
Observatoire Zététique	Zetetic Observatory	OZ	2003	France	
Skepsis ry	Skepsis	Skepsis	1987	Finland	
Skeptiker Schweiz – Verein für kritisches Denken	Swiss Skeptics – Association for Critical Thinking	Skeptiker	2012	Switzerland	
Stichting Skepsis	Skepsis Foundation	Skepsis	1987	Netherlands	Founding member.
Studiekring voor de Kritische Evaluatie van Pseudowetenschap en het Paranormale	Study Circle for the Critical Evaluation of Pseudoscience and the Paranormal	SKEPP	1990	Belgium	Serves Flanders and Brussels. Founding member.
Szkeptikus Társaság	Hungarian Skeptic Society	SzT	2006	Hungary	
Vereniging tegen de Kwakzalverij	Association against Quackery	VtdK	1881	Netherlands	No formal membership yet.
Český klub skeptiků Sisyfos	Czech Skeptics Club Sisyfos	Sisyfos	1995	Czech Republic	

Furthermore, the Committee for Skeptical Inquiry (CSI, formerly CSICOP), whose founder and long-time chairman Paul Kurtz was actively involved its formation (especially because the Skeptical Inquirer had many subscribers in Europe), and the Israel Skeptics Society are associate members of the ECSO.

== European Skeptics Congress ==
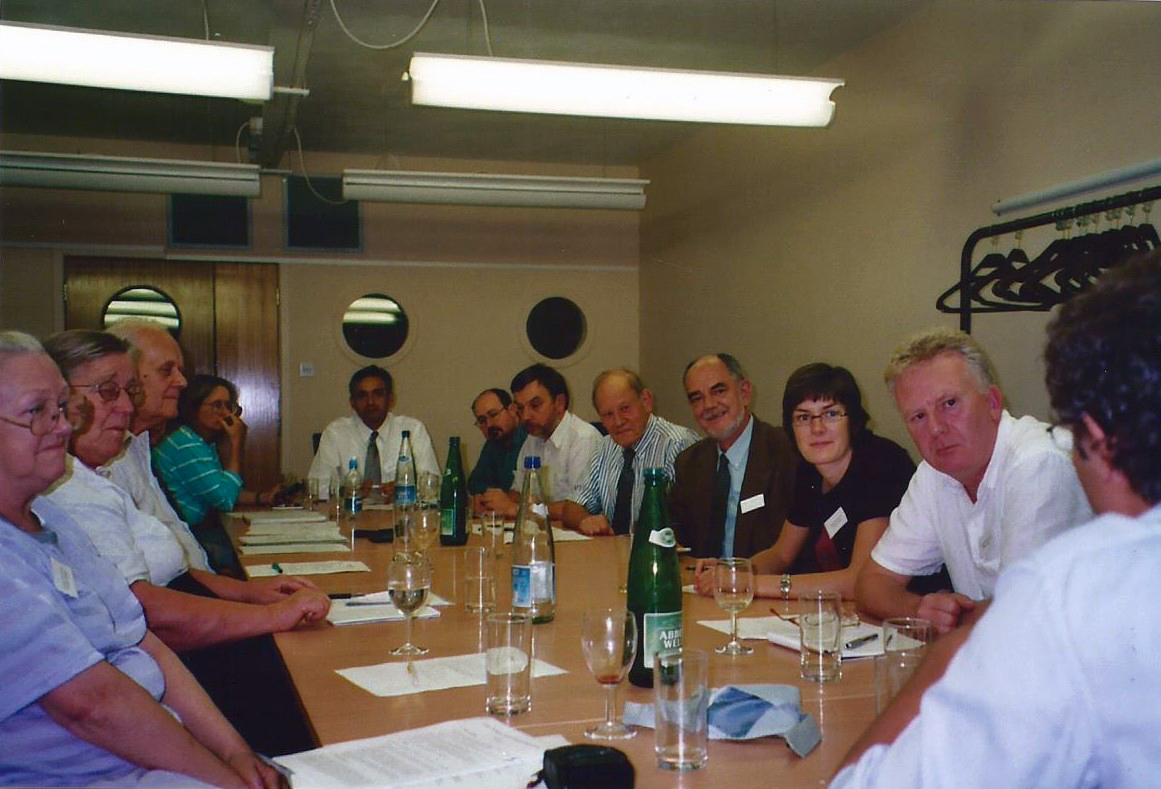
ECSO Board and CSICOP members meeting at the 11th European Skeptics Congress in London

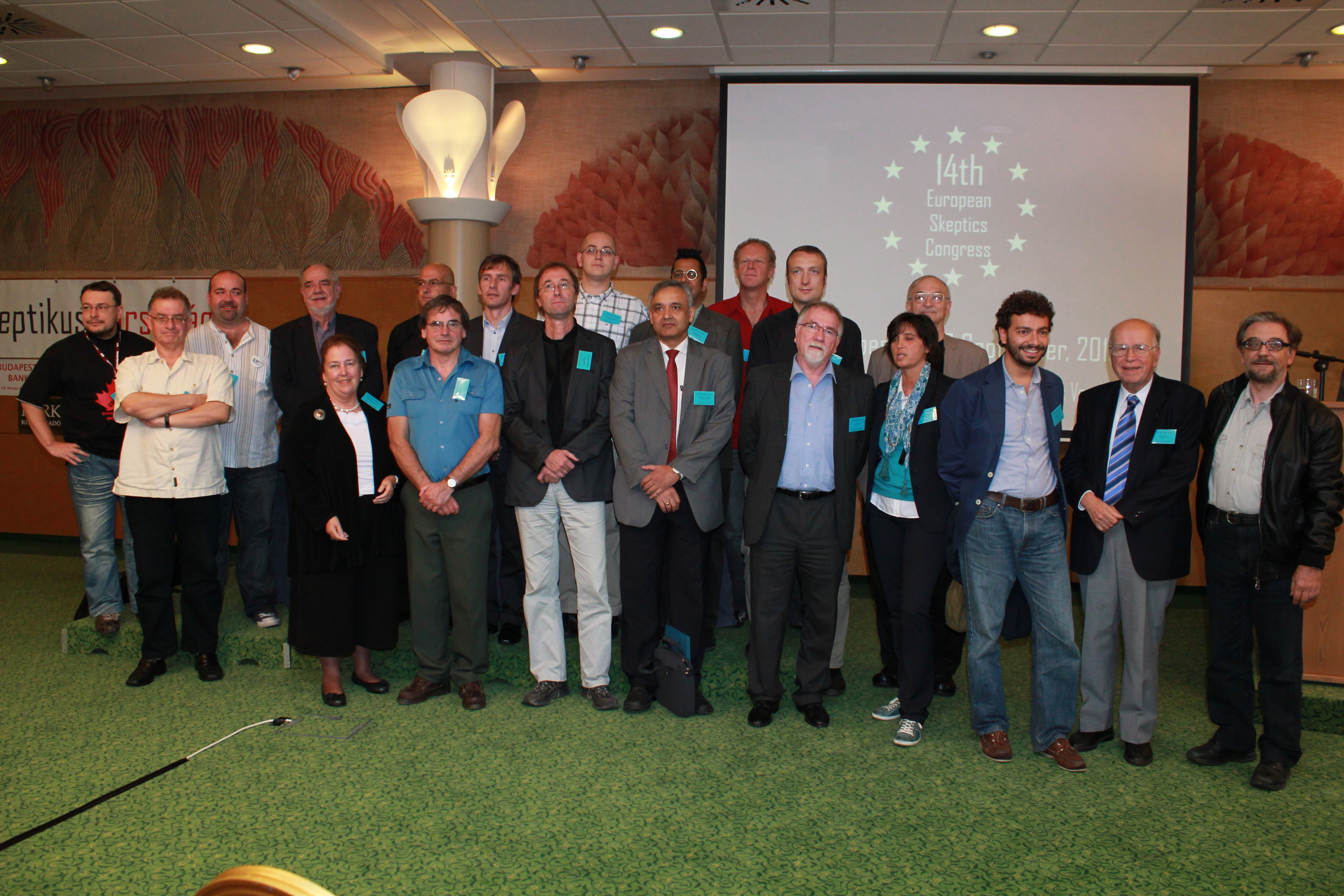
Speakers at the 14th European Skeptics Congress in Budapest

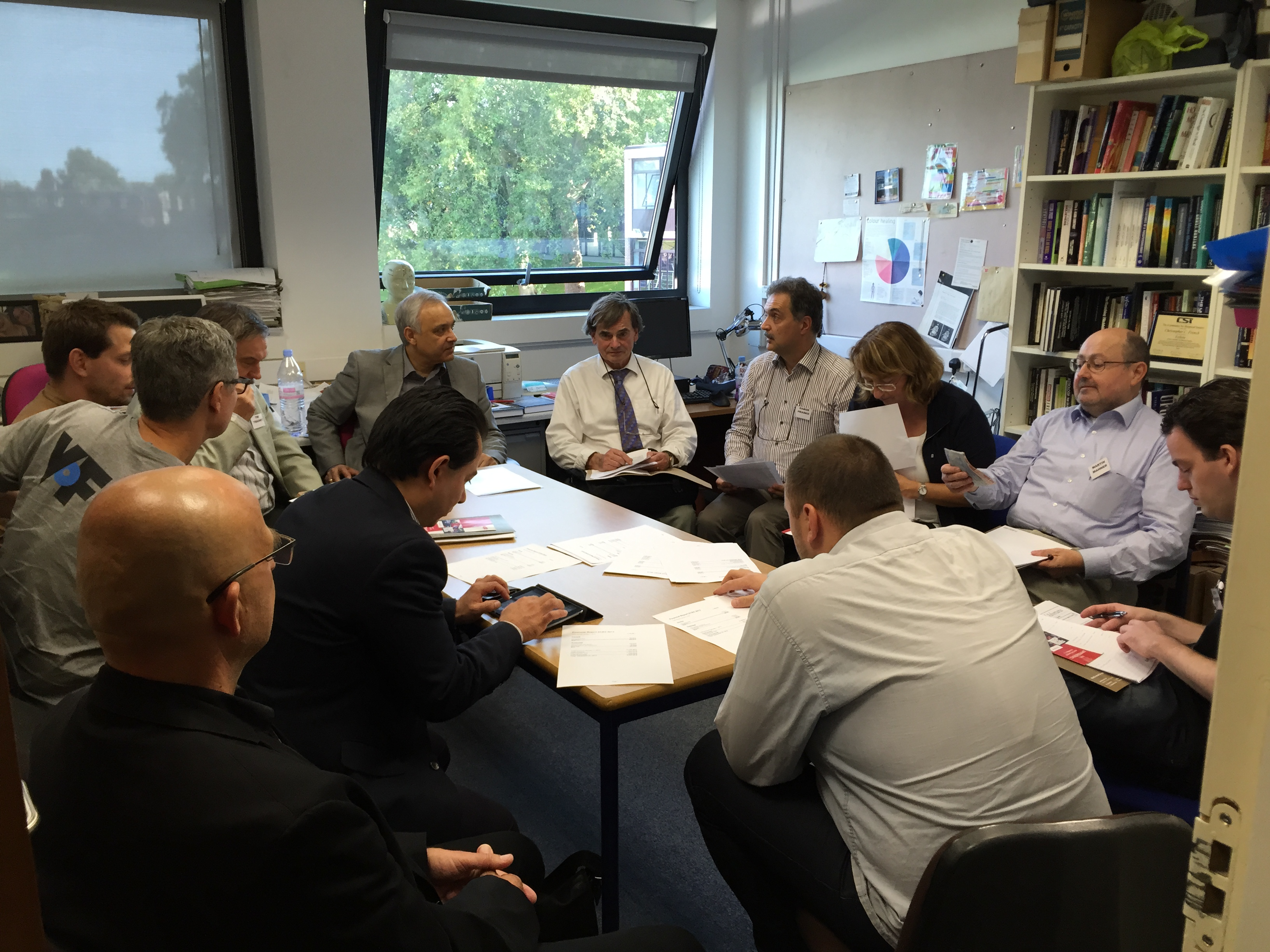
Meeting of the representatives of ECSO member organisations at the European Skeptics Congress 2015 in London

European Skeptics Congresses (ESCs), in which skeptical organisations from many different European countries participate, have been held ever since 1989. The conferences are often held in the month of September, and may last from two up to four days. The ECSO was formed at the 6th ESC on 25 September 1994 in Ostend, Belgium. Since its foundation, the ECSO co-ordinates in the organisation of new ESCs that take place (on average) every other year, and is hosted by a different member organisation each time. Skeptical organisations that are non-ECSO members may also send their delegations. Past ESCs have been:

Event	Date	City	Country	Notes
1st European Skeptics Congress	5–7 May 1989	Bad Tölz	West Germany	
2nd European Skeptics Congress	10–11 August 1990	Brussels	Belgium	
3rd European Skeptics Congress	4–5 October 1991	Amsterdam	Netherlands	
4th European Skeptics Congress	17–19 July 1992	Saint-Vincent	Italy	
5th European Skeptics Congress	29–31 August 1993	Keele	United Kingdom	Theme: "Science for Life: Health, Medicine and Well-Being". Organised by the UK Skeptics.
6th European Skeptics Congress	23–25 September 1994	Ostend	Belgium	Theme: "Science, Pseudoscience and the Environment". ECSO formed.
7th European Skeptics Congress	4–7 May 1995	Roßdorf	Germany	
8th European Skeptics Congress	4–7 September 1997	A Coruña	Spain	
9th European Skeptics Congress	17–19 September 1999	Maastricht	Netherlands	Hosted by Stichting Skepsis
10th European Skeptics Congress	7–9 September 2001	Prague	Czech Republic	Theme: "Rise and Development of Paranormal Beliefs in Eastern Europe"
11th European Skeptics Congress	5–7 September 2003	London	United Kingdom	
12th European Skeptics Congress	13–15 October 2005	Brussels	Belgium	Theme: "Pseudoscience, Alternative Medicine and the Media"
13th European Skeptics Congress	7–9 September 2007	Dublin	Ireland	Theme: "The Assault on Science: Constructing a Response" 100+ attendees.
14th European Skeptics Congress	17–19 September 2010	Budapest	Hungary	
15th European Skeptics Congress	22–25 August 2013	Stockholm	Sweden	Theme: "ESCape to Clarity!"
16th European Skeptics Congress	10–13 September 2015	London	United Kingdom	Organised by Association for Skeptical Enquiry and Anomalistic Psychology Research Unit
17th European Skeptics Congress	22–24 September 2017	Wrocław	Poland	"Where great minds meet" Organised by Klub Sceptyków Polskich and Český klub skeptiků Sisyfos
18th European Skeptics Congress	30 August – 1 September 2019	Ghent	Belgium	"The Joy of Skepticism" Organised by SKEPP and Comité Para
19th European Skeptics Congress	9 September – 11 September	Vienna	Austria	
20th European Skeptics Congress	30 May – 2 June 2024	Lyon	France	Organized by Association Française pour L'information Scientifique

== Other ==
Gábor Hraskó, who was then President of ECSO, stated in a 2015 interview that some goals of ECSO are to facilitate communication between the member groups; organise the regular conferences, and keep track of the active leaders for the various European groups. Sometimes a leader or a whole group will "disappear", and some groups are still active but with new leaders; it is important to "establish networks". At the 2015 conference held in London, Hraskó felt that he had learned a lot about organising from the UK skeptic groups. They operate differently than the continental Europeans, which tend to be one group that runs everything. The UK groups are all independent and more grassroots, but they end up working together on big conferences and projects. The 2017 conference "hopefully will be with the Polish and Czech skeptics". Hraskó stated that the Czech skeptics disappeared for some time, and he hopes that they have re-organised and they and the Polish skeptics will formalize the plans for the 2017 conference. This was achieved with the Polish Skeptics’ Club in cooperation with the Czech Skeptics’ Club Sisyfos organising the 17th biannual European Skeptics Congress 2017 in Wrocław, Poland. They were denied access to their initial venue on religious grounds, then they changed venue to the Faculty of Law, Administration and Economics at the University of Wrocław. The ECSO met at the end of the conference and new leadership was elected. Claire Klingenberg took over as president from Gábor Hraskó. In an interview with Eran Segev for the Skeptic Zone podcast, Klingenberg said that the conference “went great … quite productive and stimulating.” When Segev congratulated her on her new role as president of ECSO, he asked her what her top priority for ESCO was. Her answer was, “make ECSO important … it has to be more relevant, more influential … and seen as a partner not just with European skeptics, but with organizations all over the world.”

Catherine de Jong stated that having an organization overseeing the entire European skeptic groups is helpful to disseminate information when an alt med lecturer is planning a European tour. She gave the example of faith healer Peter Popoff being one who planned a tour of Europe. The UK skeptic Michael Marshall was able to contact the ECSO, who in turn were able to notify all the leaders of the other groups. They were able to share information and plan how to handle the events.

András Gabor Pinter reported from the 2019 conference in Belgium that they heard presentations about investigating psychics, the anti-vaccination movement, GMOs, and nuclear power. "Energy policies should be driven by science and as skeptics that’s what we advocate, after all."

== Awards ==
During the 6th World Skeptics Congress (Berlin, 18–20 May 2012), co-sponsored by the ECSO, GWUP and the Committee for Skeptical Inquiry (CSI), the ECSO presented the "Outstanding Skeptics Award" to Wim Betz (SKEPP) and Luigi Garlaschelli (CICAP) "in recognition of [their] dedication and outstanding contributions in promoting science and investigating extraordinary claims". Simultaneously, the CSI presented Simon Singh and Edzard Ernst with the "In Praise of Reason Award" "in recognition of [their] distinguished contribution to the use of critical inquiry, scientific evidence, and reason in evaluating claims to knowledge".

== See also ==
- European Humanist Federation
- List of skeptical conferences
- List of skeptical organizations
- QED: Question, Explore, Discover
- The Amaz!ng Meeting (TAM!)
