= István Vágó =

Hungarian broadcaster, television personality, quiz show host (1949–2023)

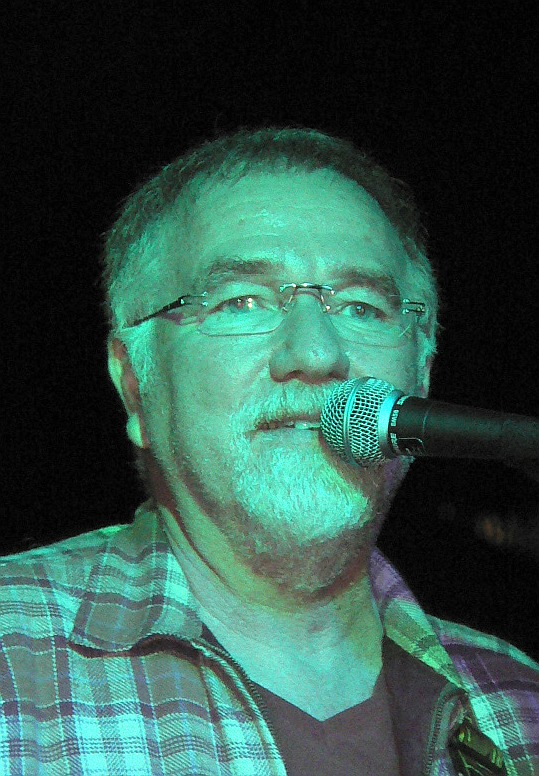
- Vágó in 2005
- Born: 14 February 1949; Budapest, Second Hungarian Republic
- Died: 29 April 2023 (aged 74); Budapest, Hungary
- Occupation: Television host
- Television: Who Wants to Be a Millionaire?
- Spouse: Judit
- Children: 1

István Vágó (14 February 1949 – 29 April 2023) was a Hungarian television host and political activist, best known as the host of "Legyen ön is Milliomos!" the Hungarian version of Who Wants to Be a Millionaire?.

== Life and career ==
Vágó was born and raised in Budapest. His original profession was a chemist, but he found a job working for Medimpex import-export company. Vágó spoke at least five languages.

When Vágó began his television career he wanted to create a political show, but it was impossible to create one like he wanted (dealing with internal politics, analyzing decisions of the system) at the time so he ended up hosting quiz shows. Vágó hosted various game shows, mostly quiz shows, since the '70s. He became one of the more popular television personalities in Hungary, and was usually known as "The Quiz Professor" by Hungarians. Vágó hosted Millionaire for several years; after a hiatus the show returned to the air in 2007, with Vágó hosting the redesigned show once again. The second run proved less successful and was canceled in 2008.

Vágó was the host of Magyar Televízió (MTV) for 22 years, then he changed for TV2, then RTL Klub. In 2009, he was the host of TV2, then hosted a game show Átvágó, co-created by himself on Story4, which was cancelled after one season. Following the cancellation of Átvágó he announced his retirement as a television host.

== Politics and views ==
Vágó was an atheist and skeptic, and was the former president of the Hungarian Skeptic Society. He vocally supported the Hungarian left-wing, most notably former prime minister Ferenc Gyurcsány and the liberal SZDSZ party. He was present at antifascist demonstrations. Vágó spawned controversy when he campaigned vocally for Ferenc Gyurcsány and health minister Ágnes Horváth. In 2014 he participated in the elections as a representative of the left wing, supporting Gyurcsány's party, Democratic Coalition.

In the 2014 municipal election, he ran as a candidate for local government as a joint candidate for the Democratic Coalition, the MSZP, the Co-PM, and the "European Federalists", though he told ATV that he did not understand local government politics. According to its flyer program, it would introduce a fairer local tax, abolish toll parking at unjustified locations, and take over the building, the burial cemetery of St. John's Parish in Upper Christina City on Apor Vilmos Square, and make it a playhouse to preserve Normafa and prevent any investment planned there. In an interview with HVG, he spoke in favor of Ferenc Gyurcsány and said that he was working to make DK leader a challenge for Viktor Orbán.

In January 2015, he joined the Democratic Coalition and became the leader of the party's media working group.

In September 2016, Vágó was elected DK XII. District Representative to the party's national organization, replacing Szabolcs Kerék-Bárczy, who left the party.

== Personal life and death ==
Vágó played the guitar since his early teens, and was the bassist of Hungarian band Favágók. He was a fan of The Beatles and Paul McCartney.

Vágó died on 29 April 2023, at age 74.
