= Cincinnati Lancet-Clinic =

American medical journal

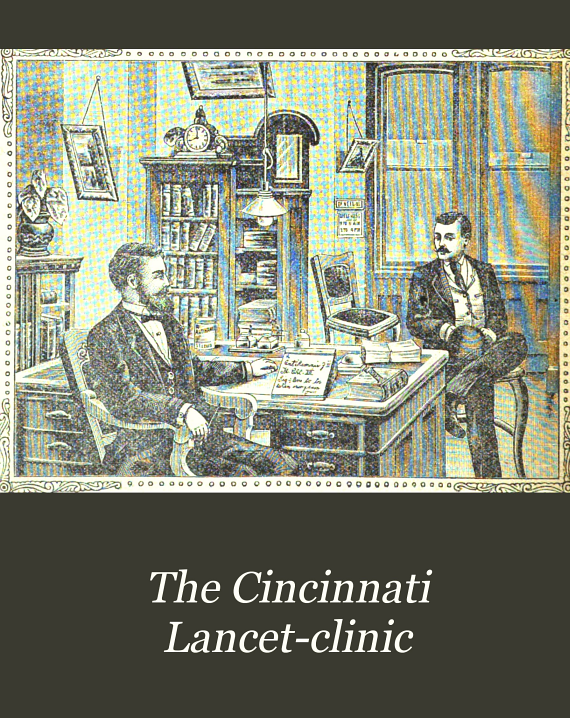
- Cover of New Series, Vol. XXXI. Whole Series Vol, LXX., July–December 1893
- Type: Weekly medical journal
- Format: Journal
- School: Medical College of Ohio
- Publisher: J. C. Culbertson, M.D.
- Editor: J. C. Culbertson, M.D.
- Founded: 1878
- Ceased publication: 1916
- Headquarters: Cincinnati, Ohio
- City: Cincinnati

The Cincinnati Lancet-Clinic was a weekly American medical journal published from 1878 to 1916, as a merger of earlier journals founded in 1842 and 1871.

The Western Lancet was founded as a monthly journal in 1842 with L. M. Lawson as its founding editor; it was one of the earliest medical journals in Cincinnati, Ohio. In 1858, it merged with the Medical Observer (founded 1856), under the title of the Cincinnati Lancet and Observer. In 1873, J. C. Culbertson purchased the journal.

The Clinic was founded in 1871 as a weekly journal by the faculty of the Medical College of Ohio. J. C. Culbertson gained control over it in 1878, and merged it with the Cincinnati Lancet and Observer, forming a combined weekly journal, the Cincinnati Lancet and Clinic, of which he and James G. Hyndman were the initial editors. It was renamed to the hyphenated Lancet-Clinic in 1888.

Along with a weekly publication, the journal also released a volume of works biannually. The volumes were separated by dates, with the first covering working from January 1 to June 30 and the second July 1 to December 31.

The journal ceased publication in November 1916, citing financial difficulties.
