= Association for Skeptical Enquiry =

Organization

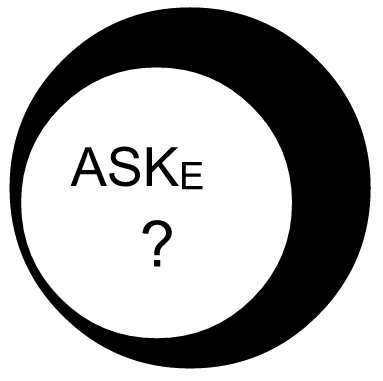
- "Casting a critical eye over suspect science, dubious claims and bizarre beliefs"
- Abbreviation: ASKE
- Formation: 1997; 29 years ago
- Type: Nonprofit organisation
- Purpose: Promoting the aims of skepticism, advising the public on extraordinary claims
- Headquarters: Sheffield
- Region served: United Kingdom
- Chairman: Michael Heap
- Website: aske-skeptics.org.uk Pronunciation of 'Association for Skeptical Enquiry'

The Association for Skeptical Enquiry (ASKE) is a skeptical organisation in the United Kingdom.

== History ==
ASKE was founded in 1997 by a steering committee of several people, including Anne Corden, Michael Heap, Marky O’Leary, Wayne Spencer, Tony Youens and Mark Gould. Among its founding members were psychologists, scientists, academics and civil servants. The purpose was to establish a national skeptical organisation in the UK that people could join and which promoted the aims of scientific skepticism by communicating with the media, advising the public on issues such as unorthodox medicine, paranormal claims and other "wild and unsubstantiated allegations", distributing newsletters and other publications, holding public meetings, and so on.

Once established, ASKE published a regular magazine, the Skeptical Intelligencer, initially edited by Wayne Spencer. The Skeptical Intelligencer now incorporates ASKE's newsletter the Skeptical Adversaria, and appears quarterly online (with hard copies available on request). The current editor is Michael Heap.

Deliberately on Friday 13 November 1998, ASKE and the Manchester Humanists held a conference at Manchester Metropolitan University to disprove several modern superstitions under the title "Paranormal and Superstitious Beliefs: A Skeptical Examination". Due to the University's safety regulations, however, the rational scientists (including Chris French, Michael Heap, Kevin McClure, Bob Morris, David Stretch, Tim Taylor, Richard Wiseman and Tony Youens) had to drop their plans of gleefully breaking mirrors, walking under ladders, and even ushering black cats across their paths. Also, archaeologist Taylor criticised writer Graham Hancock's "ludicrous" hypothesis about several structures built across the world in ancient times were the product of a single global lost civilisation; he branded his work on this topic as "pseudo-archaeology" and being "far beyond the facts of the matter in terms of things like radio carbon-dating."

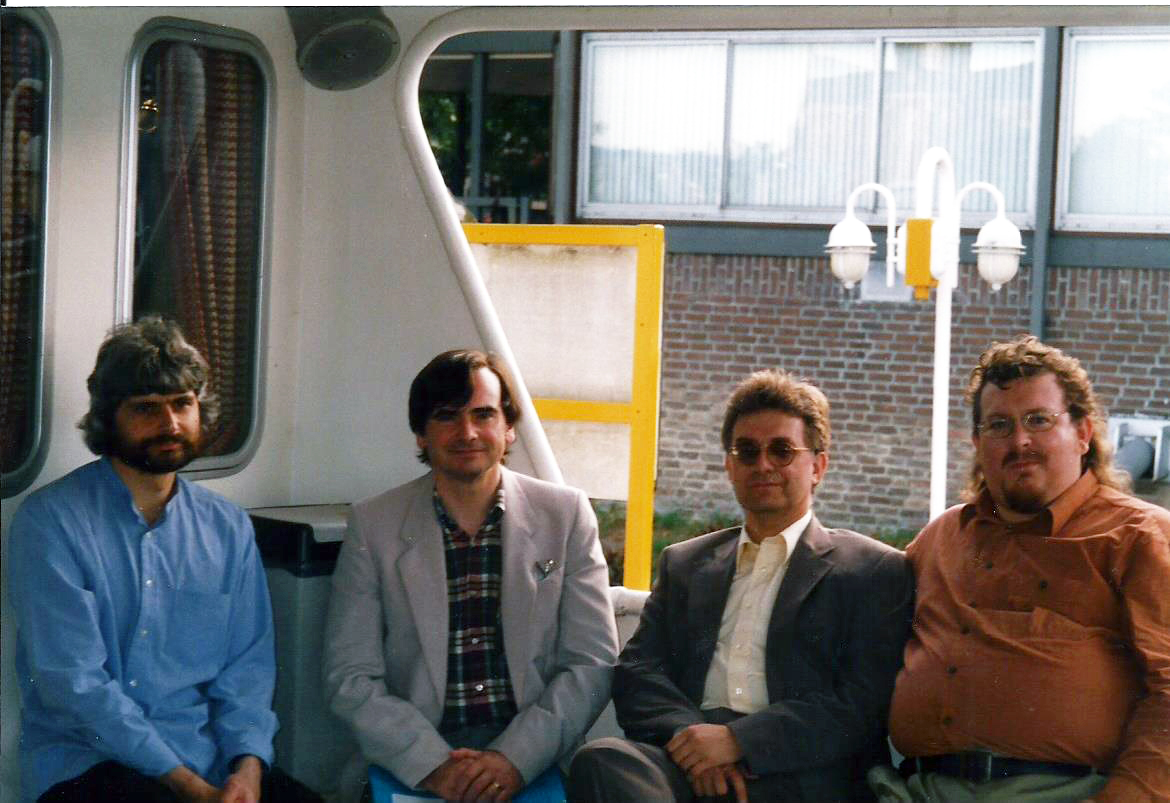
Spencer, Heap, French and O'Leary on a boat trip in Maastricht during the 9th European Skeptics Congress in 1999.

On 16 July 1999, ASKE and the Anomalistic Psychology Research Unit (APRU) of Goldsmiths College jointly organised the conference "Parapsychology: Current status and future prospects" at Goldsmiths College of the University of London.

Between 1997 and 2001, ASKE attracted more than 70 members from the United Kingdom as far afield as Malta, Italy and the United States. Paranormal investigator Tony Youens said that despite frequent stories of haunting ghosts, he has had "surprisingly" few invitations to examine such claims of paranormal activity in these years. The people reporting such events, though "often deeply upset and concerned" by them, "don't want you to take a look". Youens maintains that, when given the chance, everything can be explained, and that there are no supernatural phenomena whatsoever.

In 2003, having been affiliated to the European Council of Skeptical Organisations (ECSO), ASKE hosted the 11th European Skeptics Congress in London. From 11 to 13 September 2015 it hosted the 16th European Skeptics Congress jointly with the APRU of Goldsmiths College.

In 2005 self-proclaimed psychic "Shirley Ghostman" brought cameras to be tested by Youens (ASKE), French (APRU), Wendy M. Grossman (The Skeptic) and two others, and failed. Afterwards they discovered he was actually comedian Marc Wootton recording his documentary High Spirits with Shirley Ghostman. Later that year, Youens gave an interview to Skepticality, where he explained what tricks mediums use and how to spot them.

== Paranormal challenge ==
ASKE offers a prize of several thousand pounds to anyone who could demonstrate paranormal abilities under scientifically controlled conditions. In the early years, there were very few enquiries, and for some time ASKE offered to screen potential claimants for other major international prizes instead. In 2012–2013, ASKE awarded £400 to anyone who passed the British preliminary test to the €1,000,000 Sisyphus Prize by SKEPP in Belgium. Since 27 August 2016, ASKE once again offers its own prize of £10,000 'to anyone who can successfully demonstrate ‘a paranormal ability’ which they claim to possess'.

Several applicants have tried to claim the prizes. To date no claimant has been able to pass any of the scientific tests. ASKE’s best applicant was a dowser, “a very pleasant, very smart retired engineer in Milton Keynes.” Chris French helped Heap devise a test, and they traveled to Milton Keynes to carry it out. “He failed completely, but it was an interesting day. He accepted that he thought he would succeed, and didn’t. My take on this was that this chap has been doing dowsing for years and years and has convinced himself that it works and feels he has a lot of evidence on his side that it works. We test him, it doesn’t work, but he doesn’t dismiss the rest of the evidence. It’s reasonable for him to say that he couldn’t pass the test but that doesn’t mean I don’t have the ability.”

== See also ==
- Edinburgh Skeptics
- List of prizes for evidence of the paranormal
- Merseyside Skeptics Society
- Skeptics in the Pub in the United Kingdom
