= 10:23 Campaign =

International awareness campaign against homoeopathy

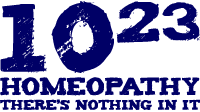
English 10:23 logo.

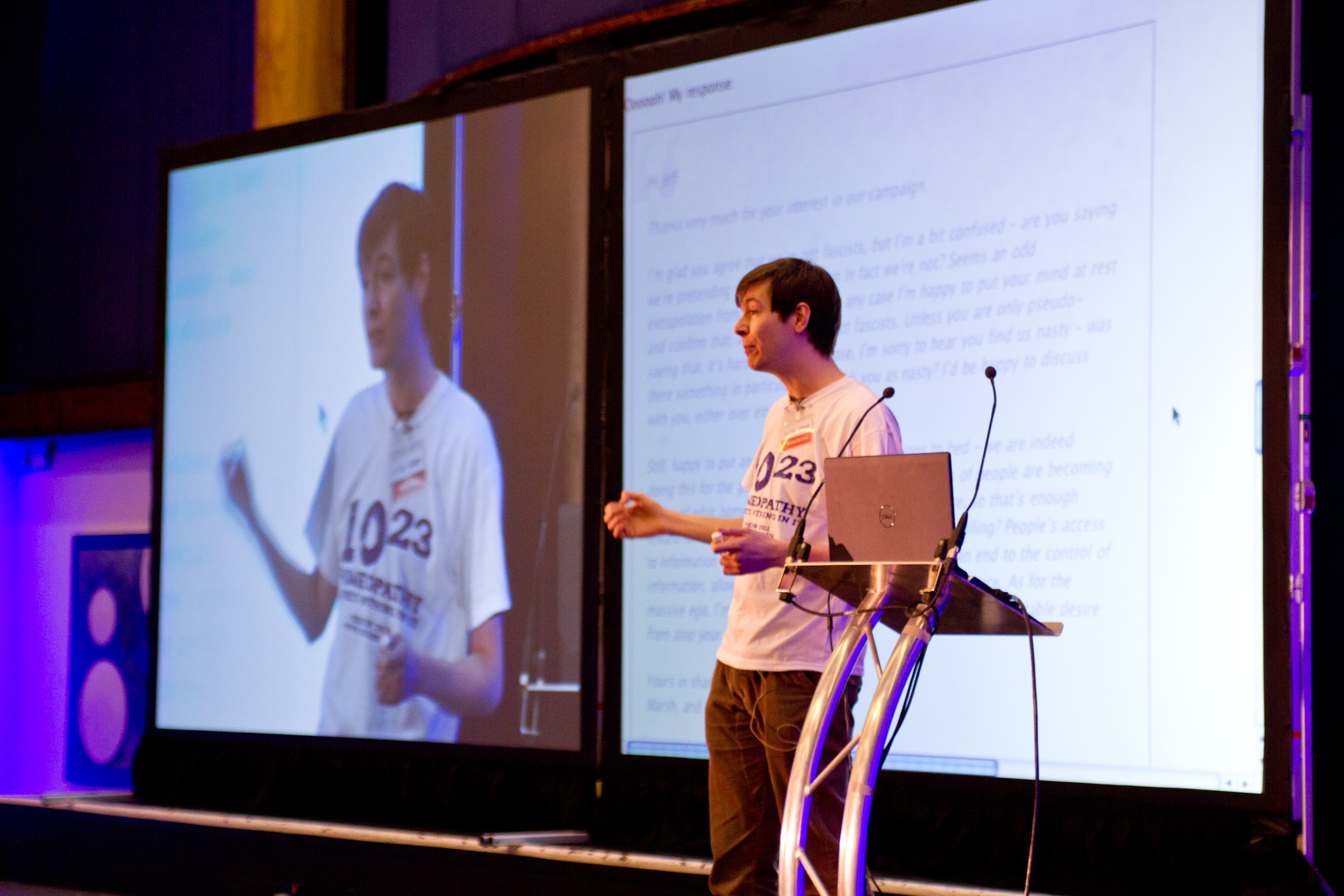
Michael Marshall leads a homoeopathic overdose at QED 2011.

The 10:23 Campaign (stylized as 10^{23}) is an awareness and protest campaign against homoeopathy organised by the Merseyside Skeptics Society, a non-profit organisation, to oppose the sale of homoeopathic products in the United Kingdom. The campaign has staged public "overdoses" of homoeopathic preparations.

== Origin and name ==
In 2004, the Belgian skeptical organisation SKEPP made headlines when thirty skeptics at Ghent University performed a "mass suicide stunt" with an overdose of homeopathically diluted snake poison, belladonna and arsenic, in an attempt to publicly show that homeopathy does not work. When Belgian skeptics met with Merseyside Skeptics during a Skeptics in the Pub in 2010, the idea was adopted to hold an international event.

The campaign's name, 10:23, comes from the Avogadro number, which is approximately 6.022 × 10^{23}.

== Aims ==
The campaign aims to raise awareness of implausible and unsubstantiated claims made by homoeopaths. It opposes high street retailers, such as Boots UK, stocking homoeopathic remedies alongside medicine, saying that "the support lent by Boots to this quack therapy contributes directly to its acceptance as a valid medical treatment by the British public, acceptance it does not warrant and support it does not deserve."

The organisers state that homoeopathy is "an unscientific and absurd pseudoscience", and that, according to their statement, "There is nothing in it." They question the ethics of selling treatments to the public which have not been proven to be efficacious and are widely disregarded by the scientific community.

== Participation ==
10:23 by the Hungarian Skeptic Society. Szeged, 5 February 2011

10:23 by Society against Quackery and Stichting Skepsis members and sympathisers in Amsterdam

On 30 January 2010, members participated in a protest involving a mass overdose of homoeopathic products to demonstrate its inefficacy. Many protesters stood outside branches of Boots UK, other shops selling homoeopathic products, and other prominent public spaces and took 84 pills each of arsenicum album, 20 times the recommended dose.

A second overdose was organised for 5–6 February 2011. Worldwide, the campaign received commitments of participation from 70 cities in 30 countries. In the United Kingdom, events took place in Manchester, as part of the QED Conference, and Cardiff. The original Belgian SKEPP and the Dutch organisations Vereniging tegen de Kwakzalverij and Stichting Skepsis also participated in the worldwide 10:23 Campaign. They carried out their tongue-in-cheek suicide attempt in Brussels and Amsterdam specifically to protest the recognition of homeopathic preparations by the European Parliament. Czech Sisyfos organization joined this happening when its members tried to publicly overdose themselves in Prague.

In April 2012, at the Berkeley SkeptiCal conference, over 100 people participated in a mass overdose, taking caffea cruda, which is intended to treat sleeplessness.

There have been no reports of ill effects following any of the overdoses.

== Support ==
Notable scientists and public figures have shown support for the 10:23 Campaign, including Phil Plait, James Randi Educational Foundation, Simon Singh, Steven Novella, Penn Jillette, and the Richard Dawkins Foundation for Reason and Science.

James Randi invited advocates and retailers of homoeopathy to take the One Million Dollar Paranormal Challenge to prove that homoeopathy was efficacious to win a prize and himself overdosed on homoeopathic sleeping pills as part of his stage show.

== Reaction and media coverage ==
The campaign gained international coverage in the press from The Australian, The Medical Observer, BBC, The Independent, The Telegraph, and The Guardian.

The British Homeopathic Association dismissed the 10:23 Campaign as "grossly irresponsible", describing the public overdose as dangerous, and claimed that the participants had no understanding of how to select remedies appropriately.

Melbourne-based Dr Ken Harvey told Pharmacy News "the campaign would raise awareness of the Therapeutic Goods Administration (TGA) transparency review and concerns over homeopathic products."

== Gallery ==
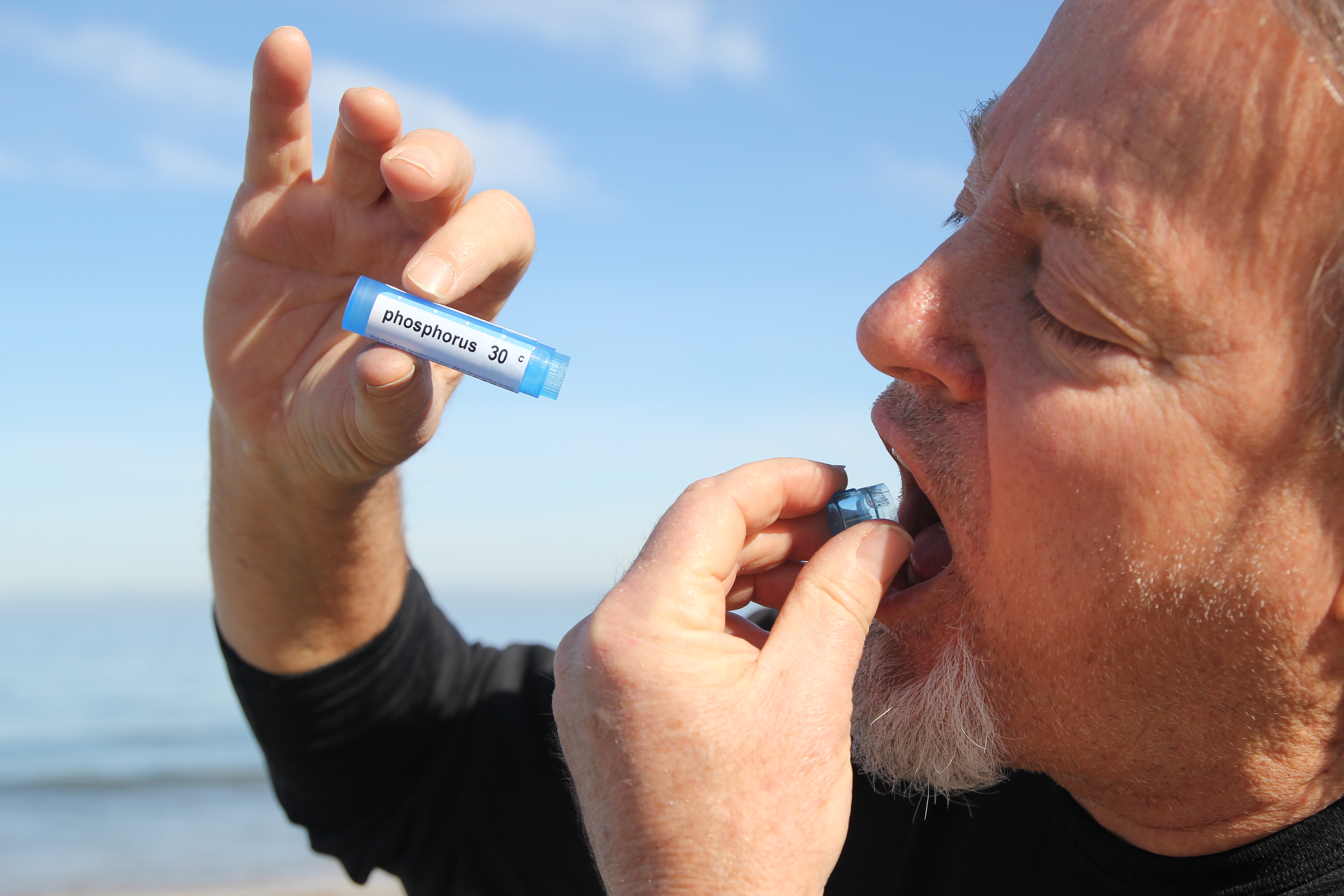
Skeptical activist and magician Mark Edward overdoses in Monterey, CA 2011

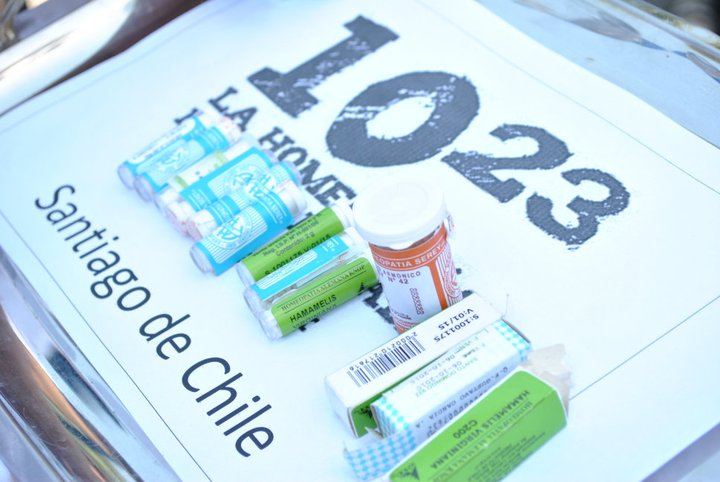
Tray shows products used in Chile in 2011

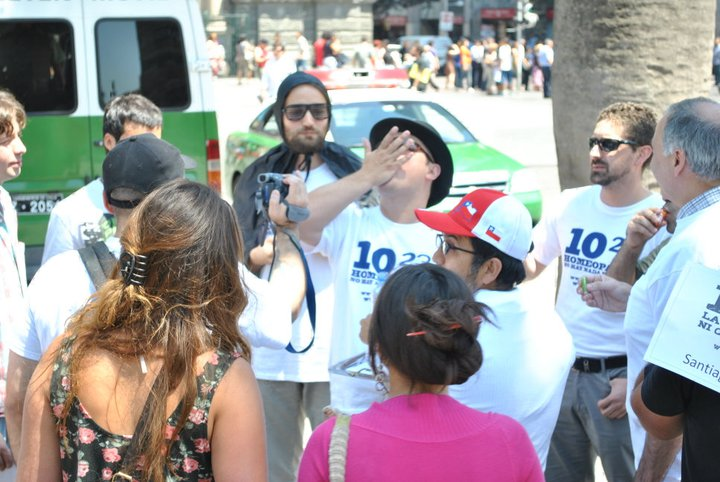
10:23 campaign in Santiago, Chile 2011

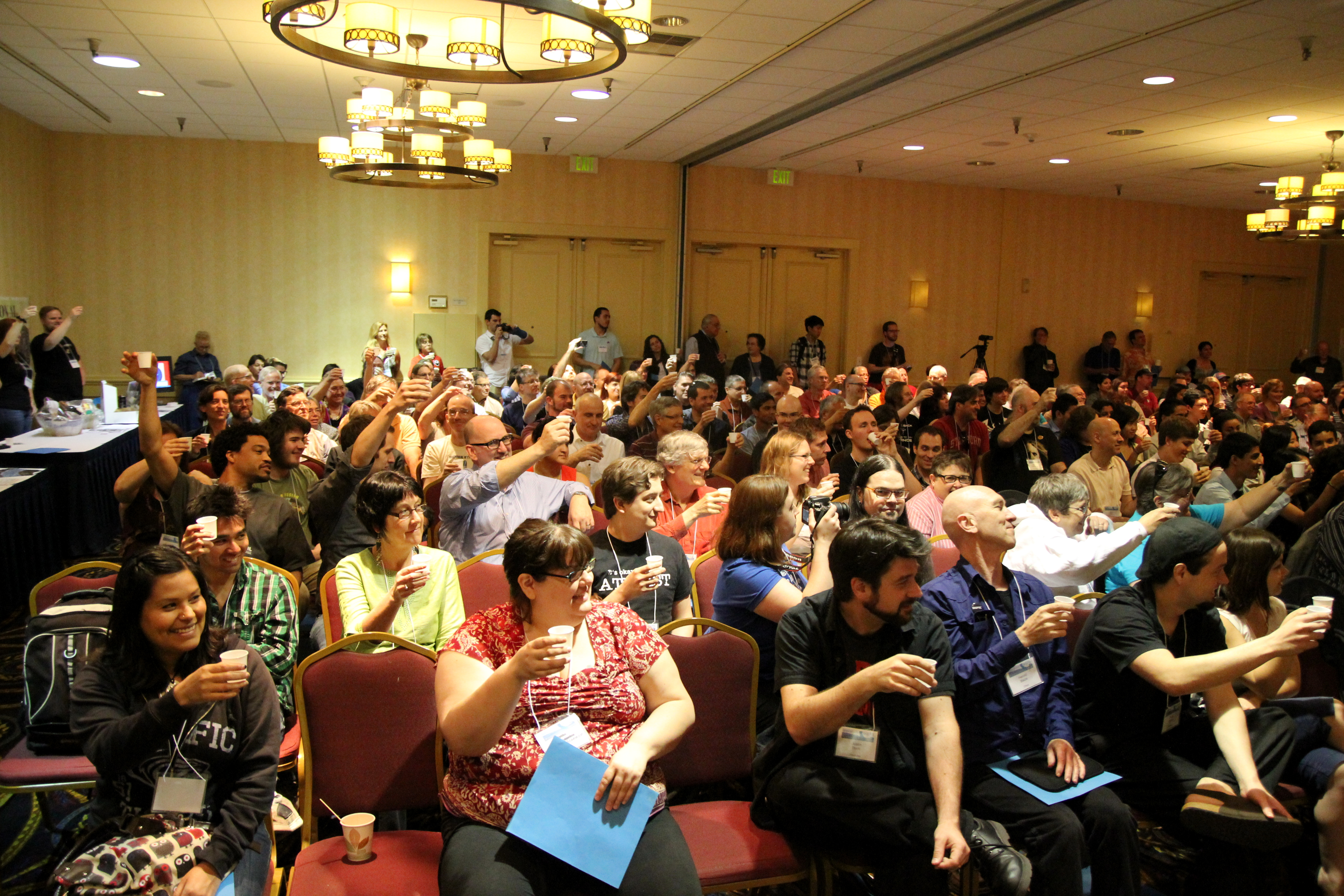
SkeptiCal group overdosing on homoeopathic solution. Berkeley, CA 21 April 2012

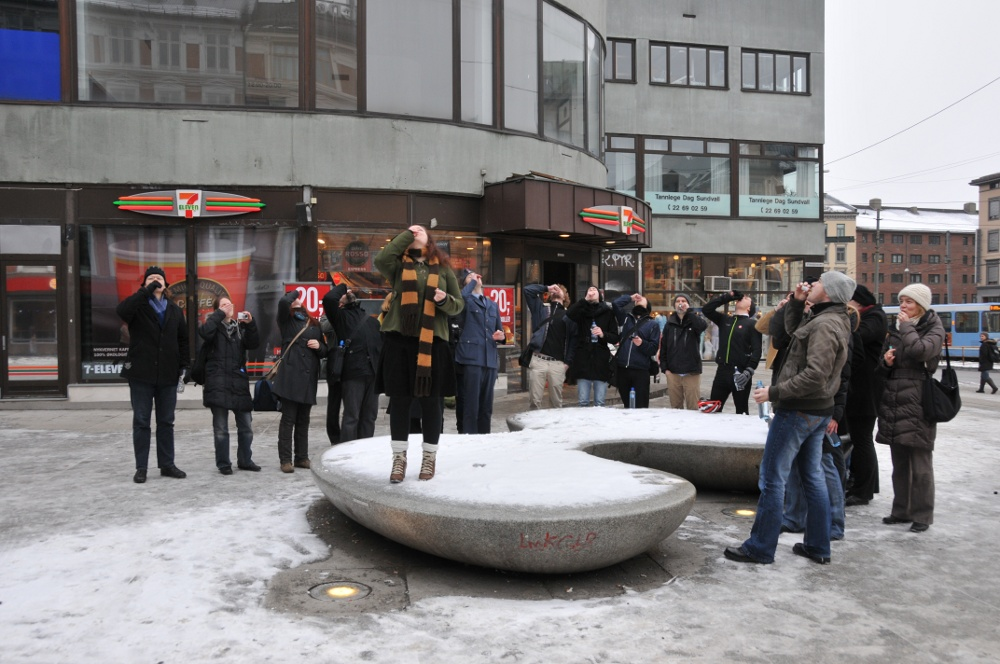
10:23 campaign in Oslo, Norway, 2011
