= Merseyside Skeptics Society =

Organisation promoting scientific scepticism

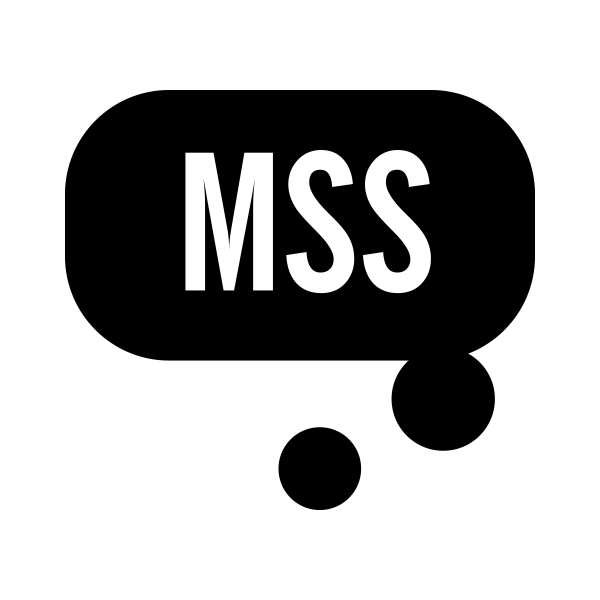
- Logo
- Abbreviation: MSS
- Formation: February 2009; 17 years ago
- Type: Nonprofit organisation
- Purpose: Development and support of the sceptic community
- Region served: Merseyside
- President: Michael Marshall
- Website: merseysideskeptics.org.uk

The Merseyside Skeptics Society (MSS) is a nonprofit organisation that promotes scientific scepticism in Merseyside and the United Kingdom. Founded in 2009, the society has campaigned against the use of homeopathy, challenged the claims of psychics, and hosts regular events in Liverpool, podcasts, and an annual conference in Manchester, QED: Question. Explore. Discover.

As part of their Liverpool Skeptics in the Pub events the society hosts guest speakers, who have included Simon Singh, David Nutt, and Robert Llewellyn. It also organises the 10:23 Campaign against homeopathy.

== History ==
The Merseyside Skeptics Society was founded in February 2009 to develop and support the sceptical community in Merseyside. The Society held its first speaker's meeting on 17 September 2009 at the Crown Hotel in Liverpool, England. Professor Chris French, editor of The Skeptic magazine gave a talk entitled "The Psychology of Anomalous Experiences". Merseyside Skeptics Society Limited was registered in the United Kingdom as a private, limited by guarantee, no share capital company on 20 August 2010.

According to co-founder Michael Marshall, the group chose to use the American spelling of 'skeptic' because "in the States, the word isn’t as strongly linked to cynicism. It's not seen as being as negative as it is over here."

When climate change deniers began identifying as sceptics, vice president Michael Marshall made a clear distinction, stating: "In our view, climate change sceptics are not sceptics. A sceptic looks at the available evidence and makes a decision, and for homeopathy the evidence is that it doesn't work. But the sceptical position on climate change is that it is happening."

== Activities ==
=== Meetings ===
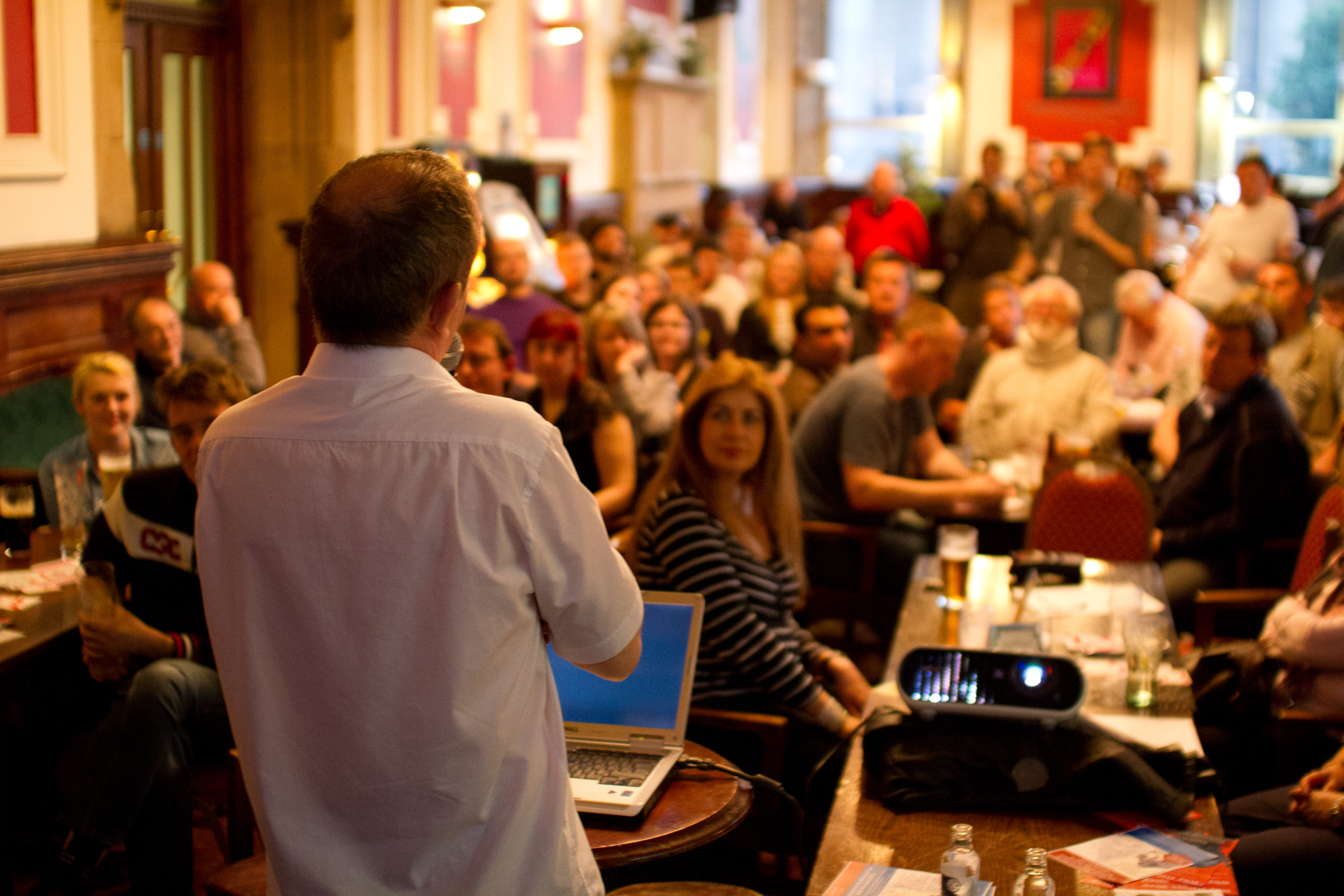
Brian Deer talks to the Merseyside Skeptics Society at a Skeptics in the Pub meeting

The Society holds several regular meetings in the Liverpool area, including the Liverpool Skeptics in the Pub, Skeptic Dinners, and Women's Socials. Liverpool Skeptics in the Pub holds two meetings a month, one of which is a social event and the other of which features a guest speaker. Guest speakers have included Ariane Sherine, Simon Singh, David Aaronovitch, Evan Harris, Elizabeth Pisani, Brian Deer, Jon Ronson, Stephen Law, David Nutt, Mark Stevenson, Mark Lynas and Robert Llewellyn, among others. Topics covered vary widely and include health care, science, atheism, the paranormal and supernatural, psychics, politics and psychology.

=== Homeopathy ===
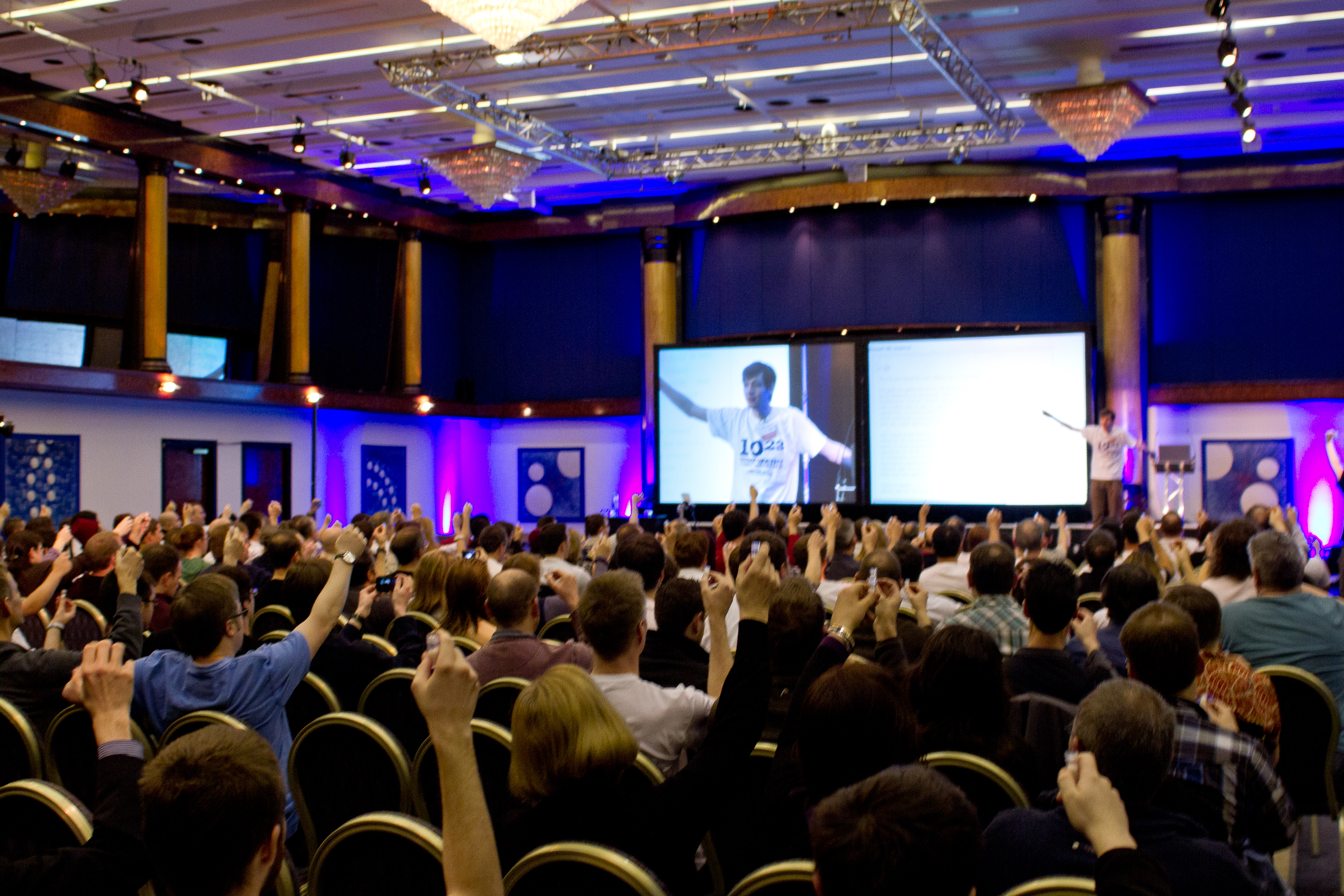
Michael Marshall leads a homeopathic overdose during QED 2011 in Manchester.

In 2009, the society wrote an open letter to pharmacy chain Boots in which they denounced the sales of homeopathic products in their store. In the letter they wrote that "We trust brands such as Boots to check the facts for us ... We don't expect to find products on the shelf at our local pharmacy which do not work", calling for them to remove the "bogus therapy" from their shelves.

The Society organised the 10:23 Campaign to raise awareness of, and campaign against, homeopathy. This campaign included protests in 2010 against Boots for selling homeopathic preparations as equivalent to mainstream, scientifically-based medicine and involved mass homeopathic overdoses outside Boots stores to mock what the protesters asserted to be the lack of efficacy in homeopathic products.

Following the overdose, Boots responded by saying "We know that many people believe in the benefits of complementary medicines and we aim to offer the products we know our customers want." These protests took place in 70 cities in 30 countries around the world, including Australia and New Zealand, and resulted in no ill effects to those taking the products.

In addition, the Society has complained about GPs who have advocated alternative medicine including homeopathy.

=== Sports wristband test ===
In 2012, Merseyside Skeptics Society investigated claims that the Shuzi Qi sports wristbands – bands supposed to improve athletic performance similar to Power Balance bands – had any effect. These bands were promoted in marketing materials as containing a computer chip programmed to "resonate with blood cells' natural frequencies", improving circulation by causing them to "unclump". The study cited by Shuzi UK used a technique called live blood cell analysis which has been discredited, and Merseyside Skeptics Society characterized the claims as "nonsensical techno-babble".

After the society conducted tests with a rugby player, it was reported that the bands had made "no discernable difference" and that when subject to double blind trials, the product failed to have any effect on the rugby player's performance. Following the test, a spokesman for Shuzi UK stated that the claims made on its UK website would be updated; however, the director of the company claimed that the tests were biased and unfair.

=== Challenging psychic claims ===
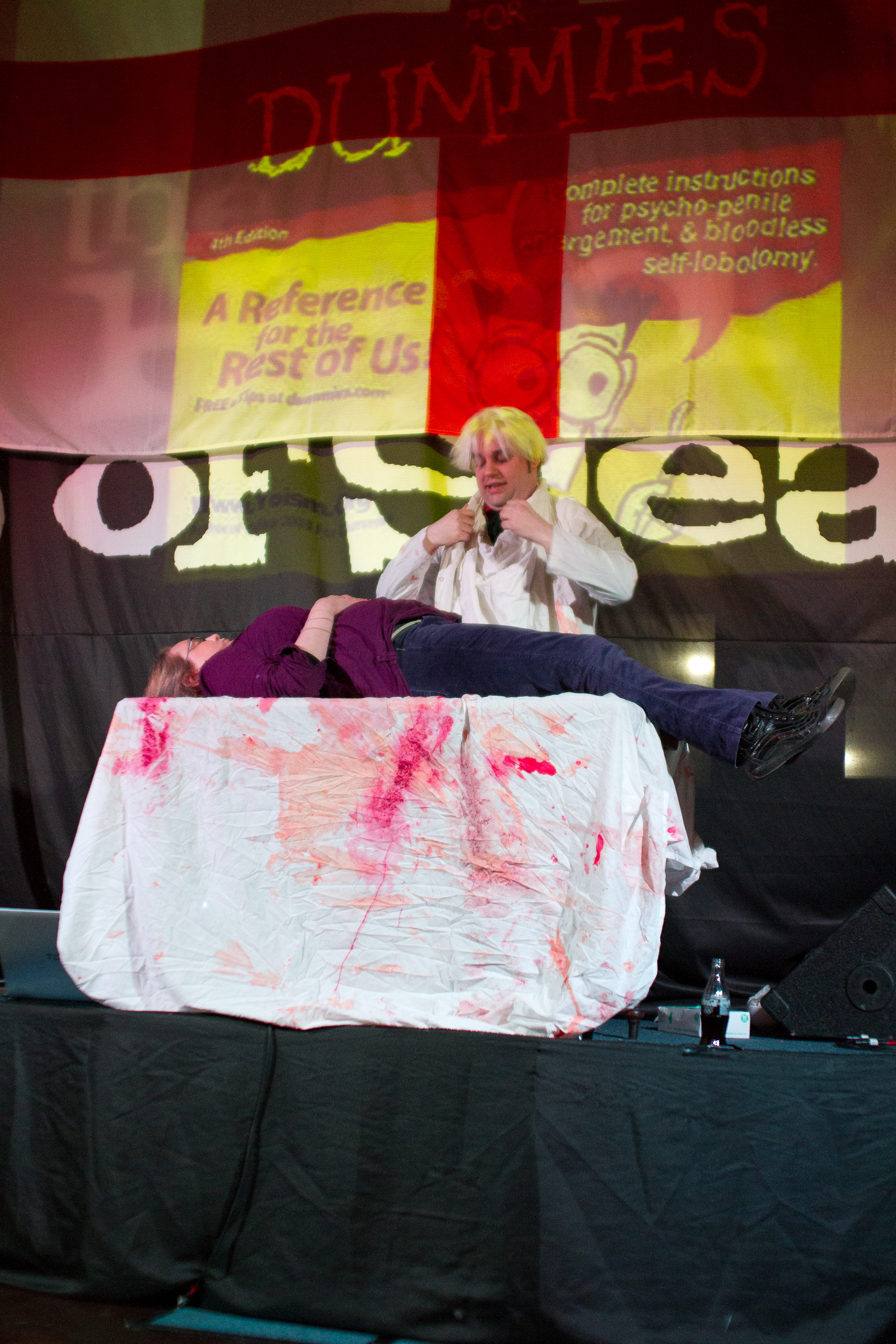
Ash Pryce demonstrating psychic surgery at a Skeptics in the Pub meeting

In 2011, celebrity psychic Sally Morgan was accused of having an off-stage assistant at her shows who passed information to her via radio. Merseyside Skeptics Society subsequently challenged her to participate in a test of her supposed powers, designed by psychologist Chris French. Around the same time, Simon Singh received emails from Sally Morgan's solicitor, stating that she had instructed the solicitor to "take libel proceedings, if necessary, in relation to allegations that she is a cheat" following the campaign encouraging her to take the test.

The Society turned the initial challenge into an annual event titled the "Halloween Challenge"; a scientific test to investigate if professional mediums could demonstrate psychic abilities in a controlled setting. In 2012, researchers at Goldsmiths, University of London conducted the challenge with two professional mediums, who both agreed beforehand that it was a fair test of their abilities, asking them to attempt to identify information about five volunteers they had not previously met and could not see. The experiment involved the mediums writing details about the volunteers, who then had to identify themselves from the descriptions. With a success rate of one in five, the results showed little evidence of the mediums' claimed psychic ability. One of the mediums described the test as "designed to confirm the researchers' preconceptions", saying that she had to work face-to-face to make a connection.

Vice-president Michael Marshall supported the ban of the sale of tarot readings and spells on eBay in 2012, stating he thought it was "solid consumer protection". He continued that "tarot, spells and curses are all highly unproven", noting that although many tarot readers are sincere and believe they have psychic abilities, "that doesn't make it any more real."

When the owner of a missing cat in Lincolnshire enlisted the help of a psychic, who said that it had been adopted by another family and would be found in an area children play, the society said: "Both of these are incredibly obvious scenarios to suggest for a missing cat, and would likely be the suggestions you'd get from someone without psychic powers – and without the need for a fee, too."

In June 2010, Liverpudlian psychic Joe Power made allegations to the police that threats of violence had been directed towards him from members of the society on social media site Facebook. After police contacted the society in regards to the claims, a member was able to explain that the allegations were unfounded. In a statement on their website following the incident, they wrote "nobody involved with the Merseyside Skeptics Society – or anyone that I even know of – has ever made threats to Joe or his family, and we absolutely never will."

=== Podcasts ===
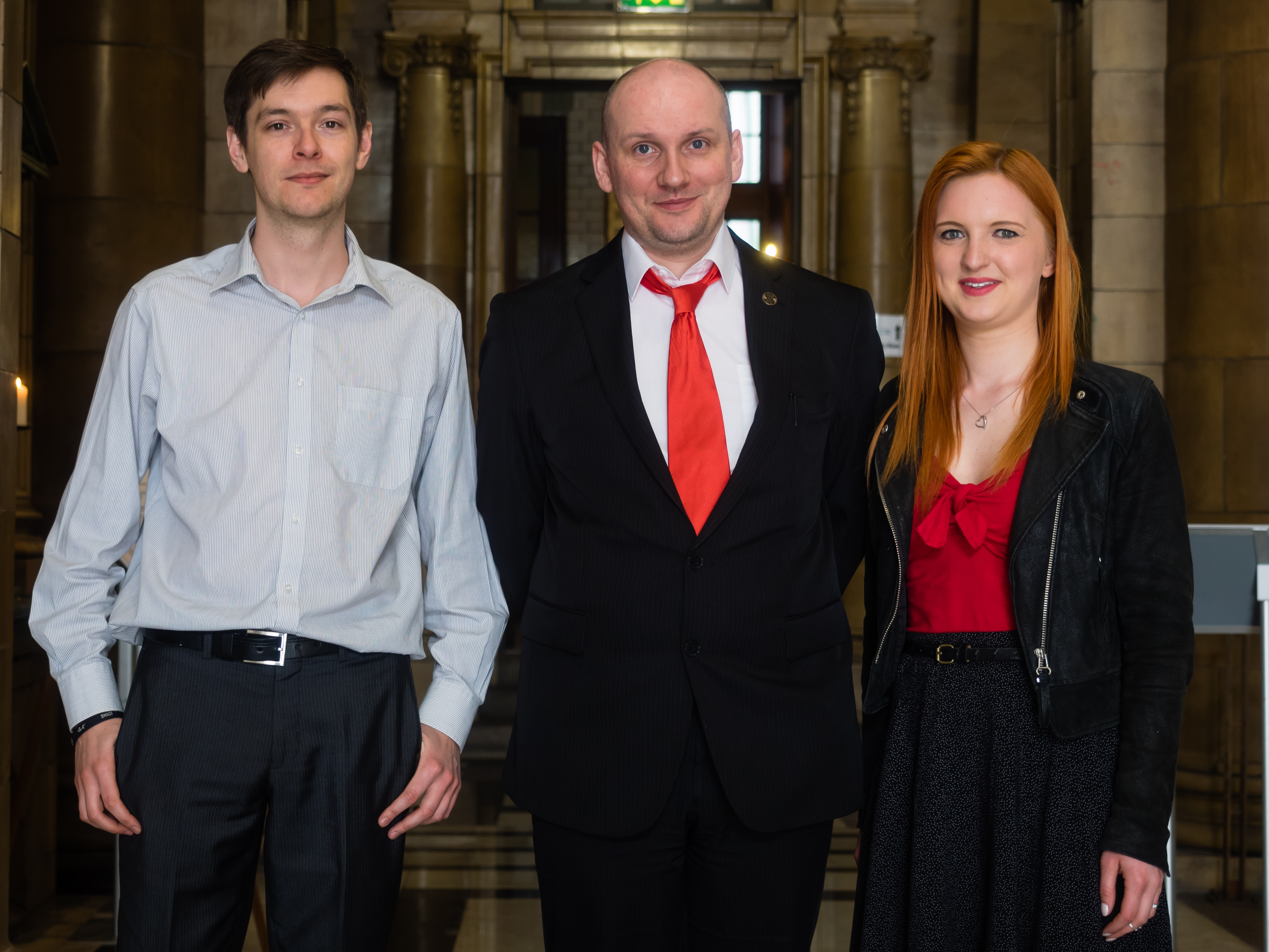
The current Skeptics with a K lineup: Michael "Marsh" Marshall, Mike Hall, and Alice Howarth, at the 2015 QED conference in Manchester.

Skeptics with a K intro

InKredulous intro

Be Reasonable intro

Merseyside Skeptics Society produces four podcasts titled Skeptics with a K, InKredulous, The Skeptic Podcast and Be Reasonable.

==== Skeptics with a K ====
Skeptics with a K, "the podcast for science, reason and critical thinking", is the official podcast of the Society. Its first episode was recorded on 28 July 2009, at Mike Hall's home. The podcast features hosts Mike Hall, Michael "Marsh" Marshall and Colin Harris – in April 2014 replaced by Alice Howarth – discussing recent events from a skeptical point of view. Co-host Michael Marshall described it as, "a fairly-shambolic, overly-enthusiastic and snarky mix of science, skepticism and sarcasm." A popular semi-regular segment, until 14 July 2011 when it concluded with a special "Best of" edition, was a fact check on the children's book The Giant Book of Fantastic Facts. On 1 April 2013, an entire episode consisted of fictional stories including a parody of Ghost Busters, a story about the "Mersey Book of Monsters" and one about the "Paranormal Investigation Society Scotland (PISS)". The hosts have appeared as guests on other popular podcasts including Cognitive Dissonance and the Token Skeptic.

==== InKredulous ====
InKredulous is a comedy panel quiz show, inspired by shows such as Mock the Week, Have I Got News for You, and The News Quiz, featuring a variety of guests from the sceptic community. In the pilot episode, host Andy Wilson described it as "the quiz show where we satirically examine news stories, websites, events and personalities who will tweak the spider sense of our sceptical listeners and delicious looking panelists." The first episode was released on 8 February 2010. Hosts of other podcasts are frequently guests, including Steven Novella of The Skeptics' Guide to the Universe, Robin Ince of Infinite Monkey Cage, George Hrab of Geologic, Brian Dunning of Skeptoid, Kylie Sturgess of Token Skeptic, Ross Blocher and Carrie Poppy of Oh No, Ross and Carrie!, and others. Other notable guests include David Aaronovitch, Paul Zenon, and Jon Ronson.

==== Be Reasonable ====
Be Reasonable is a monthly interview show that engages guests with ideas outside the mainstream scientific consensus, such as a member of the Flat Earth Society. In the first episode, on 28 January 2013, hosts Hayley Stevens (until June 2014) and Michael Marshall described the show as an examination of their guests' beliefs and their structure, and the evidence they believe supports these beliefs. Guests have discussed past life therapy, aura photography and the presence of aliens on Earth.

==== The Skeptic Podcast ====
Since February 2025, The Skeptic Podcast has released fortnightly episodes, featuring selected articles from back issues of The Skeptic magazine, narrated by members of the Merseyside Skeptics Society, including the hosts of Skeptics with a K and Inkredulous.

=== QED: Question, Explore, Discover ===
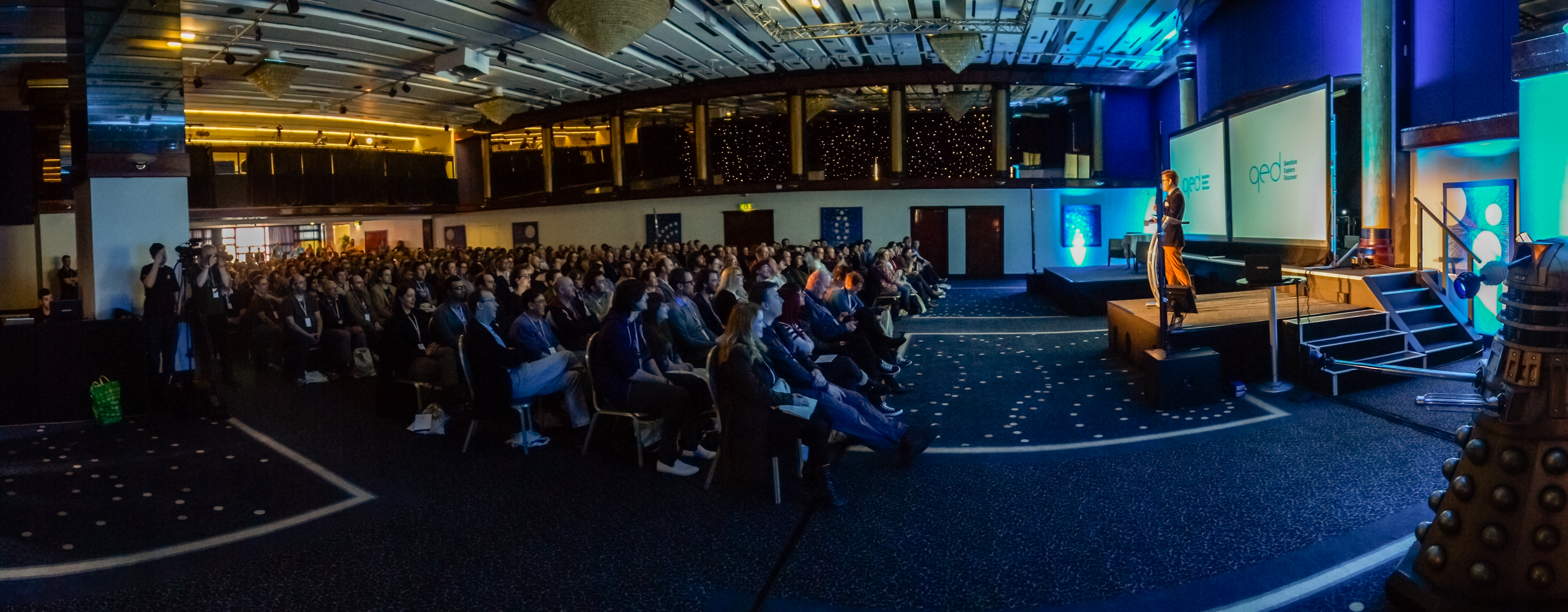
QED 2013 Panorama

Starting in February 2011 the Merseyside Skeptics Society, in conjunction with the Greater Manchester Skeptics Society, began organising and presenting an annual two-day sceptical science festival, QED: Question. Explore. Discover.

QED is organised by sceptics volunteers and any proceeds go back into the event or a charity. On the "Token Skeptic" podcast Michael Marshall said, "How we try to always pitch it and how we try and run it is – it's all about the skeptical community. Because its being run by people who are just part of that community who are doing this because we really love it, the atmosphere, seems to be, of people coming together. It's kind of a big party, a celebration of UK scepticism and also international scepticism".

In an article on the Committee for Skeptical Inquiry website about the first QED conference, Kylie Sturgess said, "The organisers of QEDCon didn't need to proclaim the success of their convention from the stage – it was evident from the beginning to the end."

== Board of directors ==
- President – Michael Marshall
- Vice President – Alice Howarth
- Treasurer/Secretary – Mike Hall
- Social Secretary – Rachel Waller
- Events Coordinator – Kat Ford
- Event Publicity - Phil Armstrong

== See also ==
- Association for Skeptical Enquiry
- Edinburgh Skeptics
- Richard Dawkins Foundation for Reason and Science
