= List of scientific skepticism organizations =

This is a list of notable organizations that promote or practice scientific skepticism.

== List ==
Name (English / local (abbreviation))	Founded	Region served	Notes
Association against Quackery / Vereniging tegen de Kwakzalverij (VtdK)	1881	Netherlands	Oldest skeptical organisation. Member of ECSO.
Association for Skeptical Enquiry (ASKE)	1997	United Kingdom	Member of ECSO.
Australian Skeptics	1980	Australia	
Center for Inquiry (CFI)	1991	World	Global umbrella organisation based in Amherst, New York.
Committee for the Advancement of Scientific Skepticism (CASS)	2010	Canada	Part of Centre for Inquiry Canada.
Committee for Skeptical Inquiry (CSI), formerly Committee for the Scientific Investigation of Claims of the Paranormal (CSICOP)	1976	United States	Part of the Center for Inquiry.
Committee Para / Comité Para	1949	Belgium	Member of ECSO. Serves Wallonia and Brussels.
Czech Skeptics Club Sisyfos / Český klub skeptiků Sisyfos (Sisyfos)	1995	Czech Republic	Member of ECSO.
Dakshina Kannada Rationalist Association / தட்சிண கன்னட பகுத்தறிவாளர் ஒன்றியம் (DKRA)	1976	India	Member of FIRA.
The Free Thought / De Vrije Gedachte (DVG)	1856	Netherlands	Focuses on atheism/secular humanism.
Edinburgh Skeptics Society (EdSkeptics)	2009	United Kingdom	
European Council of Skeptical Organisations (ECSO)	1994	Europe	A European umbrella organization, based in Roßdorf, Germany.
Federation of Indian Rationalist Associations / இந்திய பகுத்தறிவாளர் ஒன்றியங்களின் பேரவை (FIRA)	1997	India	Indian umbrella organisation.
Freedom From Religion Foundation (FFRF)	1978	United States	Focuses on state/church separation, nontheism, and atheism.
French Association for Scientific Information / Association française pour l'information scientifique (AFIS)	1968	France	Member of ECSO.
German Society for Fighting Quackery / Deutsche Gesellschaft zur Bekämpfung des Kurpfuschertums (DGBK)	1903	Germany	Dissolved in 1934.
Glasgow Skeptics	2009	United Kingdom	
Good Thinking Society	2012	United Kingdom	
Het Denkgelag	2012	Belgium	
Hungarian Skeptic Society / Szkeptikus Társaság (HSS)	2006	Hungary	Member of ECSO.
Independent Investigations Group (IIG)	2000	United States	
Indian CSICOP	19??	India	Affiliated with CSI, member of FIRA.
Indian Rationalist Association (IRA)	1949	India	Member of Rationalist International.
Irish Skeptics Society	2002	Ireland	Member of ECSO.
Italian Committee for the Investigation of Claims of the Pseudosciences / Comitato Italiano per il Controllo delle Affermazioni sulle Pseudoscienze (CICAP)	1989	Italy	Member of ECSO.
James Randi Educational Foundation (JREF)	1996	United States	
Launceston Skeptics	2010	Australia	
Maharashtra Committee for Eradication of Blind Faith / Maharashtra Andhashraddha Nirmoolan Samiti (MANS)	1989	India	Member of FIRA.
Merseyside Skeptics Society (MSS)	2009	United Kingdom	
MTÜ Eesti Skeptik (skeptik.ee)	2007	Estonia	
New England Skeptical Society (NESS)	1996	United States	Fusion of three earlier organisations.
New Mexicans for Science and Reason (NMSR)	1990	United States	
New Zealand Skeptics (NZ Skeptics)	1986	New Zealand	
Office for Science and Society (OSS)	1999	Canada	McGill University, Montreal.
Philippine Atheists and Agnostics Society (PATAS)	2011	Philippines	
Polish Skeptics Club / Klub Sceptyków Polskich (KSP)	2010	Poland	
Portuguese Skeptical Community / Comunidade Céptica Portuguesa (COMCEPT)	2012	Portugal	
Rational Alternative to Pseudoscience – Society for the Advancement of Critical Thinking / Alternativa Racional a las Pseudociencias – Sociedad para el Avance del Pensamiento Crítico (ARP-SAPC)	1986	Spain	Member of ECSO.
Rationalist Union / Union Rationaliste	1930	France	
Richard Dawkins Foundation for Reason and Science (RDFRS)	2006	UK & US	The American and British branches are independent.
Science and Popular Enlightenment / Föreningen Vetenskap och Folkbildning (VoF)	1982	Sweden	Member of ECSO.
Science and Rationalists' Association of India / Bharatiya Bigyan O Yuktibadi Samiti	1985	India	Based in Kolkata, West Bengal.
SKEPP	1990	Belgium	Member of ECSO. Serves Flanders and Brussels.
Skepsis ry	1987	Finland	Member of ECSO.
Skepsis Foundation / Stichting Skepsis (Skepsis)	1987	Netherlands	Member of ECSO.
Skeptical Circle / Círculo Escéptico (CE)	2006	Spain	Member of ECSO.
Skeptic Society / Общество скептиков	2013	Russia	
Skeptics in the Pub Online	2020	United Kingdom / World	
Society for the Scientific Investigation of Parasciences / Gesellschaft zur wissenschaftlichen Untersuchung von Parawissenschaften (GWUP)	1987	D-A-CH	Based in Roßdorf, Germany. Member of ECSO.
The Skeptics Society	1992	United States	Globally active, but mainly serves California.
Young Australian Skeptics (YAS)	2008	Australia	
Young Skeptics	2015	US	American after school program.

== See also ==
- Humanism
- Lists about skepticism
- List of books about skepticism
- List of secularist organizations
- List of skeptical conferences
- List of skeptical magazines
- List of skeptical podcasts
- List of notable skeptics
- Rationalism
