= List of scientific skepticism podcasts =

This is a list of notable podcasts that promote or practice scientific skepticism.

== Active ==
Podcast	Host(s)	Started	Language	Affiliation
Archaeological Fantasies	Sara Head, Kenneth Feder	January 5, 2015	English	The Archaeology Podcast Network
Be Reasonable	Michael Marshall (with Hayley M. Stevens until June 2014)	January 28, 2013	English	Merseyside Skeptics Society
Big Picture Science	Seth Shostak and Molly Bentley		English	SETI Institute
Dr Karl's Great Moments in Science	Karl Kruszelnicki	April 24, 2012	English	Australian Broadcasting Corporation, ABC Science
Friendly Atheist, The	Hemant Mehta, Jessica Bluemke	June 15, 2014	English	Independent
Geologic Podcast	George Hrab	January 23, 2007	English	Independent
InKredulous	Andy Wilson	February 8, 2010	English	Merseyside Skeptics Society
Little Atoms	Neil Denny, Padraig Reidy, Richard Sanderson, Becky Hogge	July 21, 2006	English	The Skeptic until 2011, now independent
MonsterTalk	Blake Smith, Ben Radford and Karen Stollznow	July 2, 2009	English	The Skeptics Society's Skeptic magazine (previously) independent, Monster House LLC (currently)
Ockham's Razor	Robyn Williams	January 23, 2016	English	Australian Broadcasting Corporation, Radio National
Oh No, Ross and Carrie!	Ross Blocher, Carrie Poppy	March 10, 2011	English	Maximum Fun
Pod Delusion, The	James O'Malley	September 18, 2009	English	British Humanist Association
Point of Inquiry	Leighann Lord, James Underdown	December 11, 2005	English	Center for Inquiry
Quackcast	Mark Crislip	May 5, 2006	English	Independent
Raising Freethinkers	Dale McGowan	December 7, 2018	English	Independent
Rationally Speaking	Massimo Pigliucci, Julia Galef	February 1, 2010	English	New York City Skeptics
Reality Check, The	Darren McKee, Adam Gardner, Elan Dubrofsky, Pat Roach, Christina Roach	August 14, 2008	English	Ottawa Skeptics
Saltklypa	Gunnar Tjomlid, Marit Simonsen, Kristin Carlsson	October 11, 2010	Norwegian	Independent
Science for the People	Desiree Schell	March 20, 2009	English	Independent
Skeptic Zone, The	Richard Saunders	September 26, 2008	English	Independent
Skeptics with a K	Mike Hall, Michael Marshall, Alice Howarth, Colin Harris	September 1, 2009	English	Merseyside Skeptics Society
Skeptics' Guide to the Universe, The	Steven Novella, Jay Novella, Robert Novella, Perry DeAngelis, Evan Bernstein, Rebecca Watson, Cara Santa Maria	May 4, 2005	English	New England Skeptical Society
Skeptoid	Brian Dunning	October 3, 2006	English	Skeptoid Media, Inc.
Squaring the Strange	Ben Radford, Pascual Romero, Celestia Ward	April 13, 2017	English	Independent
TheESP – European Skeptics Podcast	Pontus Böckman (SE), Annika Harrison (DE), András G. Pintér (HU)	November 18, 2015	English	Independent
Token Skeptic	Kylie Sturgess	December 25, 2009	English	Independent
Скептик (Skeptik)	Kirill Alferov, Levon Gulnazaryan, Ilya Makarov, Ekaterina Zvereva, Laida Kushnareva, Valery Sobolev	June 20, 2013	Russian	Skeptic Society (Общество скептиков)

== Inactive ==
These podcasts are either officially on hiatus, have ceased production, or have not produced an episode in over a year.

Podcast	Host(s)	Started	Ended	Language	Affiliation
15 Credibility Street	Sharon Hill	October 17, 2016	July 15, 2018	English	Doubtful News
Adam Ruins Everything	Adam Conover	May 24, 2016	March 7, 2018	English	Maximum Fun
Edinburgh Skeptics Presents...	Mark Pentler, Claudia Schaffner, David Frank + Other Guests	April 20, 2015	October 20, 2018	English	Edinburgh Skeptics
For Good Reason	D. J. Grothe	January 23, 2010	December 15, 2011	English	James Randi Educational Foundation
Hagtivist	Malik, Ros, Justice, Ato	January 19, 2020	February 20, 2020	English	Humanist Association of Ghana
Pseudoscientists, The	Jack Scanlan, Rachael Skerritt, Sarah McBride, Tom Lang, Belinda Nicholson	December 23, 2008	July 15, 2015	English	Young Australian Skeptics
Skeptically Yours	Emery Emery, Heather Henderson	July 29, 2012	November 4, 2017	English	Independent
Science Watch	Dave Thomas, M. Kim Johnson	August 13, 2005	March 7, 2010	English	New Mexicans for Science and Reason (NMSR)
Sisyphus Speaks: Reflections on Pseudo-Medicine	Mark Crislip	September 24, 2016	May 30, 2017	English	Society for Science-Based Medicine
Skepticality	Derek Colanduno, "Swoopy" Robynn McCarthy	April 1, 2005	January 18, 2018	English	The Skeptics Society's Skeptic magazine
Unfiltered Thoughts	Jack Scanlan	September 26, 2013	March 30, 2015	English	Young Australian Skeptics
VoFcast	Joacim Jonsson	April 6, 2011	January 21, 2012	Swedish	Vetenskap och Folkbildning

== See also ==
- List of books about skepticism
- List of notable skeptics
- List of notable debunkers
- List of skeptical conferences
- List of skeptical magazines
- List of skeptical organizations
- Lists about skepticism
