= COMCEPT =

Portuguese scientific skepticism project

Comunidade Céptica Portuguesa
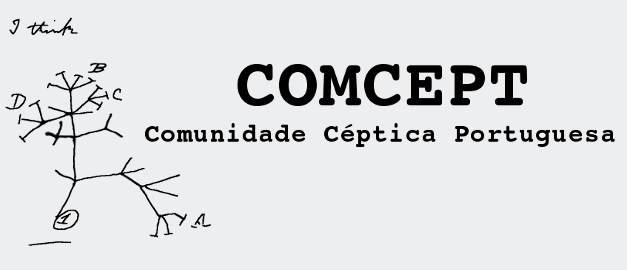
- COMCEPT's logo features Darwin's first tree of life sketch and the words "I think...".
- Abbreviation: COMCEPT
- Formation: 5 April 2012 (formalised in September 2016)
- Type: Nonprofit organisation
- Purpose: Promoting science, scientific skepticism and critical thinking
- Region served: Portugal
- President: Diana Barbosa
- Website: comcept.org

COMCEPT, acronym for Comunidade Céptica Portuguesa (English: Portuguese Skeptical Community), is a Portuguese project dedicated to scientific skepticism, created to promote rational and critical thinking about paranormal and pseudoscientific claims from a scientific point of view. Other subjects that are dealt with include conspiracy theories and disinformation that circulate in mass media or on social media. COMCEPT was founded on 5 April 2012 as a citizens' movement in Portugal. The citizens' movement was formally registered as a legal association in September 2016.

== History ==
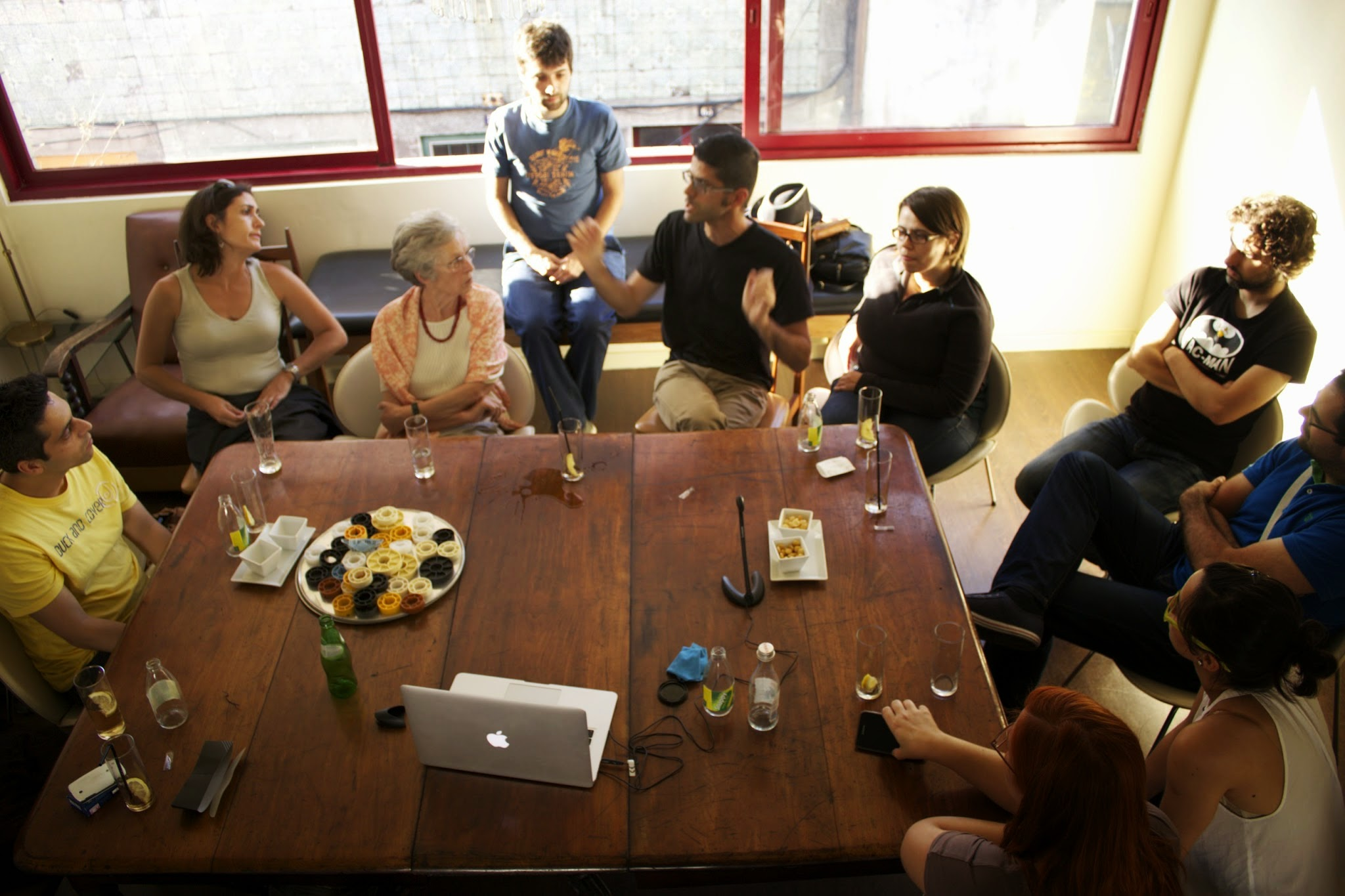
Cépticos com Vox, July 2013.

COMCEPT was founded on 5 April 2012 by a group of Portuguese citizens from differing origins and academic backgrounds. The foundation of this project was marked by a meeting between its founders and several collaborators in Coimbra. It began its activity with the launching of the official website and with the beginning of the monthly social gatherings, called "Cépticos com Vox" ("Skeptics with a Voice"). In November 2012, the group held its first national event, ComceptCon, in the village of Nazaré.

On 1 April 2013, COMCEPT awarded the Flying Unicorn Award for the first time for the year 2012.

On 15 November 2014, it first awarded the COMCEPT Prize at that year's ComceptCon to David Marçal.

== Objectives ==
The main goal of COMCEPT is the promotion of science, scientific skepticism, and critical thinking in the society.

== Activities ==
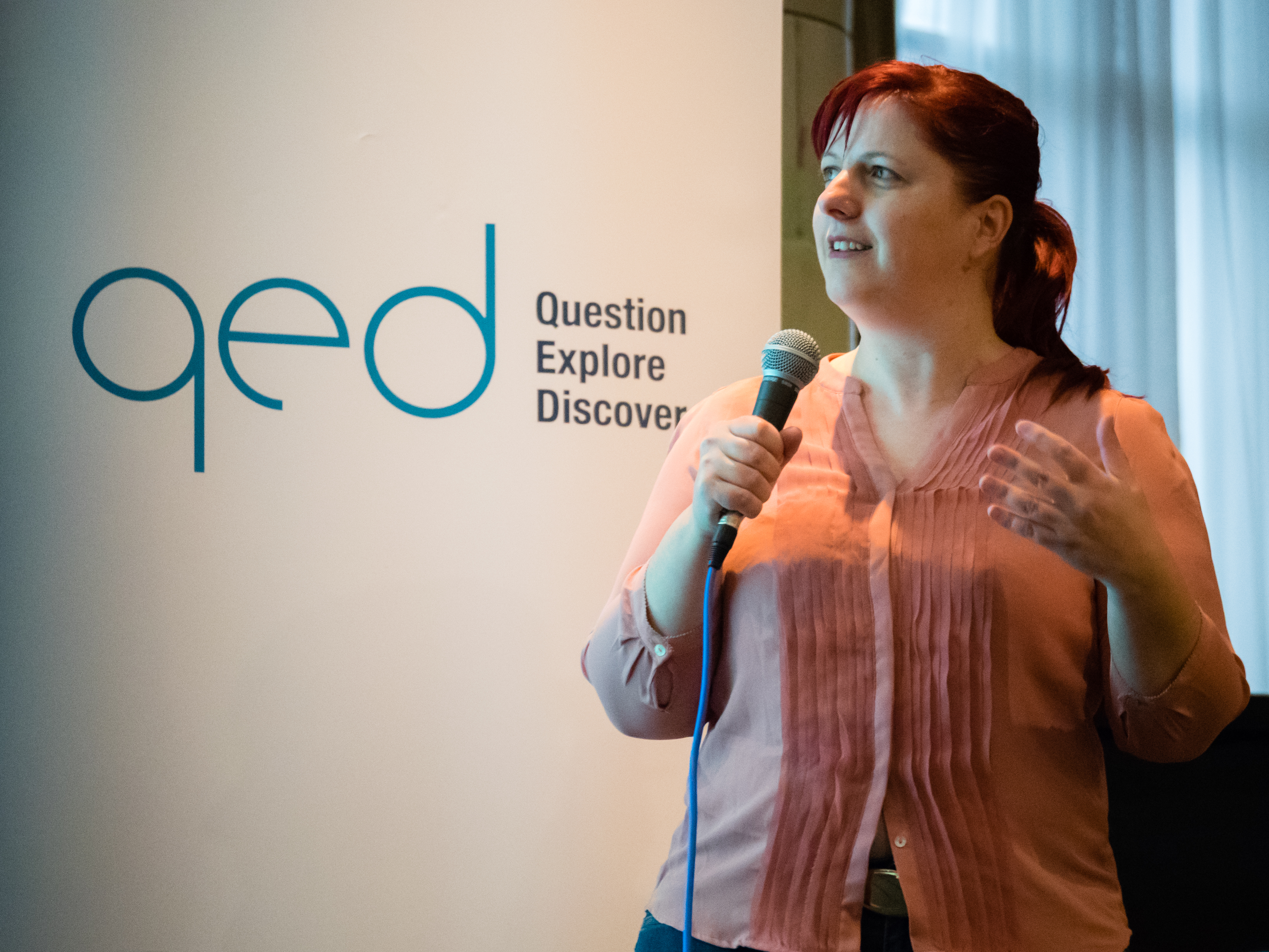
Diana Barbosa speaks at Question, Explore, Discover 2015 in Manchester.

=== Communication and education ===
COMCEPT publishes educational resources, news and opinion articles on the official website and social networks. In 2017, the association produced its first book: Não Se Deixe Enganar ("Don't Be Fooled").

=== Cépticos com Vox ===
COMCEPT holds monthly social gatherings that are open to the public. These are called "Cépticos com Vox" ("Skeptics with a Voice"), and they are similar to the international Skeptics in the Pub phenomenon. These meetings are usually dedicated to a specific theme and are characterised by an informal atmosphere. Usually, they take place alternately in Lisbon and Porto, although occasionally in other cities, such as Coimbra and Leiria, for example.

=== ComceptCon ===
ComceptCon is the association's annual conference dedicated to skepticism. It is an open-access event that includes lectures by invited experts with whom the public can interact.

=== Skeptics in the Museum ===
The association organises educational group visits to museums (Cépticos no Museu).

=== The Solstice Conference ===
The Solstice Conference is an open-access COMCEPT lecture presented by an invited expert, on the last Saturday before Christmas.

== Prizes awarded ==
=== Flying Unicorn Award ===
The Flying Unicorn Award is a satirical prize with the slogan "a happy prize for unhappy performances". This prize is attributed to personalities or entities which have disseminated pseudoscience, superstition and other forms of disinformation in Portugal. The aim is to stimulate reflection on the prevalence and influence of disinformation in society. Similar to the Pigasus Award from the James Randi Educational Foundation, it stands out because the nominees and winners are chosen by Internet users. The winners are revealed annually on April 1, April Fools' Day; they are selected from events that occurred during the previous year. Currently, there are three prize categories:

- Grafonola ("Gramophone") – For the media and its agents (press, radio, television, blogosphere).
- Estrela cadente ("Shooting Star") – For television stars and the artistic, sporting or social world.
- O Rei Está Nu ("The Emperor's New Clothes", literally "The King Goes Naked") – For all others who make or contribute to the propagation of doubtful allegations without evidence or against evidence.

==== Winners by category ====
Gramophone

- 2012: SIC
- 2013: Portugal Mundial
- 2014: RTP1
- 2015: i (Portuguese newspaper)
- 2016: SIC
- 2017: RTP1

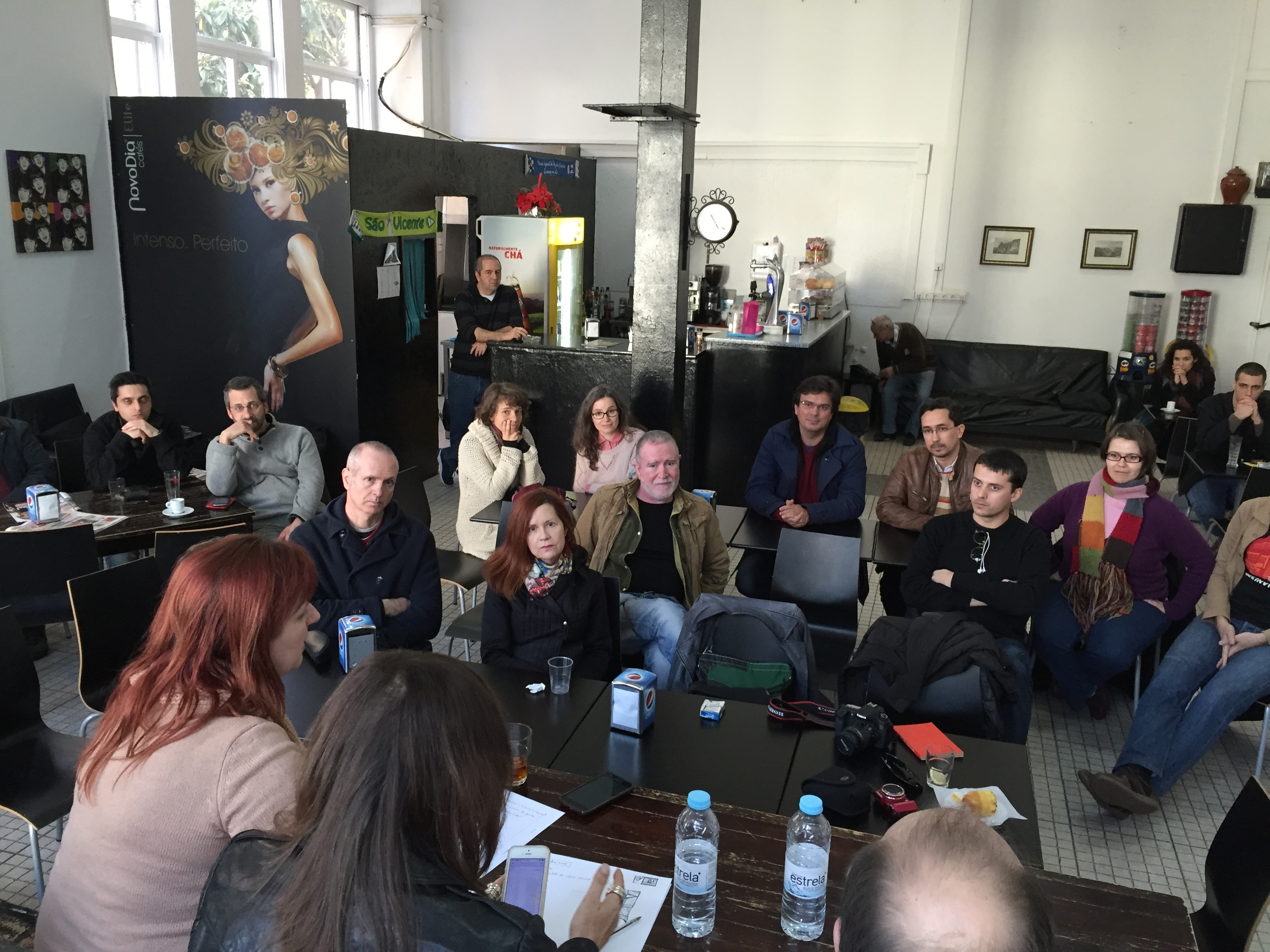
Meeting of Portuguese skeptics in Lisbon, February 2015.

Shooting star

- 2012: Fátima Lopes (television host)
- 2013: The morning crew on Rádio Comercial
- 2014: Gustavo Santos (television host)
- 2015: Simone de Oliveira
- 2016: (no nominees)
- 2017: Manuel Pinto Coelho

Emperor’s new clothes

- 2012: 2nd and 3rd Cycle of the Primary School of Arazede
- 2013: The Assembly of the Portuguese Republic
- 2014: Faculty of Pharmacy, University of Lisbon
- 2015: Academic institutions that intend to teach alternative therapies
- 2016: Higher School of Nursing of the Portuguese Red Cross from Oliveira de Azeméis (Conference about Esogetic Medicine)
- 2017: Faculty of Pharmacy of the University of Coimbra

Dom Quixote (discontinued category)

- 2012: Fundação Bial

=== COMCEPT Prize ===
The COMCEPT Prize awarded by the COMCEPT team to a personality who has excelled in the promotion of critical thinking and science in Portugal. The aim is to reward those who strive for a more enlightened society. This prize is not awarded annually, but only on special occasions when the association deems it necessary to highlight an exceptionally good example.

==== Awardees ====
- 2014: David Marçal

== Book ==
- Diana Barbosa, Leonor Abrantes, Marco Filipe & João Lourenço Monteiro, Não Se Deixe Enganar (2017)
