= Glasgow Skeptics =

Organization

- Formation: November 2009; 16 years ago
- Type: Nonprofit organisation
- Legal status: Society
- Purpose: Promotion of public understanding, critical thinking and freedom of speech
- Location: Glasgow
- President: Brian Eggo
- Website: glasgowskeptics.com

Glasgow Skeptics is a skeptical organisation based in Glasgow, Scotland. It aims to promote public understanding of science, critical thinking, and freedom of expression.

== History ==
Founded by Ian Scott, Glasgow Skeptics, aided by the Glasgow Brights, held their inaugural "Glasgow Skeptics in the Pub" Meetup on 10 November 2009.

== Activities ==
=== Skeptics in the Pub ===
Since the foundation of the Glasgow Skeptics in November 2009, its Skeptics in the Pub events have become increasingly popular. In March 2010, when Simon Singh lectured about his book Trick or Treatment and the British Chiropractic Association v Singh case, about 65 people attended the monthly meeting. In October 2014, Professor Helen Sang from The Roslin Institute of the University of Edinburgh gave a presentation titled "Would You Eat a GM Chicken?" on the ethics and hazards of genetically modified food in feeding a growing population. During the 5th anniversary of Glasgow Skeptics in the Pub on 10 November 2014, LGBT, atheist and secularist activist Nate Phelps talked about his past experience in the Westboro Baptist Church, his escape from it and his efforts for Recovering from Religion.

In recent years they have stepped up the frequency of their events, with the aim of filling as many Monday nights as possible throughout the year. They have been assisted in this endeavour with an increasingly close relationship with Edinburgh Skeptics, and other Scottish Skeptics in the Pub groups.

=== Debates ===
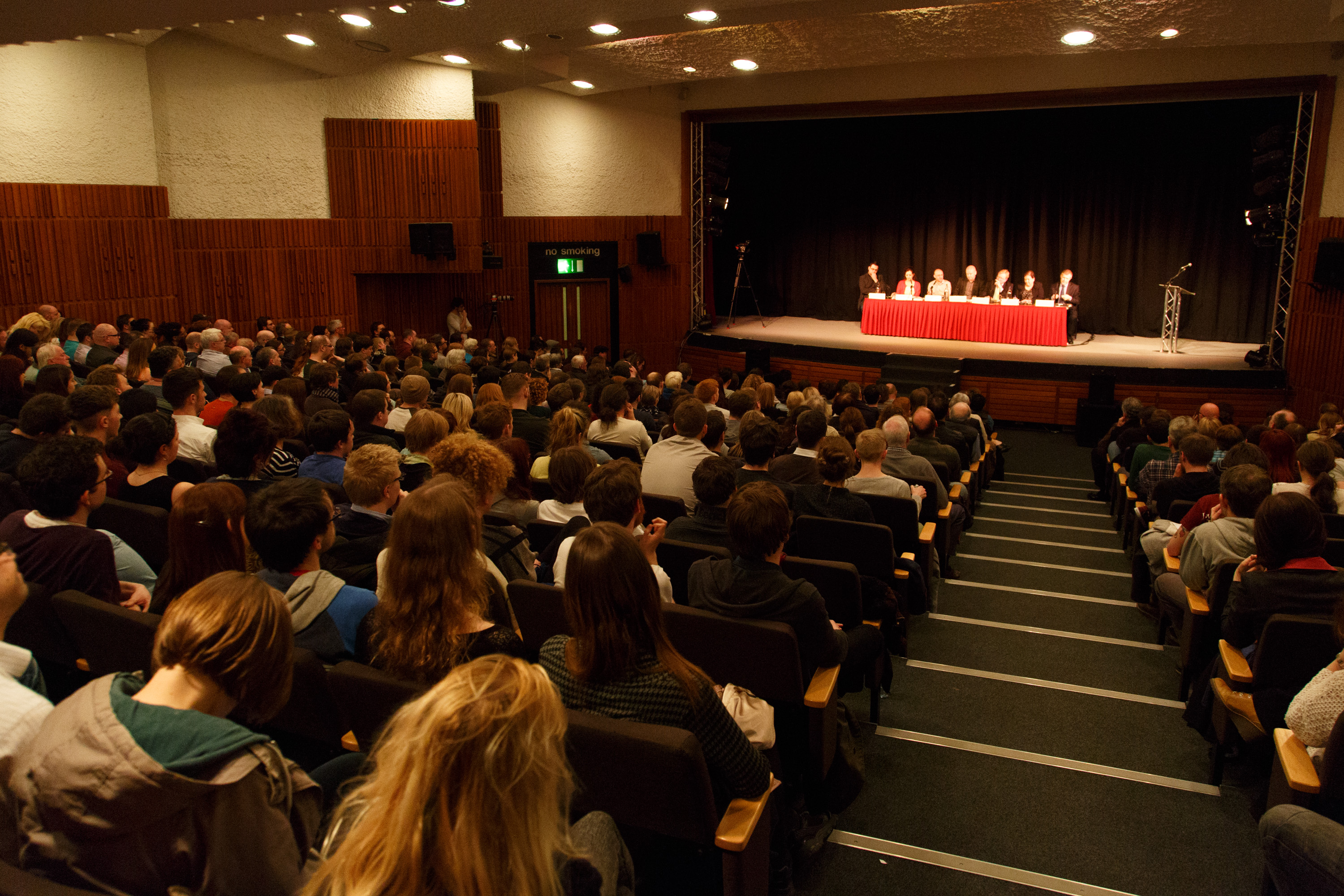
The 24 March 2014 Scottish independence debate.

As was as regular SITP talks, Glasgow Skeptics have hosted and organised a number of debates. Most notably discussions on Scottish independence before and after the 2014 referendum, and whilst the society itself officially remained "staunchly neutral" on the question, Guardian journalist Libby Brooks noted, and polls showed, a large majority of debate attendees was in the "Yes" camp. After "No" won, however, public commenters stressed that the referendum had "energised" the electorate, and further discussions should keep it focused on what "how, where and in what direction" Scotland should go now.

Glasgow Skeptics continue to organise and participate in debates, for events such as the EU Referendum, MSP and General Elections, and occasionally for other topics – including a debate with representatives from the Centre for Intelligent Design hosted by Glasgow University Christian Union.

=== Activism ===
Glasgow Skeptics have participated a number of initiatives over the years. In 2010, they were involved in the UK-wide 10:23 Campaign, initiated by the Merseyside Skeptics Society, by taking a mass 'overdose' of homeopathic pills to publicly demonstrate their inefficacy. In 2013, the Glasgow Skeptics launched a petition calling on the NHS Greater Glasgow and Clyde to cease funding the Glasgow Homoeopathic Hospital. In 2014 they took part in the Good Thinking Society's Psychic Awareness Month initiative.
