= List of scientific skeptics =

This is a list of notable people that promote or practice scientific skepticism. In general, they favor science and are opposed to pseudoscience and quackery. They are generally skeptical of parapsychology, the paranormal, and alternative medicine.

- James Alcock, psychologist. Author of several skeptical books and articles.
- Isaac Asimov, biochemist, author. Wrote or edited over 500 popular science, other nonfiction, and science fiction books, including the Foundation series. Founding member of CSICOP (now CSI).
- Robert A. Baker, psychologist, author. Wrote books on ghosts, alien abductions and false memory syndrome.
- Banachek, mentalist. participant in Project Alpha. Real name Steve Shaw.
- Stephen Barrett, psychiatrist. Cofounder of the National Council Against Health Fraud, critic of alternative medicine. Founder of the Quackwatch website.
- Barry Beyerstein, psychologist. Founding member of CSICOP (now CSI).
- Susan Blackmore, parapsychologist. Author, lecturer, and broadcaster.
- Maarten Boudry, philosopher and author.
- Derren Brown, mentalist, critic of alleged psychics and spiritual mediums.
- Robert Todd Carroll, philosopher. Author of The Skeptic's Dictionary book and website.
- Milbourne Christopher, magician. Founding member of CSICOP (now CSI).
- David Colquhoun, pharmacologist and author of the website Improbable Science.
- Brian Cox, physicist
- Narendra Dabholkar, author and the founder-president of Maharashtra Andhashraddha Nirmoolan Samiti.
- Richard Dawkins, evolutionary biologist and author known for promoting the gene-centric view of evolution (in his book The Selfish Gene), coining of the term meme, and atheist activism.
- Perry DeAngelis, co-founder and former executive director of the New England Skeptical Society, co-founder and former co-host of the Skeptics' Guide to the Universe podcast.
- Daniel Dennett, philosopher. Author of Darwin's Dangerous Idea: Evolution and the Meanings of Life and Breaking the Spell: Religion as a Natural Phenomenon.
- Jared Diamond, scientist, author and member of the editorial board of Skeptic.
- Ann Druyan, popular science author and current head of the Planetary Society. Widow of the astronomer Carl Sagan.
- Brian Dunning, writer and producer with focus on science and skepticism, host of Skeptoid podcast, as well as a Skeptoid spin-off video series, inFact, and producer of educational films on the subject of critical thinking.
- Mark Edward, formerly worked as an undercover psychic, currently exposes psychics and is the author of a tell-all book on that subject, member of editorial board of The Skeptics Society, invented the term Guerrilla Skepticism.
- Richard Feynman, theoretical physicist known for his work in quantum mechanics.
- Kendrick Frazier, Editor of the Skeptical Inquirer.
- Martin Gardner, author, recreational mathematician. Writer of the long-running 'Mathematical Games' column in Scientific American, and a longstanding columnist for the Skeptical Inquirer. Founding member of CSICOP (now CSI).
- Pamela L. Gay, astronomer, co-host of Astronomy Cast, assistant research professor in the STEM center at SIUE and project director for CosmoQuest.
- Susan Gerbic, the founder of Guerrilla Skepticism on Wikipedia which has the mission of improving the skeptical content of Wikipedia.
- Ben Goldacre, physician, journalist. Author of the "Bad Science" column in The Guardian (UK newspaper).
- David Gorski, surgical oncologist. A.k.a. Orac of Respectful Insolence. Critic of complementary and alternative medicine.
- Stephen Jay Gould, paleontologist, evolutionary biologist, historian of science, Harvard University.
- Natalie Grams, German physician, writer, scientific skeptic, former homeopath, author of Homeopathy Reconsidered — What Really Helps Patients (in German).
- Harriet A. Hall, physician, former US Air Force flight surgeon. Critic of alternative medicine and quackery.
- Sven Ove Hansson, philosopher. Founding Chairperson of the Swedish Skeptics (Vetenskap och Folkbildning) and Editor of the organisation's journal Folkvett.
- Sam Harris, neuroscientist and author.
- Sharon A. Hill, founder of Doubtful News, a news site that links synopses and commentary to original news sources, and provides information to critically assess claims made in the media. She is also producer and host of the 15 Credibility Street podcast.
- Christopher Hitchens, journalist and author.
- Douglas Hofstadter, physicist, artificial intelligence researcher. Author of Pulitzer Prize-winning book Gödel, Escher, Bach: The Eternal Golden Braid and Scientific American column "Metamagical Themas".
- Harry Houdini, magician. Critic of Modern Spiritualism who exposed fraudulent psychics and mediums and publicized their methods.
- George Hrab American skeptical musician, podcaster, speaker and emcee at The Amaz!ng Meeting
- Ray Hyman, psychologist, critic of parapsychology. Longstanding contributor to the Skeptical Inquirer. Founding member of CSICOP (now CSI).
- Jamie Hyneman, co-creator of the TV show MythBusters.
- Leo Igwe, Nigerian human rights advocate.
- Edward Jenner, English physician and scientist who pioneered smallpox vaccine.
- Penn Jillette, magician, half of Penn & Teller duo. Co-creator and co-host of the television series Bullshit!.
- Barry Karr, executive director for the Committee for Skeptical Inquiry
- Philip J. Klass, aerospace journalist. Known for his investigations of UFOs. Longstanding contributor to the Skeptical Inquirer. Founding member of CSICOP (now CSI).
- Paul Kurtz, philosopher, author. Founder of CSICOP (now CSI), Publisher of the Skeptical Inquirer.
- Leighann Lord, American comedian, writer, and actress.
- Scott Lilienfeld, professor of psychology, author, Consulting Editor for Skeptical Inquirer and Committee for Skeptical Inquiry Fellow
- Pat Linse, illustrator. Cofounder of the Skeptics Society, Copublisher and Art Director of Skeptic magazine. Creator of Junior Skeptic magazine.
- Daniel Loxton, illustrator, writer. Editor of Junior Skeptic magazine (bound into Skeptic magazine).
- Alan Melikdjanian, filmmaker, creator of the YouTube series Captain Disillusion which explains the use of visual effects in falsified videos.
- Tim Minchin, comedian, musician, actor. Has many songs illustrating his skepticism, most notably, "Storm".
- Rob Nanninga, writer and editor of Skepter.
- Joe Nickell, investigator of the paranormal, author. Columnist for the Skeptical Inquirer.
- Steven Novella, neurologist. Founder of the New England Skeptical Society and host of The Skeptics' Guide to the Universe podcast.
- James Oberg, aerospace journalist. Critic of UFOs and claims of a Moon landing hoax.
- Robert L. Park, physicist, and author of Voodoo Science.
- Massimo Pigliucci, professor of philosophy at City University of New York and co-host of the skeptical podcast, Rationally Speaking.
- Steven Pinker, Canadian experimental psychologist, cognitive scientist, linguist, popular science author, Harvard College Professor and advocate of evolutionary psychology and the computational theory of mind.
- Philip Plait, astronomer, author. Founder of the Bad Astronomy website.
- Massimo Polidoro, writer, journalist. Student of James Randi, co-founder and executive director of CICAP, Research Fellow of CSICOP (now CSI).
- Basava Premanand publisher of the Indian Skeptic magazine and chairman of the Indian CSICOP.
- Benjamin Radford, Managing Editor of the Skeptical Inquirer, co-host of Squaring the Strange podcast.
- James Randi, magician. Founder of the James Randi Educational Foundation. Notable for offering a million dollar cash reward for verifiable demonstration under laboratory conditions of any paranormal ability or event. Conceived and directed Project Alpha. Founding member of CSICOP (now CSI).
- Pascual Romero, co-host of the Squaring the Strange podcast, providing evidence-based analysis and commentary on a variety of paranormal topics.
- Emily Rosa, Guinness World Record youngest medical researcher; at age 11, published her study in the Journal of the American Medical Association on therapeutic touch, showing practitioners couldn't feel the "human energy field" when not looking.
- Carl Sagan, astronomer, popular science author, and media personality. Advocate for SETI, founder of the Planetary Society, host of the TV series Cosmos and author of The Demon Haunted World: Science as a Candle in the Dark. Founding member of CSICOP (now CSI).
- Cara Santa Maria, a science communicator, journalist, producer, television host, and podcaster. She currently is a co-host on The Skeptics' Guide to the Universe podcast, and hosts her own podcast Talk Nerdy.
- Richard Saunders, prior president of Australian Skeptics, host of the Skeptic Zone podcast
- Adam Savage, co-creator of the TV series MythBusters.
- Eugenie Scott, anthropologist. Executive Director of the National Center for Science Education (NCSE), critic of creationism and intelligent design.
- Robert Sheaffer, author. UFO investigator, columnist for the Skeptical Inquirer.
- Michael Shermer, historian, popular science author, founder of the Skeptics Society. Copublisher and Editor of Skeptic magazine. Also current writer for the Scientific American column "Skeptic".
- Simon Singh, popular British science author.
- Victor Stenger, physicist, philosopher, author of book Physics and Psychics: The Search for a World Beyond the Senses and many other books.
- Julia Sweeney, actress, comedian, author and performer of Letting Go of God.
- Jamy Ian Swiss, magician, co-founder of the National Capital Area Skeptics; co-founder of the New York City Skeptics; contributor to Skeptic magazine; co-producer and on-stage host of Northeast Conference on Science and Skepticism. on board of San Diego Association for Rational Inquiry (aka San Diego Skeptics).
- Raymond Teller, magician, half of Penn & Teller duo. Co-creator and co-host of the television series Bullshit!.
- Marcello Truzzi, sociologist. First editor of the Skeptical Inquirer. Critic of organized skepticism. Founding member of CSICOP (now CSI).
- Rebecca Watson, founder of Skepchick blog.
- Richard Wiseman, psychologist.
- Paul Zenon, magician and comedian.

== See also ==
- Humanism
- List of notable debunkers
- Lists about skepticism
- List of books about skepticism
- List of skeptical conferences
- List of skeptical magazines
- List of skeptical organizations
- List of skeptical podcasts
- Rationalism
