= Margaret M. Perry =

British molecular geneticist and embryology researcher

Margaret M. Perry (1930-2009) was an English molecular geneticist and embryology researcher at the University of Edinburgh whose research produced the first warm-blooded animal developed completely in vitro.

== Early life ==
Margaret Mary Perry was born in Stockton-On-Tees and educated at St Joseph's Catholic College in Bradford, where a headmistress had established a science laboratory. Perry's father was a civil engineer and her mother gained her degree from the University of Manchester in 1923.

== Career in Edinburgh ==
Perry graduated with a BSc in Pure Science (Genetics) from the University of Edinburgh in 1952. She went on to work as a research assistant at the University's Institute of Animal Genetics and published research on the embryology of amphibians with the Institute's director C.H. Waddington. In 1975-76 she joined the Agricultural Research Council's Poultry Research Centre in Edinburgh, which later became part of the Roslin Institute.

In 1988 Perry inserted foreign genetic material into single cell chicken embryos and cultured them to hatching "to produce the chick without its own egg shell", thus creating the first warm-blooded animal developed completely in vitro. In 1993 Perry and Helen Sang collaborated to create the world's first genetically engineered cockerel by gene injection.

Perry spoke at a number of international conferences, including in Poland and Japan. She also worked in France on electron microscope techniques.

== Personal life ==
After her retirement she visited Nepal, Australia, Egypt and the Galápagos Islands and walked frequently in the Highlands and Islands.

Margaret Perry was a devout Catholic and regularly provided religious services to patients at the Royal Edinburgh Hospital and Astley Ainslie Hospital. She was a member of the St Vincent de Paul Society.
