= List of scientific skepticism conferences =

This is a list of notable conferences that promote or practice scientific skepticism.

Event	Established	City	Country	Notes
Apostacon	2009	Various	United States	450+ attendees (2014).
Australian Skeptics National Convention	1985	Various	Australia	Organised by the Australian Skeptics. 320 attendees (2012).
CSICon / CFI Summit	1983	Various	United States	Sponsored by the Committee for Skeptical Inquiry and the Center for Inquiry.
European Skeptics Congress (ESC)	1989	Various	Europe	Sponsored by the European Council of Skeptical Organisations (ECSO) since 1994.
Freethought Festival	2012	Madison, Wisconsin	United States	Organized by Atheists, Humanists, & Agnostics at the University of Wisconsin-Madison.
Het Denkgelag	2012	Ghent/Antwerp, Flanders	Belgium	Independent. 1,000 attendees (Ghent 2013), 2,000 attendees (Antwerp 2015).
New Zealand Skeptics Conference	1986	Various	New Zealand	Organised by the New Zealand Skeptics. 120 attendees (2007).
Northeast Conference on Science and Skepticism (NECSS)	2009	New York City	United States	Organised by New York City Skeptics, New England Skeptical Society & Society for Science-Based Medicine. 400 attendees.
QED: Question, Explore, Discover	2011	Manchester, England	United Kingdom	Organised by the Merseyside Skeptics Society and the Greater Manchester Skeptics Society. 650 attendees (2016).
SkepchickCON	2009	Bloomington, Minnesota	United States	The scientific skepticism track at CONvergence, a 4-day science fiction and fantasy conference held annually in Bloomington Minnesota on the first full weekend in July.
SkepKon (GWUP-Konferenz)	1987	Various	Germany	Organised by the Gesellschaft zur wissenschaftlichen Untersuchung von Parawissenschaften.
Skepsis Congres	1987	Utrecht	Netherlands	Sponsored by Stichting Skepsis. 400 attendees (2011).
Skeptic's Toolbox	1992	Eugene, Oregon	United States	Founded by Ray Hyman, sponsored by the Center for Inquiry.
SkeptiCamp	2007	Various	Various	Organised by various local groups.
Skepticon	2008	Springfield, Missouri	United States	Founded as a student-run event at the Missouri State University. Later became independent. 1,500 attendees (2012).
Skeptics in the Pub (SitP)	1999	Various	Various	Organised by various local groups.
Skeptics on the Fringe (SotF)	2010	Edinburgh, Scotland	United Kingdom	Sponsored by the Edinburgh Skeptics.
SkepTrack	2008	Atlanta	United States	Part of the science fiction / fantasy conference Dragon Con.
SSAcon	2000	Columbus, Ohio	United States	The annual student conference of the Secular Student Alliance.
The Amaz!ng Meeting (TAM)	2003	Las Vegas, Nevada	United States	Sponsored by the James Randi Educational Foundation. 1,000+ attendees (2014).

== See also ==
- Humanism
- Lists of skepticism topics
- List of books about skepticism
- List of skeptical magazines
- List of skeptical organizations
- List of skeptical podcasts
- List of notable skeptics
- Rationalism
