= Scottish Science and Technology Roadshow =

The Scottish Science and Technology Roadshow (SCI-FUN), is a non-profit science roadshow for schools run by the University of Edinburgh.

The organisation states its aim as 'increasing enjoyment of and participation in science and technology-based subjects in Scottish schools' and operates mainly at Standard Grade level. It operates a travelling roadshow which visits schools in Scotland and the north of England, and organises special events such as at the Edinburgh International Science Festival. Its mode of operation as a travelling roadshow enables SCI-FUN to provide a science centre experience to pupils in remote areas of Scotland, such as the Highlands and Islands.

== SCI-FUN Roadshow ==
The SCI-FUN Roadshow tours secondary schools around Scotland offering a combination of presentations and hands-on exhibits encompassing scientific subjects in the fields of biology, chemistry, physics, maths, engineering and technology. The Roadshow is presented to S1 and S2 pupils (11-14 years old) with assistance from senior pupils studying sciences at Higher or Advanced Higher level.

The 2010/11 Roadshow includes presentations focusing on the senses and research, along with a talk encouraging pupils to consider the study of science subjects at Standard Grade. Current research at the University of Edinburgh is also covered in collaboration with FUSION; information on research in stem cells, the Large Hadron Collider, the Highland midge and Carbon Capture and Storage technology is currently included. In previous years, talks have discussed Climate change, the chemistry of the stars and survival.

There are around forty-five hands-on exhibits included in the Roadshow to allow pupils to have a go at a number of scientific experiments in a short time.

== SCI-FUN Primer ==
SCI-FUN Primer states its aims as 'explaining to upper primary school children that science is something that is all around them' and is aimed at primary school pupils P6 and P7 (age 9–12). SCI-FUN Primer is based on the hands-on part of the main SCI-FUN Roadshow programme, with activities scaled down so it fits within a classroom environment. This may be hosted by an associated secondary school.

== SCI-FUN at Science Festivals ==
=== Edinburgh International Science Festival ===
SCI-FUN have a presence at the Edinburgh International Science Festival which is held every year in Edinburgh over the Easter holidays. Elements of the SCI-FUN Roadshow are incorporated into the Science Festival programme, including exhibits and presentations. In 2011, as previous years, SCI-FUN was at Adam House on Chambers Street. They also presented their Senses show for the general public.

=== Hebridean Science Festival 2011 ===
SCI-FUN took part in the Hebridean Science Festival in 2011. The festival is run by ESTEEM (Engineering, Science, Technology, Employability, Enterprise, Mathematics), which is based in Stornaway and aims to inspire the next generation of scientists, engineers, technologists and mathematicians from the Western Isles. SCI-FUN ran their usual Roadshow for Hebridean schools, as well as hosting an evening session and a drop-in session for the general public. Other guests at the Hebridean Science Festival include the Astronomer Royal for Scotland Professor John C Brown, Johnny Ball, the University of St Andrews, the Institution of Engineering and Technology, Mr Boom and the Stornoway Astronomical Society.

=== Other Science Festivals ===
SCI-FUN has previous attended other Science Festivals around Scotland, including in Shetland and Orkney, and plan to attend more.

== FUSION ==
FUSION (Focusing on University Science Interpretation and Outreach Needs) is the sister group of SCI-FUN that collaborates with research groups within the university to find ways to promote their science to a wider audience. FUSION projects also lead to new topical science materials and exhibits, some of which have already been incorporated within the SCI-FUN Roadshow.

=== CCS Interactive ===
A major project of FUSION has been to produce the CCS Interactive (Carbon Capture and Storage Interactive) exhibit, with funding from the EPSRC. The CCS Interactive is a working model of Carbon Capture and Storage and has been developed alongside the Schools of Engineering and GeoSciences at the University of Edinburgh. The CCS Interactive can be used to demonstrate the process of Carbon Capture and Storage to school and public audiences. The CCS Interactive consists of a model of a fossil fuel burning power station with CO_{2} being introduced into the system using a gas cylinder. There are two carbon capture columns, filled with high surface area zeolites which CO_{2} adsorbs to. Directions of gas flow and CO_{2} content of gas emissions are indicated using LEDs, and water vapour is used to simulate the gas emissions from the power station.

== History of SCI-FUN ==
SCI-FUN started out as FUNdamental Physics in the early 1990s. This was a small scale, volunteer-run show focusing on talks about the physical sciences. This was expanded and in 1999 became SCI-FUN in its current form, incorporating the hands-on exhibits about all the sciences and touring the whole of Scotland. A pilot project involved the hiring of equipment from the National Science-Technology Roadshow Trust in New Zealand.

The Roadshow has evolved over time, increasing collaboration with researchers at the University of Edinburgh and responding to changes in the school curriculum.

== Previous SCI-FUN Projects ==
=== PP4SS ===
Since 2004, Alan Walker from the Department of Physics at the University of Edinburgh has led the PP4SS (Particle Physics for Scottish Schools) project, funded by the PPARC. This is a workshop activity aimed at senior secondary school pupils which has been used at school visits, university functions, the Edinburgh International Science Festival and at Scottish Parliament events. The PP4SS team visited CERN as part of its 50th Anniversary celebration, along with Professor Peter Higgs who theorised the existence of the Higgs boson.

=== LERU ===
In 2005 and 2006, SCI-FUN organised and ran the University of Edinburgh's part of the Europe-wide LERU Kids' University programme. This programme aimed to allow secondary school pupils to experience the university environment at an early stage.

=== Work experience placements ===
Previously, SCI-FUN has taken on S5 and S6 pupils for work experience placements. One week work experience places were offered to pupils to either travel out to schools with the Roadshow, or to work in the office developing exhibits or shows. In the past, pupils have also been offered a chance to apply for a bursary from the Nuffield Foundation for a six-week placement to work on exhibits for PP4SS.

== See also ==
- List of science centers#Europe
