= Launceston Skeptics =

Australian-based skepticism organization

- Formation: 27 February 2010
- Type: Nonprofit organisation
- Region served: Launceston, Tasmania
- President: Jin-oh Choi
- Website: launcestonskeptics.com

The Launceston Skeptics is a nonprofit organisation that promotes scientific skepticism in Launceston, Tasmania. Founded in 2010 by Jin-oh Choi through a meetup group, the organisation has participated in community events, challenged the claims of ghosts, and hosts regular meetups in Launceston. Their mission is to encourage the media to adopt a more critical outlook, encourage scientific knowledge and address questions about human rights and social issues.

== Outreach ==
In 2011, soon after its founding, the Launceston Skeptics decided to get a stall at a 'Mind Body Spirit' conference. They suspected that they would not be allowed to attend as they were such a dramatic contrast to the other people who would have stalls. They approached the organizer and were very upfront about what they wanted to do. They showed her what they planned on handing out and talked about their code of ethics. The organizer was perfectly fine with their attendance. She stated that if someone had a problem with skeptics being at the event, then that was their problem. The skeptics decided that they would always have two people at the table at all times and worked in 4-hour shifts over the three days, which lasted from 9am - 6pm.

Their mission was to try to get people to think a bit about the claims that were made at the venue: "Keep your bulldust(sic) detector in good order," according to spokesman David Tyler. They designed and handed out small flyers for many different topics. They started with "A thinker's guide to ..." and provided something a reader could get through in 30 seconds. They had more references to give the person if they were interested in learning more. Their idea was to create an "Island of reason in a sea of rainbows and unicorns."

Much to their surprise, they bonded with people at the stalls around them, and learned a lot watching hour after hour of how the other exhibitors marketed their wares and skills. They did not receive any hostility and had some great conversations with attendees. One encounter they chalked up for a win was when a mother came to their table and read their literature on homeopathy. She asked a few questions and then told them she had just purchased a homeopathic whooping cough vaccine. She returned to the booth where she bought it to get her money back.

After the event, they received double the number at their next meetup event. The skeptics hope to return to the festival year after year.

In 2013, as a part of National Science Week, the Launceston Skeptics showed the 40-minute documentary Here Be Dragons by Brian Dunning. Choi says that the reason this is so important to show at this time is because the government reported that Australians lost over $93 million last year to scams. This documentary is a "gentle introduction to critical thinking ...as we all have a natural need to believe things."

The Launceston Skeptics have sponsored speakers such as atheist lecturer Peter Boghossian and skeptical activist Susan Gerbic.

=== Ghost hunting ===
In 2013 the TAS Ghost Hunting Society spent 4-hours investigating the Launceston Franklin House. They used EVP recorders, SP-7 spirit box and other various paraphernalia common to modern ghost hunting groups. To ABC news they announced that they found unexplained cold spots, and photographed shadows as well as recorded noises that when played back they said it was spirits saying the names "Will" and "Rachael", the TAS groups states that there were several people named "William" associated with the building, including the man who established the boarding school. The TAS conclusion is that '"The place isn't haunted, but it does have paranormal activity"'. When the Launceston skeptics were asked, they reported that they did not find any of TAS's "evidence" compelling. According to Choi, the ghost team has not reported how they set up their equipment, how are they sure they didn't record or photograph themselves? Skeptic spokesman David Tyler responded "'It has to be good, if it's an extraordinary claim, that is that there are ghosts there it needs very solid evidence.'" The skeptics have asked to be included in future TAS ghost hunting excursions.

The Launceston Paranormal Society (LPS) has thought about inviting the Skeptics to help them with their investigations into paranormal activity. Choi has stated that they would welcome the opportunity, he thinks that LPS is trying to approach ghost hunting scientifically, appreciating the importance of scientific evidence. "We try not to make assumptions based on unknown information."

According to investigator Benjamin Radford most ghost hunting groups... make many methodological mistakes.... In his article for Skeptical Inquirer Radford concludes that ghost hunters should care about doing a truly scientific investigation "I believe that if ghosts exist, they are important and deserve to be taken seriously. Most of the efforts to investigate ghosts so far have been badly flawed and unscientific --- and, not surprisingly, fruitless."

=== Religious demographics ===
After the 2011 release of the Australian census, it was reported that in Australia people who claimed to hold religious beliefs is dropping. In Tasmania the percentage of people reporting no-religion, when asked, has risen to 29 percent. ABS director of social and progress, Fiona Dowsley stated that half the people reporting no-religion are under the age of 30, and highly educated. Choi when asked about the statistics, was not surprised. He stated that '"Most people are starting to realise religion doesn't offer them too much and as they see they only have one opportunity in life rather than waste it on religion it's important to cherish the time we've got."'

=== Doomsday ===
At the end of 2012, Choi was asked his thoughts about the anticipated end-of-the-world Mayan calendar scare. Choi responded that there have been many doomsday predictions, none of which have come true. He states that this current apocalypse hype was brought on by "over-excited enthusiasts."

== Operations ==
As of October 2015 the Launceston skeptics meet three times a month. Skeptical Sunday meets on the 2nd Sunday of every month and Skeptics in the Pub meets on the 1st and 3rd Thursdays of every month. On July 3, 3013 the Launceston Skeptics became non-profit and are now known as Launceston Skeptics Inc. Member year runs July 1 to June 30 and dues are $20 per year.

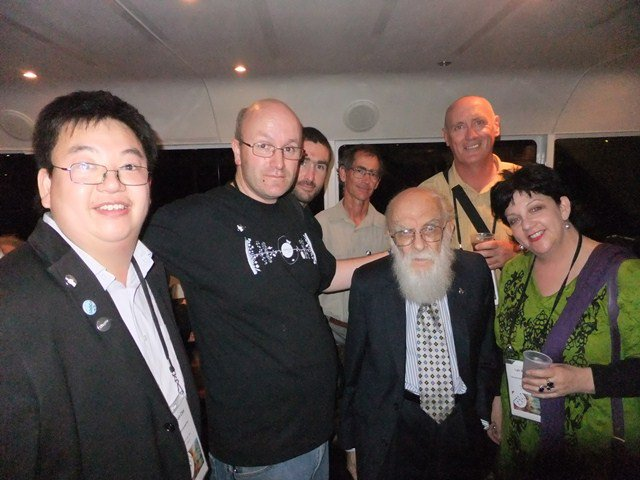
Launceston Skeptics with James Randi

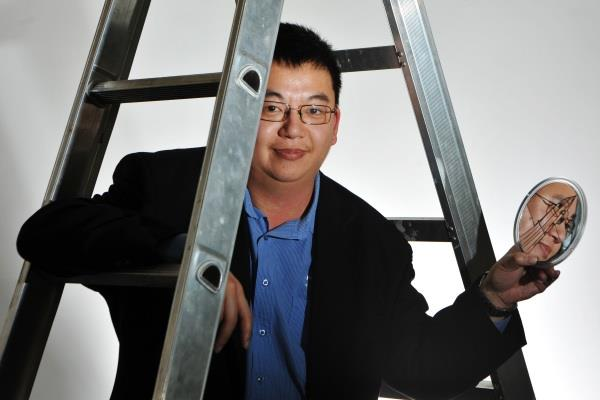
President and founder Jin-oh Choi at the Friday 13th event

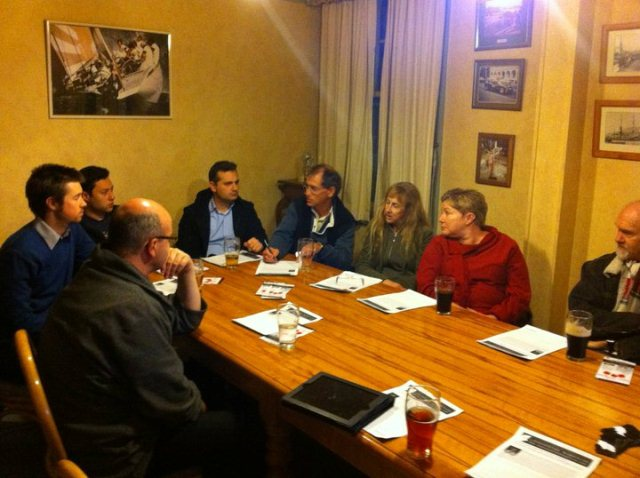
Skeptics in the Pub

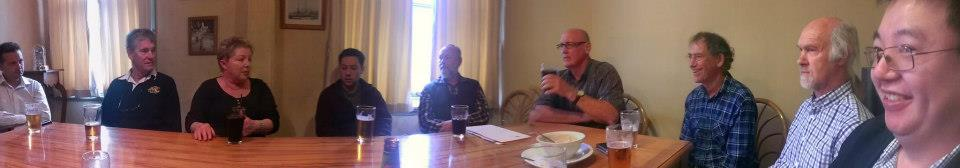
SitP Panorama

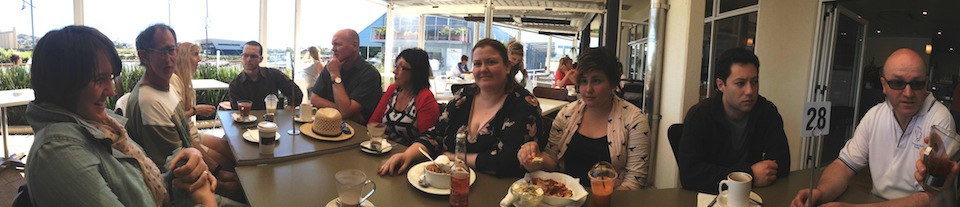
Skeptical Sunday Panorama

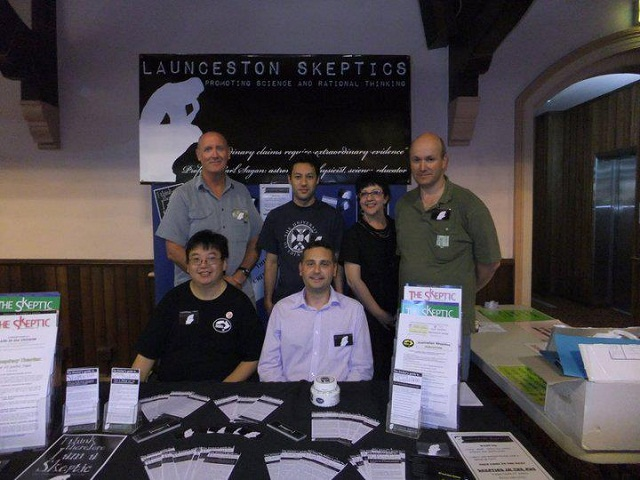
Body and Soul Festival 2011

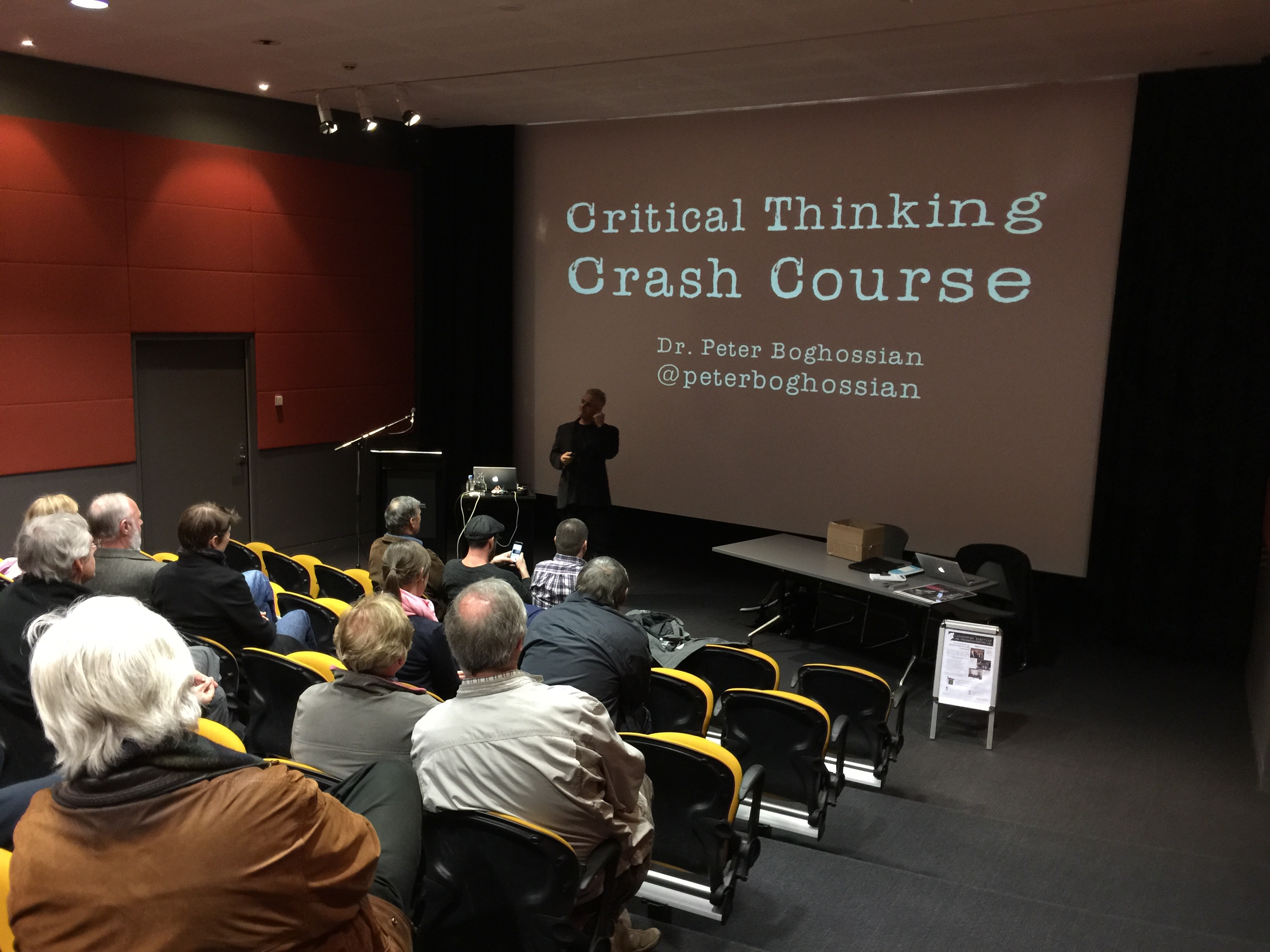
Peter Boghossian lecture 2015

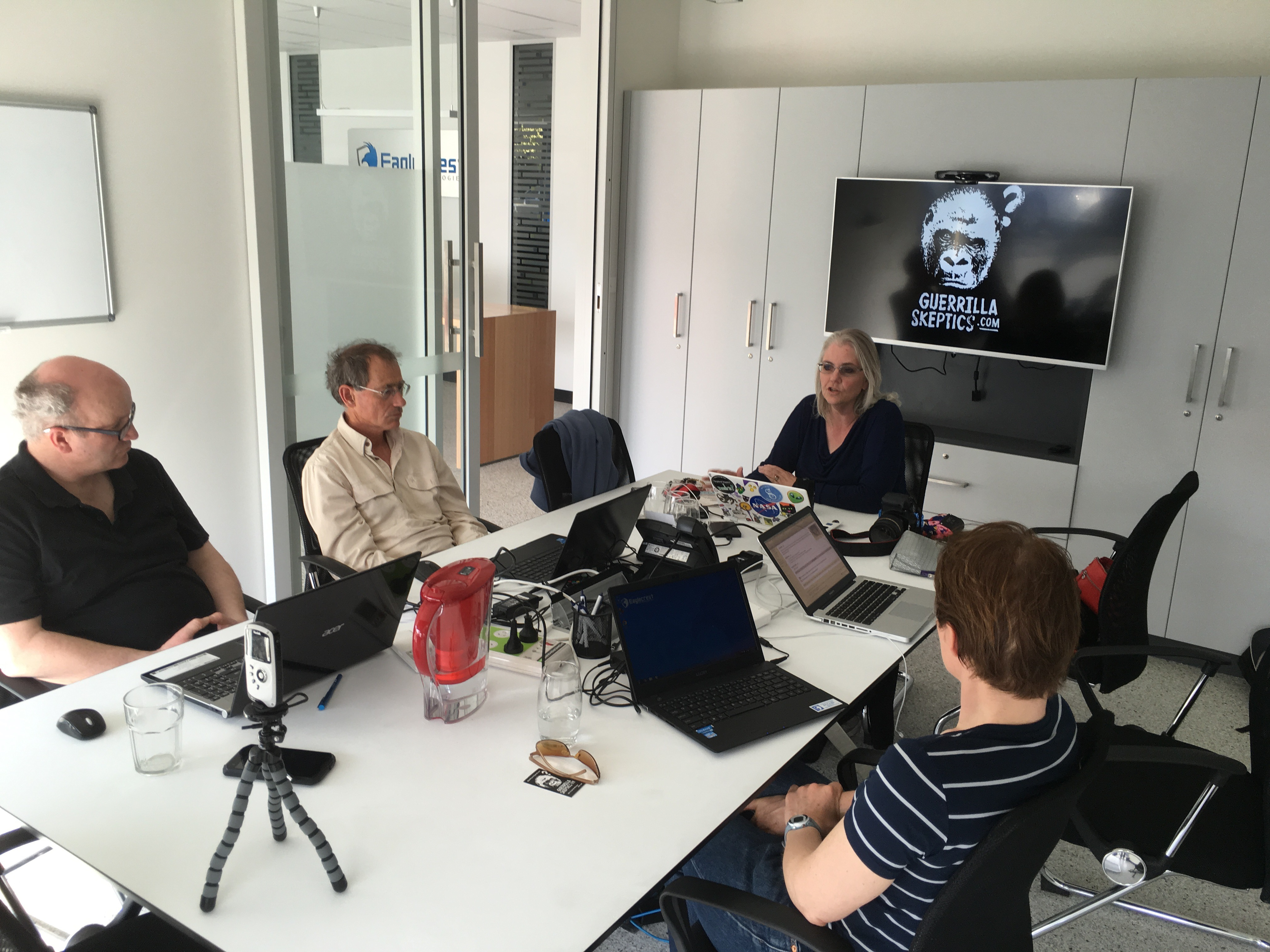
Susan Gerbic GSoW workshop Oct 2015
