= Young Skeptics =

American skeptical thinking organization

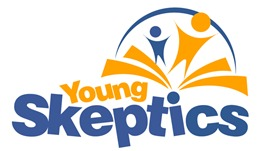
- Formation: 2015; 11 years ago
- Headquarters: 550 Latona Rd. Bldg D Suite 417, Rochester NY 14626
- Executive Director: Kevin Davis

Young Skeptics is an after school program sponsored by The Better News Club, Inc. (BNC), an incorporated nonprofit organization run by a board of directors consisting of unpaid volunteers. Young Skeptics' mission statement says “The mission of Young Skeptics is to promote and facilitate critical thinking and evidence-based learning among the youth of local school districts. We believe in discovery through tangible problem solving and the scientific method, and refrain from offering supernatural explanations for occurrences in nature. Young Skeptics is committed to teaching children how to think, not what to think.” It ran a pilot program for elementary school children in Monroe County, New York. Young Skeptics is undergoing national expansion. Its first remote chapter will begin in February 2017 in San Luis Obispo, California.

== History ==
Young Skeptics was formed after a group of parents in the Rochester, NY area became concerned by the presence of an evangelical Christian children's group, the Good News Club, at a Churchville-Chili elementary school. A group of Rochester atheists started this critical thinking club as an alternative to the faith based club.

== Activities ==
The club does not address debunking religion because "they are little kids and we don’t want to use the same tactics as the Good News Club by telling them what to think,” said Young Skeptic Director Kevin Davis, "Our focus is on science-based critical thinking." The first lesson focused on the difference between opinions and facts.

Lesson on Fact vs. Opinion for elementary kids

The next four lessons are Evidence, Reasoning & Communication, What is a scientist? and What is a skeptic?

== Legal issues ==
The Supreme Court decision Good News Club v. Milford Central School held that when a government operates a "limited public forum" it may not discriminate against speech that takes place within that forum on the basis of the viewpoint it expresses. The "limited public forum" in the case was referring to after school programs, that the schools provided space for, but was not run by the school.

== See also ==
- Center For Inquiry
- Katherine Stewart (journalist)
- List of skeptical organizations
