= Joan Davidson =

Scottish science educator (1977–2020)

Joan Yeats Davidson
- "fair use" image
- Born: 9 March 1977; Aberdeen
- Died: 27 November 2020 (aged 43); Edinburgh
- Education: University of Edinburgh
- Employer: Edinburgh Science
- Known for: Science and environmental educator

Joan Yeats Davidson (1977 – November 2020) was a Scottish science educator, environmentalist and the Head of Learning at Edinburgh Science.

== Early life and education ==
Davidson was born in Aberdeen, Scotland, to Charlie Davidson, a hospital theatre technician, and his wife Doreen, a primary school classroom assistant. A younger brother, Charles, was born two years later. She was educated in Aberdeen, at Byron Park Primary School and Westerton Primary School, and later Northfield Academy. She enjoyed sport and won school, regional and national trophies in badminton whilst at primary school. Whilst at Westerton Primary School, she was a cellist with Aberdeen Youth Orchestra and acted with Aberdeen Children's Theatre. At Northfield Academy Joan joined local environmental group Dear Life, which focused on the effect of fossil fuels. On leaving school in 1995 she studied Environmental Geosciences at the University of Edinburgh.

== Career ==
After graduating Davidson worked part-time running workshops for primary schools at Aberdeen Science Centre (then known as Satrosphere). But in 2001 she joined retailer HMV's graduate recruitment programme, working as a manager in stores in Scotland, Northern Ireland and the Republic of Ireland.

In 2008 she joined Edinburgh International Science Festival, later to become Edinburgh Science, as Generation Science Manager, running a programme of touring science workshops visiting primary schools around Scotland. She then became Head of Learning. In these roles she oversaw the expansion of Edinburgh Science's programme to become the largest science-based touring programme in the UK, reaching 60,000 pupils per year. In 2019 her programme called "Generation Science" planned to tour to deliver visits to 600 primary schools funded by ExxonMobil. Under Davidson's leadership the team also developed Careers Hive, which reached 3,000 pupils in 2020 at a life event at the National Museum of Scotland, Edinburgh. The programme featured workshops and advice from industry professionals on getting into careers in STEM (science, technology, engineering and maths). She also sought to break down barriers to engagement with science running programmes through community centres and similar organisations, running programmes such as Great Plate, a workshop focussing on health, wellbeing and nutrition.

She died from cancer in November 2020.

== Personal life ==
She and her partner Susan, who she met whilst working at HMV, lived in Edinburgh.
