= Irish Skeptics Society =

Organization

- Abbreviation: ISS
- Formation: December 2002; 23 years ago
- Type: Nonprofit organisation
- Purpose: Promoting science and critical thinking
- Headquarters: Blanchardstown, Dublin
- Region served: Ireland
- Chairman: Paul O'Donoghue
- Website: irishskeptics.org

The Irish Skeptics Society (ISS) is a scientific skeptical organisation based in Ireland. It was launched in December 2002 and publishes a newsletter called Skeptical Times. The ISS is a member of the European Council of Skeptical Organisations (ECSO).

The organisation regularly sponsors lectures on a variety of topics including self-awareness, tolerance, evolution and popularisation of science. In 2004, it sponsored a lecture by James Randi. It is a signatory to Sense about Science's Keep Libel Laws out of Science campaign.

Spokespersons from the organisation such as its founding member Paul O'Donoghue (a clinical psychologist) are often quoted on paranormal and pseudoscience topics such as homeopathy, magnet therapy, Spiral Dynamics and UFOs in the Irish press. Paul O'Donoghue has commented on the amount of coverage alternative medicine receives in the media.

The Irish Skeptics Society hosted the 13th European Skeptics Congress from 7 to 9 September 2007 at the Davenport Hotel in Dublin.
