= Lists of scientific skepticism topics =

Scientific skepticism (also spelled scepticism) is the practice of questioning whether claims are supported by empirical research and have reproducibility, as part of a methodological norm pursuing "the extension of certified knowledge". Scientific skepticism, or skepticism for short, manifests itself since the 20th century as a societal phenomenon involving several individuals and more or less organised groups through several different media, commonly referred to as "the skeptical movement". This is a compilation of the various lists about skepticism with articles in Wikipedia.

- List of books about skepticism
- List of notable skeptics
- List of notable debunkers
- List of prizes for evidence of the paranormal
- List of skeptical conferences
- List of skeptical magazines
- List of scientific skepticism organizations
- List of skeptical podcasts

== See also ==
- Lists of atheists
- List of topics characterized as pseudoscience
