= Deutsche Gesellschaft zur Bekämpfung des Kurpfuschertums =

German skeptical association

- Abbreviation: DGBK
- Formation: 1903
- Dissolved: 1934
- Type: Nonprofit organisation
- Purpose: Consumer protection against quackery
- Region served: Germany
- Members: 30,000 (1928)
- Founder: Carl Alexander
- Affiliations: Ärztlicher Vereinsbund, Deutsche Gesellschaft zur Bekämpfung der Geschlechtskrankheiten

The Deutsche Gesellschaft zur Bekämpfung des Kurpfuschertums (DGBK; English: German Society for Fighting Quackery) was a skeptical association founded in 1903 for consumer protection against quackery. It opposed the Kurierfreiheit ("Curing freedom", the right to treat illnesses without being medically educated), that existed in Germany from 1869/1872 until the adoption of the Heilpraktikergesetz ("Healers' Law") in 1939. The association originated after the example of the Deutsche Gesellschaft zur Bekämpfung der Geschlechtskrankheiten (DGBG; "German Society for Fighting Venereal Diseases"), and is counted as one of the predecessors of the Gesellschaft zur wissenschaftlichen Untersuchung von Parawissenschaften (GWUP).

== History ==
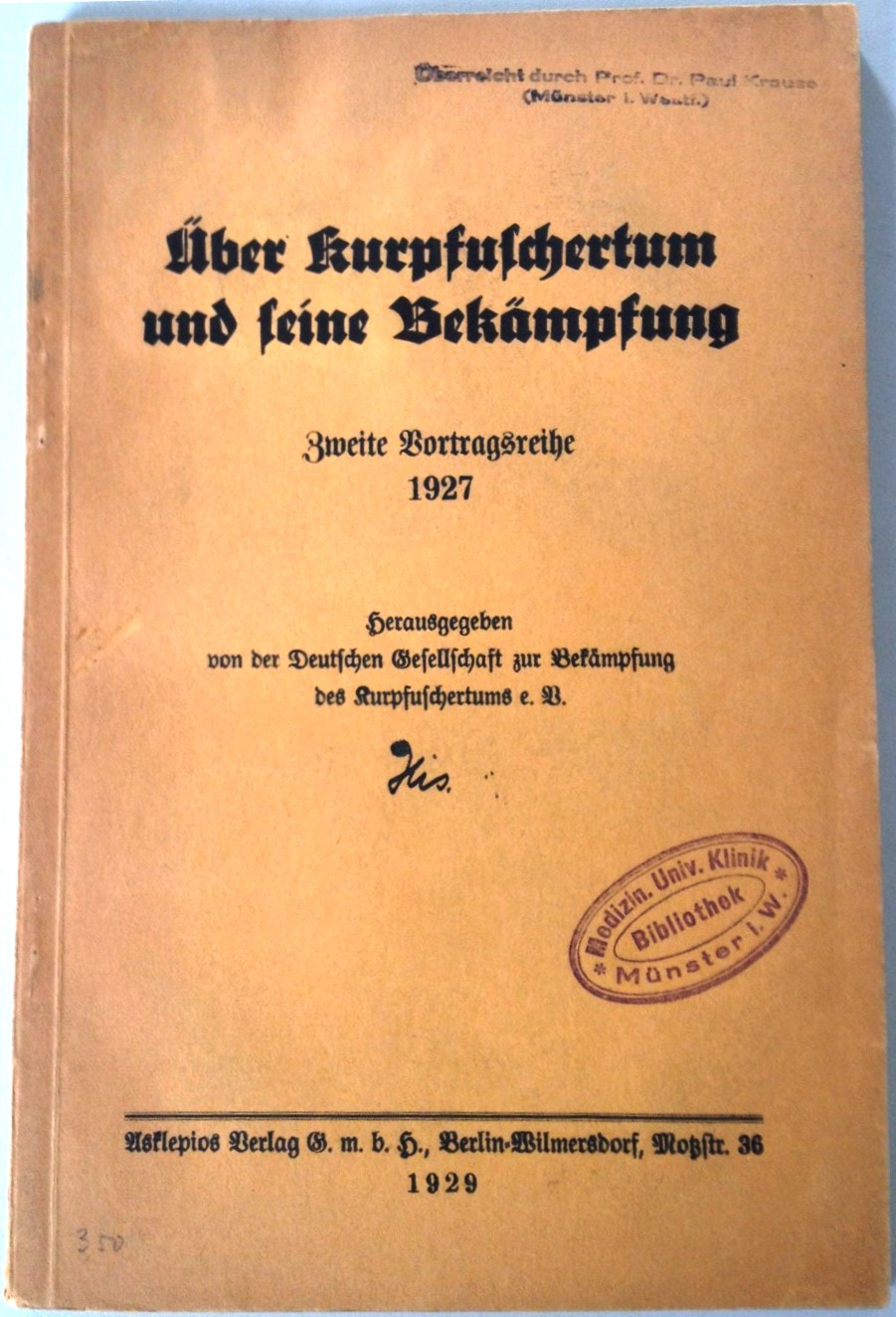
On Quackery and How To Fight It (1929), a book published by the DGBK.

Since 1899, there was a Quackery Commission in the umbrella organisation of physicians' associations, the Ärztlicher Vereinsbund. This led Carl Alexander to found the DGBK in 1903. After the first annual general assembly of 14 January 1904, the DGBK started providing information and cooperated on legislative measures, to which end several commissions were formed. With pamphlets and lectures, lay people as well as professionals were educated. There was lobbying against naturopathy, antivaxxers and also doctors who practised homeopathy. The association primarily sought to warn the public against unskilled lay healers. In 1911, the DGBK participated with the DGBG in the International Hygiene Exhibition of Karl August Lingner, the founder of Odol (a mouthwash brand), in Dresden, to which other organisations were demonstratively not invited. In response, in the summer of 1911 a counter-event was held entitled "Congress of Naturopathy and People's Welfare". The association managed to combine left and conservative forces alike and organise travelling exhibitions. In 1927, 53,000 paying visitors came to an exhibition in Ludwigshafen.

In 1929, the DGBK suggested creating a law against all forms of quackery, to provide legal prerequisites against people who offer medical treatment or obstetrics without appropriate education.

After the Nazi seizure of power in 1933, the magazine Gesundheitslehrer ceased publication in 1934 and the DGBK was dissolved.

== Publications ==
- Gesundheitslehrer: Zeitschrift gegen Mißstände im Heilwesen für Ärzte und Behörden. Magazine of the Deutschen Gesellschaft zur Bekämpfung des Kurpfuschertums (until 1934).
- Heinrich Kantor: Freie Bahn für die Kurpfuscher? Springer-Verlag, Berlin and Heidelberg 1917. ISBN 9783662424667.
- Über Kurpfuschertum und seine Bekämpfung. Zweite Vortragsreihe 1927. Asklepios-Verlag, Berlin 1929.
- Kurpfuschereiverbot auch in Deutschland: Eine für den 21. Reichstagsausschuß (Reichsstrafgesetzbuch) bestimmte Vorlage für einen Kurpfuschereiparagraphen des Strafgesetzbuches. Asklepios-Verlag, Berlin 1929.

== Literature ==
- Jens-Uwe Teichler: "Der Charlatan strebt nicht nach Wahrheit, er verlangt nur nach Geld": Zur Auseinandersetzung zwischen naturwissenschaftlicher Medizin und Laienmedizin im deutschen Kaiserreich am Beispiel von Hypnotismus und Heilmagnetismus. Franz Steiner Verlag, 2002. ISBN 9783515079761. p. 171f.
