= Skeptic Society =

Organization

Общество скептиков Skeptic Society
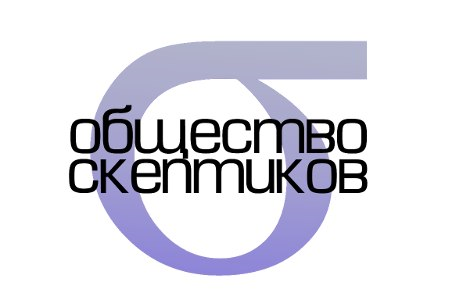
- Formation: 2013; 13 years ago
- Type: Nonprofit organization
- Headquarters: Moscow
- Location: Russia
- Region served: Russian-speaking world
- Chairman: Kirill Alferov

The Skeptic Society (Russian: Общество скептиков, Óbščestvo skeptikov) is a Russian-speaking skeptical society. Its aim is to spread critical thinking, popularize science, educate the general public, promote and teach critical and skeptical thinking skills and create a platform for science and skepticism communication.

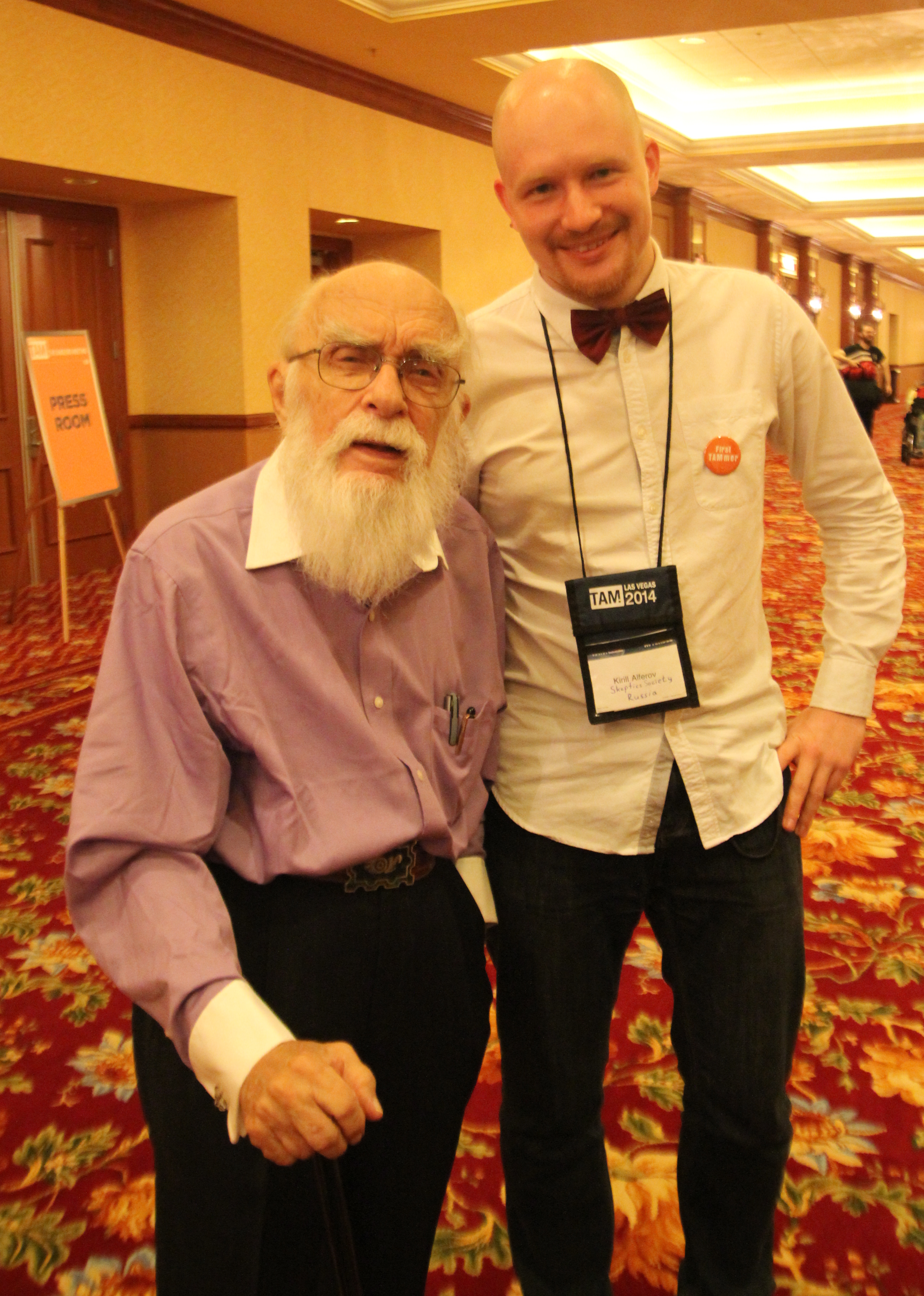
James Randi and Kirill Alferov at The Amaz!ng Meeting 2014

The organization has been inactive since 2022.

== History ==
The Society was founded on 31 March 2013, when Kirill Alferov organized the first meeting of the society in Moscow., in part on the principles frequent in-person meetups and distributed participation. Since then, the Society has met every second Thursday of the month. From 2014 onward, local groups of the Skeptic Society were also founded, and regular meetings held, in Saint Petersburg, Yekaterinburg, Voronezh, Ufa, Samara, Almaty, Pavlodar, Kharkiv, and Kazan.

On 25 October 2014, the first Skeptic Society conference, Skepticon (Скептикон), took place in Moscow. Around 250 people attended the conference. On 26–27 November 2016, the third Skepticon was held with 350 people attending.

== Activities ==
Most of the activities and projects of the society are available online. Despite the fact that there is a lot of skepticism-related information available in English, the society decided not to limit its activity just to translating this information, and started producing its own podcast Skeptik (Russian: Скептик, "Skeptic"). The focus of the podcast became skepticism-related issues that are relevant for Russian society. The Skeptik podcast was produced every Friday from 2013 until January 2015. At the moment the production of the podcast does not have a regular schedule. The podcast Delfinarij (Russian: Дельфинарий, "Dolphinarium") and video programme Kriticheskij vzgljad (Russian: Критический взгляд, "Critical view") as well as short YouTube clips are made under the aegis of the Russian Skeptic Society. The Society offers to give lectures in various educational institutions. It also sets up experiments, that tests the claims of supernatural abilities.
