= Edinburgh Skeptics =

Nonprofit organization in Scotland

Edinburgh Skeptics Society
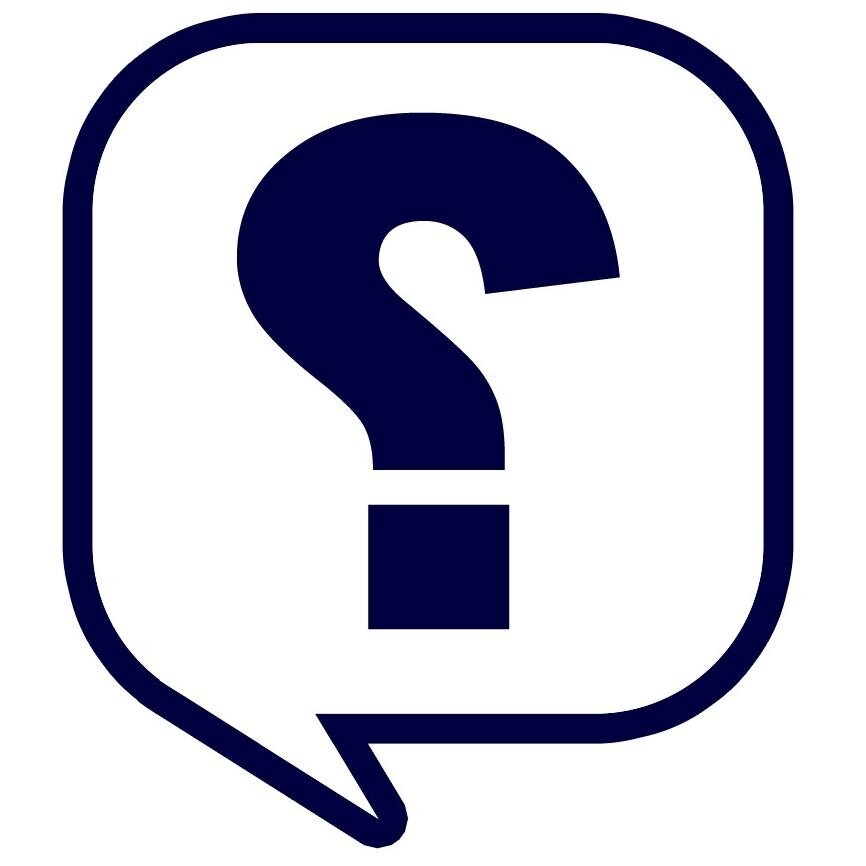
- Abbreviation: EdSkeptics
- Formation: March 2009
- Type: Nonprofit organisation
- Purpose: Promotion of science, reason and critical thinking
- Location: Edinburgh
- Region served: Edinburgh and Lothians
- Founder: Ash Pryce
- Key people: Mark Pentler (Chair) Sean Slater (Co-Chair)
- Website: edinburghskeptics.co.uk

Edinburgh Skeptics (Edinburgh Skeptics Society) is a nonprofit organisation that promotes science, reason, and critical thinking in Edinburgh and throughout Scotland. It was founded in 2009. The Society hosts regular social and educational events in Edinburgh and has campaigned against the use of homeopathy and challenged claims of ghost sightings.

The Society organizes regular talks as part of Skeptics in the Pub. The speaker invited to launch the group in March 2009 was Chris French. Subsequent speakers have included David Aaronovitch and Julian Baggini. In 2010 the Society created the award-winning Skeptics on the Fringe event, which is held annually during the Edinburgh Festival Fringe. Skeptics on the Fringe won an Ockham Award after a vote by the readers of The Skeptic magazine in 2013 and has been awarded 4 stars by the publication Broadway Baby. An Ockham award was again won in 2017. Speakers such as Simon Singh, Richard Wiseman, A C Grayling, Edzard Ernst and Paul Zenon have taken part in this event. Other Fringe activities include themed walking tours of Edinburgh.

Current activities include a range of talks held as part of the Edinburgh International Science Festival, a cinema night, a discussion group and a mobile stall to deliver science and rationalism outreach to the public. In 2015 the Society started the Edinburgh Skeptics Podcast on a variety of platforms with content including interviews with various personalities as well as recordings of the Society's events.

In the past the Society has also co-hosted special events, such as a talk by Marc Abrahams, founder of the Ig Nobel Prizes and continues to work with various groups in the scientific and skeptical community.

== History ==
Edinburgh Skeptics was the fifth Skeptics in the Pub group to be established in the UK. The group was formalised as Edinburgh Skeptics Society in 2009 by Ash Pryce, later to be joined by Alex Buque and Keir Liddle in 2010.

Edinburgh Skeptics was one of the first Skeptic groups in the UK to implement an anti-harassment policy to promote inclusiveness. The policy "Respect people, challenge ideas" covers both visiting speakers and attendees.

=== Meetings ===
The Society organizes regular educational events in Edinburgh. Edinburgh Skeptics also holds social meetings and informal discussions on skeptic topics such as "Should Atheists Ignore Christmas?". The group has also arranged excursion events entitled Skeptical Days Out.

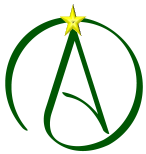
"Should Atheists Ignore Christmas?" Informal discussion topic, Edinburgh Skeptics, December 2010

==== Edinburgh Skeptics in the Pub ====
Meetings include a guest speaker which have included David Aaronovitch discussing his book Voodoo Histories: The Role of Conspiracy Theory in Modern History, and philosopher, writer and journalist Julian Baggini on the subject of Being Sceptical of Scepticism: Ways of Being Wrong. More recent speakers have included Professor David Nutt, Phil Hammond, Kat Arney, and Margaret McCartney.

Talks are also given by group members and cover a wide range of subjects including health care, science, atheism, the paranormal/supernatural, psychics, politics and psychology. Skeptics in the Pub continues to be held on the third Thursday of every month.

=== Skeptics Between the Covers ===
Skeptics Between the Covers was the first skeptical book group in the UK. It was founded by Edinburgh Skeptics to discuss books of interest to Skeptics. The group has covered both fiction and nonfiction genres, such as social psychology and biography, with books including When Prophecy Fails: A Social and Psychological Study of a Modern Group That Predicted the Destruction of the World by Leon Festinger, Henry Riecken, and Stanley Schachter, which contains one of the first published accounts of cognitive dissonance, and Bare-Faced Messiah: The True Story of L. Ron Hubbard by British journalist Russell Miller. Bare-Faced Messiah is a posthumous biography of Scientology founder L. Ron Hubbard, which was originally withdrawn from publication in the US after legal action, although the Court of Appeal of England and Wales allowed publication in the UK in the public interest.

=== Homeopathy ===
The 10:23 Campaign was an awareness campaign and protest against homeopathy. It was started in the UK by the Merseyside Skeptics Society and has international participation. In 2010 the Society organised a protest that included mass homeopathic overdoses outside Boots stores to mock what the protesters asserted to be the lack of efficacy in homeopathic products. As participants in this campaign, Edinburgh Skeptics organised a protest outside the Princes Street branch of Boots against its policy of selling homeopathic preparations as equivalent to mainstream scientifically based medicine.

These 10:23 Campaign protests took place in 70 cities in 30 countries around the world including Australia and New Zealand and resulted in no ill effects to those taking the products.

Following the overdoses, Paul Bennett, professional standards director for Boots, responded by stating, "We know that many people believe in the benefits of complementary medicines and we aim to offer the products we know our customers want".

=== Local campaign ===
The Society was involved in the 2012–13 homeopathy consultation carried out by the Lothian region of the Scottish National Health Service (NHS Scotland), during which it encouraged those who support evidence-based medicine to voice their opposition to homeopathy being provided on the NHS in Scotland. NHS Lothian is one of the fourteen regions of NHS Scotland.

Keir Liddle, president of the Edinburgh Skeptics Society, presented a talk on "Homoeopathy: The Air Guitar of Medicine" and was invited to write an article on the topic alongside Sara Eames, President of the Faculty of Homeopathy.

When the public response to the consultation was announced, Liddle was quoted in the press stating that "Homeopathy is an unevidenced-based relic" and that "The Edinburgh Skeptics Society welcomes the consultation response and hopes that NHS Lothian acts appropriately in ending the funding of magic water on the NHS and using the money saved, [...] to fund more appropriate, evidence-based treatments and care".

=== Debunking paranormal claims ===
The society has also been involved in the debunking of paranormal claims within and around Edinburgh, including a 2009 photograph of Tantallon Castle which was claimed to show a ghost. Ash Pryce of Edinburgh Skeptics informed the press that the photograph "is a woman in a pink jacket coming down some stairs with a shopping bag" and not a ghost.

=== Ghosts Busted tours ===
In 2009 Edinburgh Skeptics founder Ash Pryce created an alternative ghost tour around the capital, where paranormal myths would be debunked. These evolved into "Ghosts Busted: Skeptics on the Mile". The idea received a positive endorsement from celebrity sceptic Chris French, star of shows such as ITV's Haunted Homes, who believed the tour was the first of its kind in the UK. These tours are now being run by a private company.

Edinburgh Skeptics Society also ran The S & M Tour: Science and Medicine, Lock Up Your Doctors as part of Skeptics on the Fringe. The tour has been filmed and is available to the public.

=== Skeptics on the Fringe ===
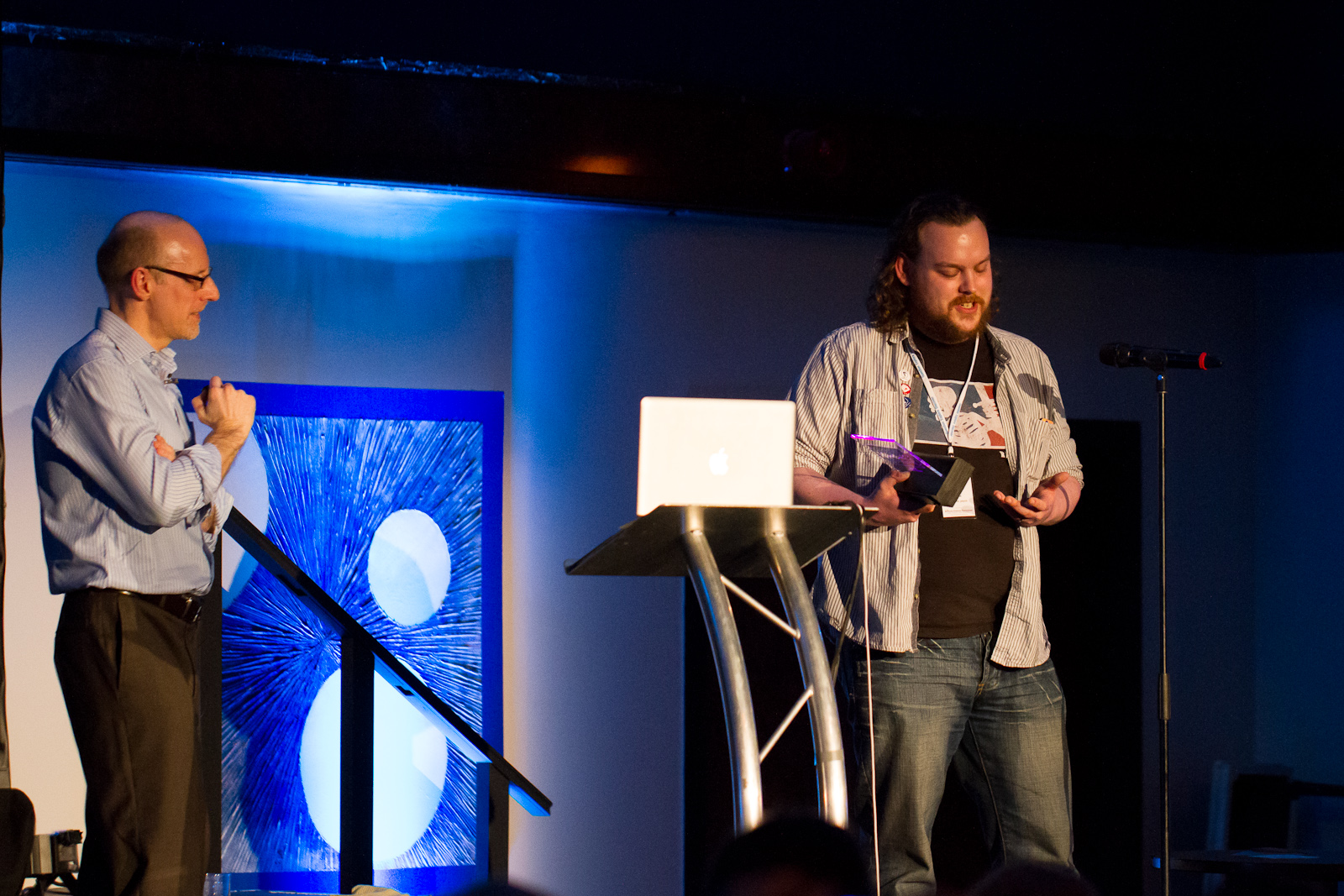
Kier Liddle of Edinburgh Skeptics accepts an Ockham award from Richard Wiseman for Skeptics on the Fringe 2012.

Keir Liddle of Edinburgh Skeptics had the idea of a series of free talks on skepticism to run during the Edinburgh Festival, and in 2010 the Society organised the first season of the Skeptics on the Fringe, an event which is now held annually during the Edinburgh Festival Fringe. In 2012 members organised 46 events with 22 speakers, and Skeptics on the Fringe 2012 won The Skeptic magazine's 2013 Outreach Ockham Award, for Events and Campaigns.

In 2013 members organised speakers for their events including Caroline Wilkinson, Professor of Craniofacial Identification at the University of Dundee, and a presentation by Dr Stephen Makin entitled "Cock and Bull: Truth and Lies about Penis Size". An event entitled "Secularism is our right: Freedom is our culture" by Maryam Namazie, a campaigner for secularism and the de-religionisation of society, was sponsored by the Humanist Society Scotland.

=== The Edinburgh Science Festival ===
In 2012 and 2013 Edinburgh Skeptics put on a season of Skeptics in the Pub events at the Edinburgh International Science Festival entitled "At The Fringe of Reason". Events have included Kat Arney on "The Future of Cancer: Where Have We Come From and Where Are We Going?"; Karen Petrie, from the School of Computing at the University of Dundee, on "Robots and Artificial Intelligence"; and Jamie Gallagher on "The Self Sustaining Soldier". In 2013 a lecture by Prof Alison Murdoch entitled "Ethical challenges in assisted reproduction" was sponsored by the Humanist Society Scotland.

As part of the event, Keir Liddle, of Edinburgh Skeptics, appeared on BBC Radio 4’s Material World to discuss "Skeptics at Science and Arts Festivals".

=== SkeptiCamp ===
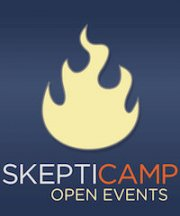
SkeptiCamp "Be A Candle In The Darkness"

Edinburgh Skeptics is part of the international SkeptiCamp movement and held the first SkeptiCamp outside North America. Edinburgh SkeptiCamp is an annual meeting, it began as an evening event and has expanded to be a day of free events organised by the Society. The programme includes talks, videos, discussion groups, debates, speakers’ workshops and entertainment, all skeptically themed.

=== Education and outreach ===
In 2015 the Society created a "skeptical stall" to be deployed at various public events across Edinburgh and Scotland. The stall was first displayed at the annual Meadows Festival, before later being shown at the Scottish Humanists Conference. The stall has since become a collaboration with Glasgow Skeptics. The stall contains information leaflets and science demonstrations with public participation and touches on subjects such as alternative medicine, the paranormal and the existence of psychic abilities.

Members of the Society have been invited to give talks to other skeptics groups in the UK and Ireland on topics such as psychology, alternative medicine and the Burzynski Clinic.

=== Research ===
Edinburgh Skeptics Society has taken part in research projects, including an experiment on luck conducted by Richard Wiseman in 2011. The research tested proposals in Wiseman's book The Luck Factor, by investigating whether people could improve their luck by touching the toe of a statue of David Hume in Edinburgh's High Street, which is a local superstition. This work was covered by The Scotsman newspaper in an article entitled "What's Luck Got To Do With It?".

=== Podcasts ===
Society members can be heard on many podcasts including InKredulous, BadCast (from BadPsychics), The 21st Floor, the Birmingham Skeptics Podcast and several episodes of The Skeptic Zone.

In 2015 the Society began its own podcast hosted by various committee members. The podcast features recordings of the Society's events as well as interviews with various personalities. Special episodes have also been published with discussions on various skeptical topics.

=== Skeptics with a ‘K’ ===
Edinburgh Skeptics Society has stated that they:

use the American spelling because Skepticism as a movement started in the US where they have important public battles to fight in terms of creationism being taught in schools, maintaining the separation of church and state, and so on. Because it started in the US, groups in the rest of the world tend to adopt the US spelling to distinguish Skepticism as a movement from skepticism as an approach to understanding problems. Although Skepticism is not an organised movement, some of the American groups are more structured than groups in the rest of the world, simply because of the scale of the challenges they are rising to.

We capitalise Skeptics when we are referring to people who self-identify as part of the Skeptical movement, and we capitalise Skepticism to acknowledge that Skepticism is a community and not just an attitude of mind or a method of finding out about the world, though it is certainly both of those things too.
