= List of scientific skepticism magazines =

Ste This is a list of notable magazines that promote or practice scientific skepticism.

Magazine	Language	Founded	Publisher	Current editor
Folkvett	Swedish	1983	Vetenskap och Folkbildning	Sven Ove Hansson
Free Inquiry	English	1980	Council for Secular Humanism	Tom Flynn
Nouvelles Sceptiques (Note: Formerly named Nouvelles Brèves.)	French	1949	Comité Para	Olivier Mandler
Science et pseudo-sciences	French	1968	Association française pour l'information scientifique (AFIS)	Jean-Paul Krivine
Skepter	Dutch	1988	Stichting Skepsis	Hans van Maanen
Skeptical Inquirer	English	1976	Committee for Skeptical Inquiry (formerly CSICOP)	Stephen Hupp
Skeptic (Skeptic Magazine)	English	1992	The Skeptics Society	Michael Shermer
Skeptiker	German	1987	Gesellschaft zur wissenschaftlichen Untersuchung von Parawissenschaften	Inge Hüsgen
The Skeptic	English	1981	Australian Skeptics	Tim Mendham
The Skeptic (Note: Named The British & Irish Skeptic until vol. 4, issue 3.)	English	1987	Committee for Skeptical Inquiry (formerly CSICOP)	Michael Marshall
Wonder en is gheen Wonder	Dutch	2000	SKEPP	Pieter Van Nuffel

== See also ==
- Humanism
- Lists about skepticism
- List of books about skepticism
- List of skeptical conferences
- List of skeptical organizations
- List of skeptical podcasts
- List of notable skeptics
- Rationalism
