= Harold Leslie Keer Whitehouse =

UK botanist (1917–2000)

Harold Leslie Keer Whitehouse (13 April 1917 – 18 January 2000) was a British botanist and bryologist. He is credited with a discovery of a number of species, as well as with being a president of the British Bryological Society.

Whitehouse was born in Churchdown, Gloucestershire, Great Britain. His father, Arnold Arthur Gray Whitehouse, was a schoolteacher and a Cambridge graduate in mathematics, and Harold Leslie Keer Whitehouse had two brothers, an older and a younger one. Harold Whitehouse entered Queen’s College, University of Cambridge in 1936, and eventually started a PhD in biology under supervision of David Catcheside. His graduate studies were interrupted by World War II, during which he was detached to the Royal Air Force photographic unit in Medmenham, Buckinghamshire. After the war, Whitehouse returned to Cambridge and was awarded a PhD on the genetics of ascomycetes. Subsequently, he was hired by the Botany School at Cambridge. He was appointer lecturer in 1952 and reader in 1969, retiring in 1984.

The botanical speciality of Whitehouse was mosses. In particular, he described Dicranella staphylina in 1969.

He was married to Patricia Horlick and had two daughters.
