= Helen Sang =

Helen Mary Sang OBE FRSE FRSB
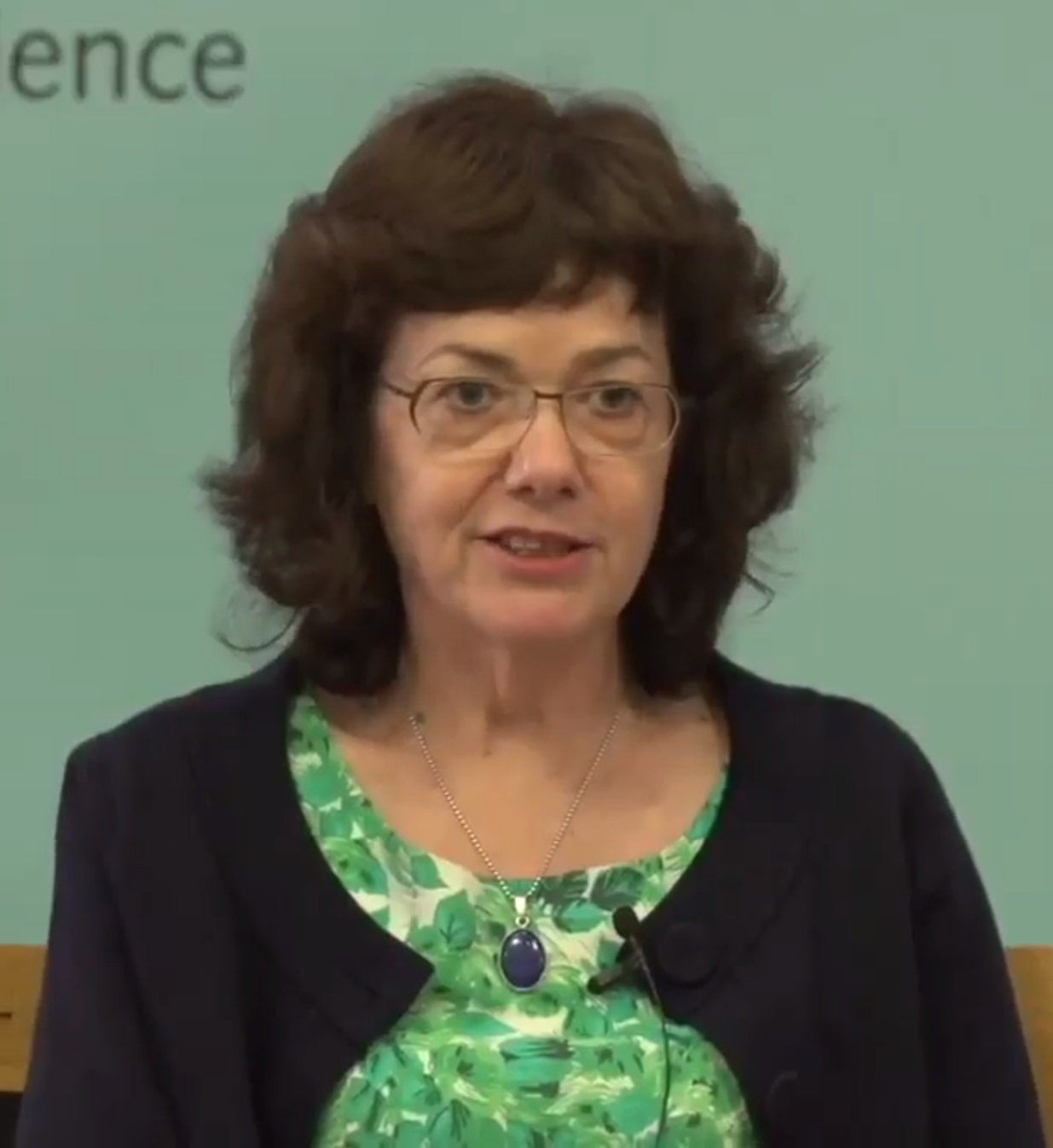
- Sang speaks at the British Library in 2014
- Born: 1955 (age 70–71)
- Education: University of Cambridge (BSc, PhD)
- Scientific career
- Workplaces: Roslin Institute; University of Edinburgh; Harvard University
- Thesis: Studies in genetic recombination in Sordaria brevicollis (1975)
- Doctoral advisor: Harold Leslie Keer Whitehouse

Helen Mary Sang OBE FRSE FRSB (born 1955) is the head of the Division of Developmental Biology at the Roslin Institute of the University of Edinburgh. Her research considers the development of chickens that cannot spread avian influenza (bird flu). She has previously served on the Biotechnology and Biological Sciences Research Council.

== Early life and education ==
Sang studied natural sciences at the University of Cambridge and graduated in 1972. She earned her doctorate in the Department of Botany where she studied genetic recombination in Sordaria. She worked in the laboratory of Harold Leslie Keer Whitehouse. After earning her PhD, Sang was awarded a SERC–NATO fellowship to look at mismatch repair in E. coli working with Matthew Meselson at Harvard University.

== Research and career ==
Sang returned to the United Kingdom as a Medical Research Council fellow working with David Finnegan at the University of Edinburgh. Here she investigated the transposable element that is responsible for the I-R system of hybrid dysgenesis in Drosophila melanogaster. Sang was made principal investigator at the Agriculture and Food Research Council (AFRC) Poultry Research Centre, which became the Roslin Institute in 1993. Sang has dedicated much of her research career to the genetic modification of chickens. In the 1980s when Sang started at the Roslin Institute she started to investigate ways to genetically modify hens so that they created valuable proteins in their eggs. She proposed purifying the egg whites and making use of the engineered proteins for medical therapies to treat cancer, arthritis and multiple sclerosis. Since then, genome editing has evolved so that genes can be inserted into the DNA of chickens, producing new human proteins alongside those in egg white. Working with Lissa Herron Sang demonstrated new ways to purify these egg proteins. In 2019 she demonstrated that these hens could produce IFNalpha2a, a protein which has anti-viral and anti-cancer potential.

She has developed new ways to produce transgenic chickens using lentiviral vectors. The transgenic chickens can serve as models for investigations into vertebrate development. Sang and colleagues developed transgenic lines that incorporated green fluorescent protein and membrane localised green fluorescent proteins in cells that are developing embryos. These could be used for in vivo imaging or grafting to analyse lineage during embryogenesis.

In 2011 together with Laurence Tiley Sang demonstrated that she could genetically modify chickens to confer resistance to avian influenza.

=== Awards and honours ===
Sang is a fellow of the Royal Society of Edinburgh (2008) and the Royal Society of Biology. From 2015 to 2018 Sang served on the Biotechnology and Biological Sciences Research Council. Sang was appointed Officer of the Order of the British Empire (OBE) in the 2020 New Year Honours for services to food security and bioscience for health.

=== Selected publications ===
Her publications include:

- Sang, Helen (2004). "Efficient production of germline transgenic chickens using lentiviral vectors". EMBO Reports. 5 (7): 728–733. doi:10.1038/sj.embor.7400171. PMC 1299092. PMID 15192698.
- Sang, Helen (1994). "Transgenic Birds by DNA Microinjection". EMBO Reports. 12 (1): 60–63. doi:10.1038/nbt0194-60. PMID 7764327. S2CID 8465540.
- Sang, Helen (2004). "Prospects for transgenesis in the chick" (PDF). Mechanisms of Development. 121 (9): 1179–1186. doi:10.1016/j.mod.2004.05.012. hdl:20.500.11820/bec5f7b2-b8aa-45a0-8fa5-104429dd62b7. PMID 15296981. S2CID 18408892.

Sang has appeared on The Naked Scientists and delivered a TED talk on the need for genetically modified chickens.
