= Edinburgh Science =

Educational charity

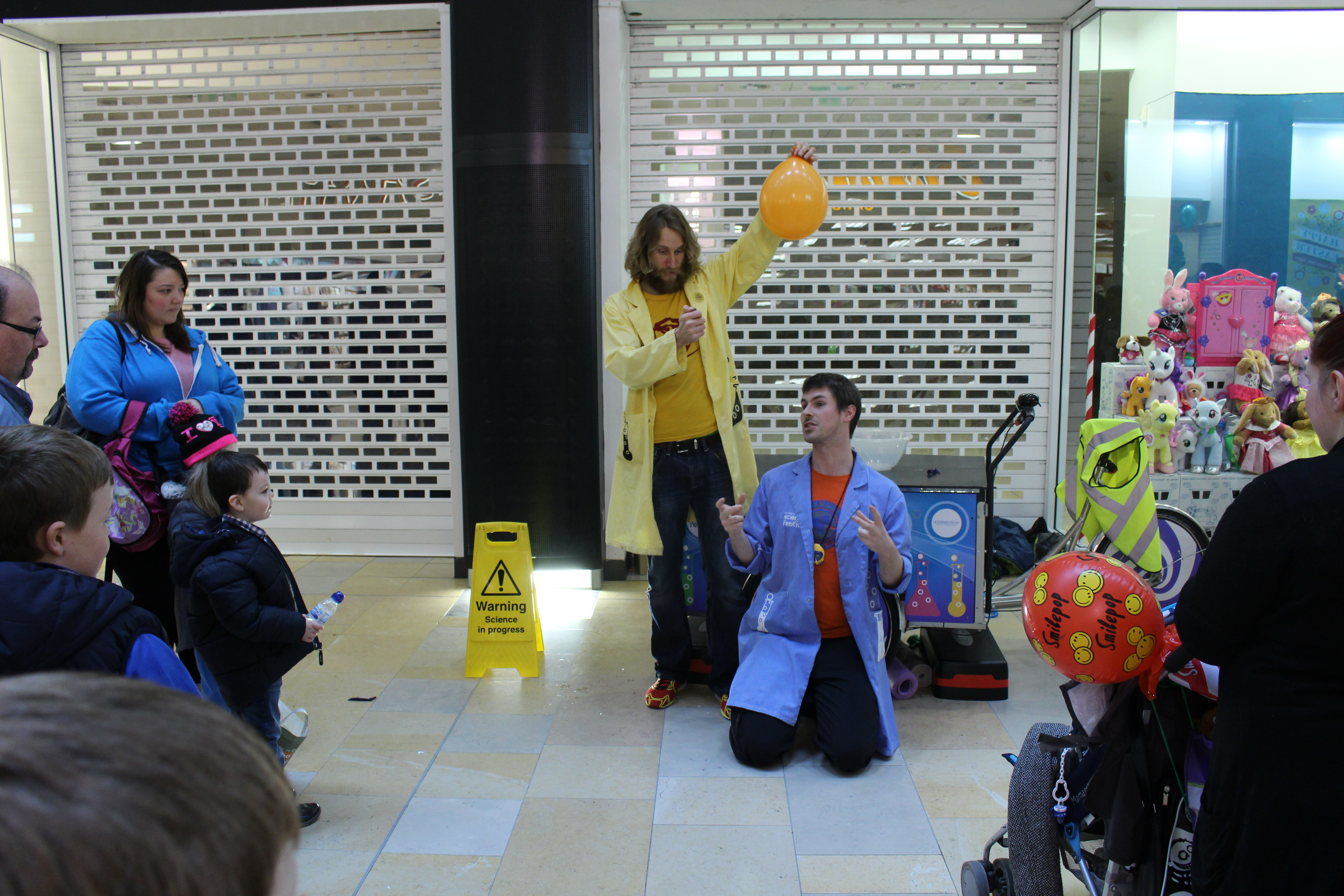
A science experiment being demonstrated to the public during the festival

Edinburgh Science, founded in 1989, is an educational charity. It organises a two-week Edinburgh's annual Science Festival, the world's first public celebration of science and technology, and still one of Europe's largest. Alongside the annual Festival in Edinburgh, the organisation has a strong focus on education and runs touring programme Generation Science that visits schools around Scotland throughout the year. Edinburgh Science also operates a large-scale international programme of work under the Worldwide arm. It regularly presents events overseas and has been the major programming partner of the annual Abu Dhabi Science Festival, helping to curate, produce, and deliver the event.

Edinburgh Science holds various educational activities and events. Their portfolio includes more than 100 workshops, exhibitions, and shows which are delivered worldwide though festivals, schools outreach, careers events, collaboration projects, and health education programmes.

In January 2019, the organisation changed its name from Edinburgh International Science Festival to Edinburgh Science.

== Edinburgh Science Festival ==
The Edinburgh Science Festival is an annual science festival taking place across the Easter school holidays in Edinburgh. Each year it delivers the UK's largest Science Festival with almost 270 events for families and adults over the course of two weeks. Its programmes include family days out, hands-on activities, talks and discussions. Family Festival goers enjoy five floors of science at City Art Centre, talks with scientists at the Pleasance and hands-on activities and more at the National Museum of Scotland and other partner venues across Edinburgh, including Our Dynamic Earth, Edinburgh Zoo, the Royal Botanic Garden Edinburgh and Summerhall.

The Festival was first held in 1989, and its principal sponsors were the City of Edinburgh District Council and the Scottish Executive. Alan Shepard, the first American in space, inaugurated the Festival.

Over the years, Science Festival partners have included the Medical Research Council, SCI-FUN, the University of Edinburgh, Bang Goes The Theory and many more. Dr. Bunhead regularly appears at the Festival. Speakers have included Professor Richard Dawkins, Brian Cox, Professor Sir Ian Wilmut, Dame Jocelyn Bell Burnell, Christiana Figueres and Professor Cordelia Fine.

=== Edinburgh Medal ===
The Edinburgh Medal was instituted by the City of Edinburgh District Council in 1988. Each year this prestigious award is given to men and women of science and technology whose professional achievements are judged to have made a significant contribution to the understanding and well-being of humanity. The Medalist then delivers a lecture at the Edinburgh Science Festival.

The 2019 Edinburgh Medal was awarded to Christiana Figueres, for her work as a recognised world leader on global climate change and her efforts in bringing nations together to jointly deliver an unprecedented climate change agreement. Christiana Figueres, Executive Secretary of the UN Framework Convention on Climate Change (UNFCCC), was instrumental in the successful conclusion of the Paris talks. The Summit saw all of the world's nations agree for the first time to a binding commitment to avoid dangerous levels of global warming. Figueres served as the UN's Climate Chief from 2010 until July 2016.

== Edinburgh Science Learning ==
=== Generation Science ===
Generation Science brings science lessons to classrooms all over Scotland with a programme of shows and hands-on workshops. The tour visits schools across Scotland from January to May each year. All Generation Science shows and workshops are linked to the experiences and outcomes of the Scottish Government's Curriculum for Excellence. The aim is to improve the teaching of science in Scottish primary schools and support teachers to deliver the curriculum. The next Generation Science tour will run from January–May 2020.

=== Careers Hive ===
Careers Hive is a careers education event designed to give students in S1-S3 a new way to think about their futures, developed under the leadership of Head of Learning, Joan Davidson. It highlights the opportunities available to those who study STEM subjects (science, technology, engineering and maths), as well as the cross-disciplinary skills and subjects that can support and enhance STEM careers. Careers Hive will run 24–29 February 2020 at the National Museum of Scotland.

=== Training ===
Edinburgh Science Learning is currently developing a career-long professional learning framework that will serve scientists, artists and science engagement professionals, including teachers and youth workers. The programme will be developed with practitioners and will cover individuals from entry level through to master practitioners.

== Edinburgh Science Worldwide ==
Alongside the Edinburgh Science activities in Scotland the organisation also operates internationally.

Through Edinburgh Science Worldwide, the organisation work with national and international partners to help with programming and event delivery at other science festivals, provide business planning support and tour the shows and workshops. Edinburgh Science Worldwide has been the content programming partner for the Abu Dhabi Science Festival since its inception in 2011.

Previous projects include the delivery of Cyber Quest in Abu Dhabi which brings together young minds from across the country to compete on a series of cyber security challenges, work with the UK Space Agency and partners to deliver events and celebrate UK ESA astronaut Tim Peake's six-month Principia Mission on board the International Space Station (ISS), and bringing large-scale exhibition Play On to Germany in 2017.

== Relationships to Other Festivals ==
The Edinburgh International Science Festival is one of 12 Edinburgh-based festivals who work collaboratively as Festivals Edinburgh on audience development, promotion and similar activities, including the Festivals API.

== Notable Edinburgh Science Events ==
In 2012 a team from Edinburgh Science project managed the UK tour of Ottobock's Passion for Paralympics exhibition, which raised awareness of Paralympic sport and athletes heading into the London 2012 Paralympic Games.

In 2013 the Science Festival hosted the first Mini Maker Faire in Scotland. This Edinburgh Mini Maker Faire event (also run in 2014, 2015, 2016, 2017, 2018), bringing together artists, craftspeople, programmers, engineers, and other makers is an offshoot of the Maker Faire initiative, organised by MAKE magazine and O'Reilly Publishing.

In the summer of 2013, Edinburgh Science joined forces with National Museums Scotland to deliver a brand new project called Rock the Lab. This involved a creation of science busking activities for the project to highlight the science behind hedonism.

In 2015 and 2016 Edinburgh Science worked with the UK Space Agency and partners around Edinburgh to jump develop and deliver bespoke events to celebrate UK ESA astronaut Tim Peake's six-month Principia Mission on board the International Space Station (ISS). This included a programme of hands-on activities for local school children, a live screening of the mission launch with Italian ESA Astronaut Samantha Cristoforetti, who had recently returned from her own mission on the ISS, and bringing Tim Peake and mission colleague astronaut Tim Kopra for an evening at the Usher Hall on 17 October 2016.

In 2017 Edinburgh Science brought band Public Service Broadcasting to the Science Festival to perform their hit album The Race for Space from start to finish.

At the 2018 Edinburgh Science Festival, Edinburgh Science engaged the work of US-based artist Jason Hackenwerth to create a giant balloon sculpture in the Grand Gallery of the National Museum of Scotland. Called Event Horizon, this sculpture included 26,000 balloons and represented the point of no return in a black hole.
