= Sharon A. Hill =

American geologist and science blogger

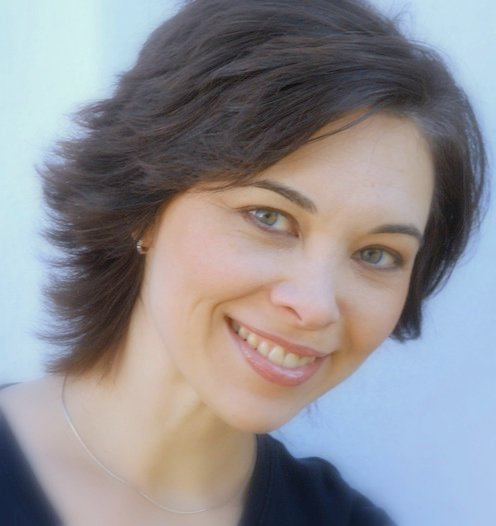
- Education: Pennsylvania State University; University at Buffalo
- Known for: Geology; scientific skepticism
- Website: sharonahill.com

Sharon A. Hill is an American science writer and speaker known for her research into the interaction between science and the public, focusing on education and media topics. Hill's research has dealt mainly with paranormal, pseudoscience, and strange natural phenomena and began at the University at Buffalo, where she performed her graduate work in this area. Hill attended Pennsylvania State University, earning her Bachelor of Science degree in geosciences and working as a Pennsylvania geologist.

Hill is the founder of Doubtful News, a news site that links synopses and commentary to original news sources and provides information to critically assess claims made in the media (no longer being updated). She is also the producer and host of the Doubtful News podcast called 15 Credibility Street. She has also created the Spooky Geology website.

Hill has been a contributor to The Huffington Post blog and has appeared in written and podcast media discussing related topics. She wrote the Sounds Sciencey column for the Committee for Skeptical Inquiry, has contributed reports and articles to Skeptical Inquirer and Skeptical Briefs and contributed to various skeptical, science and paranormal blogs. Hill also has been a speaker at various science-related and science-fiction-related conferences, including Balticon, The Amazing Meeting, NECSS, and Dragon Con.

She published her first book, Scientifical Americans: The Culture of Amateur Paranormal Researchers, in 2017.

== Career ==
Hill has worked as a geologist with the Pennsylvania State Department of Environmental Protection in the department's mining office. As a geologist and public policy expert, Hill has been involved in the investigation and remediation efforts of sinkholes and has presented on public policies related to sinkholes as well as on mining regulatory issues.

== Scientific skepticism ==
Interested in ghosts and monsters from a young age, as Hill grew older, she realized that "science was a better way of explaining the world." She credits the works of Stephen Jay Gould as her gateway into skepticism. In her 2011 Meet the Skeptics! podcast interview, she states that becoming a skeptic was a gradual process and that she realized "there was a better way to look at these subjects [ghosts] in a more critical way." In 2012, Hill was named as a scientific and technical consultant for the Center for Inquiry.

Hill partnered with former ghost-hunter turned skeptic Kenny Biddle to form and organize the Anomalies Research Society, a network of professionals that focus on ethical, evidence-based investigation of paranormal and anomalous events.

In March 2013, Hill launched the "Media Guide to Skepticism" document, published on the website of the James Randi Educational Foundation. She said she was inspired by Wired.com's "Media Guide to Volcanoes", with the aim of assisting reporters looking to write about scientific skepticism, as well as those new to the movement.

Hill was also a contributing blogger for The Huffington Post as "a researcher specializing in the interaction between science, the media and the public" and has contributed to various skeptical, science and paranormal blogs such as Skeptoid and Aaron Sagers' Paranormal Pop Culture.

In 2018, Hill publicly eschewed the skeptic label due to perceived negative connotations of the term and issues she has with organized skepticism. She stated, "the label is limiting and is overwrought with mistaken assumptions of being elitist, arrogant, and closed-minded." She also stated, "Atheism adherence and advocacy, a separate and narrower niche, continues to be conflated with skepticism." She maintains her support for the "philosophy and process of scientific skepticism." This attitude was foreshadowed in her Sounds Sciencey column in 2013, in which she stated the terms skeptics and believers are limiting, especially how both terms are perceived culturally. Neither her websites nor her podcast use the word skeptic.

=== Study of paranormal investigative groups ===
In 2011, Hill appeared at the Balticon Science Fiction Convention, where she delivered the presentation "Being Scientifical," which focused on amateur research groups and particularly focused on self-styled paranormal researchers.

The topic of amateur research and investigation groups (ARIGs) was also the subject of Hill's master's thesis, which examined the "community of amateur paranormal investigators and how they used science." She found that the groups "used science almost exclusively as a way to look legitimate ... These people didn't have any scientific training."

In an interview regarding The Scope of Skepticism, Hill discussed with Kylie Sturgess her opinion, based on research findings, that most paranormal groups can cause harm to the public. According to Hill, many amateur paranormal investigation groups state they "do science ... when it's absolutely not." In her podcast interview with Meet the Skeptics!, Hill states that, "amateur paranormal investigation groups who that say they use the quote-unquote scientific method, try to do that but they miss out on that more complicated end of it where they don't want to test their ideas, they don't want critique ... they don't want to present it to the scientific community, they don't want it picked at, and therefore it's not science." Hill has criticized paranormal investigators for telling parents that demons are the cause of noises and their children's odd behavior, characterizing this practice as "mean and unethical."

=== Doubtful News ===
In 2011, Hill started the Doubtful News web site, which curates news sources while providing commentary and background information. Hill stated on Skepticality that Doubtful News is "a way to look at weird news in a more skeptical light."

=== 15 Credibility Street ===
On October 17, 2016, Doubtful News launched a podcast named 15 Credibility Street for which Hill is both producer and host with cohosts Torkel Ødegård and Howard Lewis. (Lewis left the show in May 2017). The podcast is intended to "be a platform to discuss items that appear on the Doubtful News website for further reflection and comment as well as other topics of a skeptical or Fortean bent."

== Role of skepticism ==
Hill has criticized narrowing the focus of skepticism to target religious belief specifically, stating that "criticism of religion really doesn't have a place in scientific framework ... But when religious claims cross over into testable claims, then they are fair game for the skeptic." Although Hill works to investigate claims of the paranormal, she has stated that "'Does God exist' is not a skeptic question", and that "scientific skepticism and atheism are very different things."

Hill has encouraged an increase in the dialog between paranormal believers and skepticism groups, encouraging skeptics to "take time to listen to the other side, especially ... the believers, because there is something to learn from them." In April 2013, Hill reviewed a skeptic conference for Aaron Sagers' paranormal entertainment site Paranormal Pop Culture.

In a May 2013 interview for The Paranormal Podcast by Jim Harold, Hill described ways in which the efforts of both skeptical and paranormal investigators could benefit from sharing viewpoints. In dialog with Hill, Harold stated that "we as believers ... can maybe take some useful things from [the skeptical perspective], be a little more critical when we're looking at things and still maintain our beliefs, our viewpoint."

=== Skepticism as consumer protection ===
On April 14, 2013, interview on Strange Frequencies Radio, Hill stated that she views the role of scientific skepticism as one of "consumer protection" to help people better evaluate even everyday claims: "We really need to apply skepticism every day in life, or else we'll get scammed, taken by some product that doesn't work, or it could affect our health or checking account."

== Scientifical Americans ==
Historian Brian Regal reviewed Hill's first book, Scientifical Americans, calling it a timely book during an era when many question science. Regal feels that this book will not deter believers in the paranormal, but is an important part of a "growing literature on amateur paranormal research". Protoview writes that Hill "criticizes paranormal discussion flavored with science-like concepts and jargon, while, at the same time, notes that science is done by inherently fallible humans who are not flawless or unbiased" and that she "encourages new and better approaches to paranormal field research and investigation.

== Bibliography ==
- Hill, Sharon A. (2017). Scientifical Americans: The Culture of Amateur Paranormal Researchers. McFarland. ISBN 978-1476672472.
