= Skeptics in the Pub =

Informal social event for skeptics since 1999

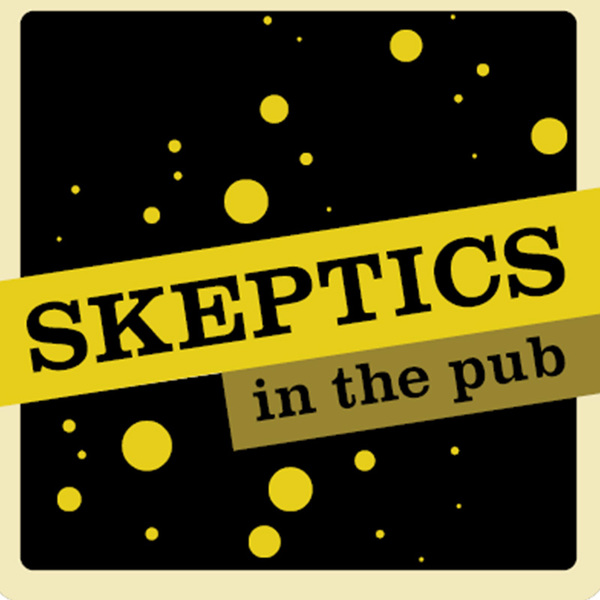
- Common logo of SITP events worldwide
- Status: Active
- Genre: skepticism, rationalism, science, critical thinking, activism, and freethought
- Location: Various cities across the world
- Country: International
- Inaugurated: 1999
- Founder: Scott Campbell (London)
- Most recent: Current
- Attendance: Variable, up to hundreds
- Organizer: Various people and groups
- Website: Official website

Skeptics in the Pub (abbreviated SITP) is an informal social event designed to promote fellowship and social networking among skeptics, critical thinkers, freethinkers, rationalists and other like-minded individuals. It provides an opportunity for skeptics to talk, share ideas and have fun in a casual atmosphere, and discuss whatever topical issues come to mind, while promoting skepticism, science, and rationality.

== Format ==
"Skeptics in the Pub" is not a protected term, anyone can set one up. There also is no formal procedure to organising an event; organisers can fill in activities as they see fit. There are, however, some common approaches across the world in hosting such events that make them more successful.

The usual format of meetings includes an invited speaker who gives a talk on a specific topic, followed by a question-and-answer session. Other meet-ups are informal socials, with no fixed agenda. The groups usually meet once a month at a public venue, most often a local pub. By 2012 there were more than 100 different "SitP" groups running around the world.

== History ==
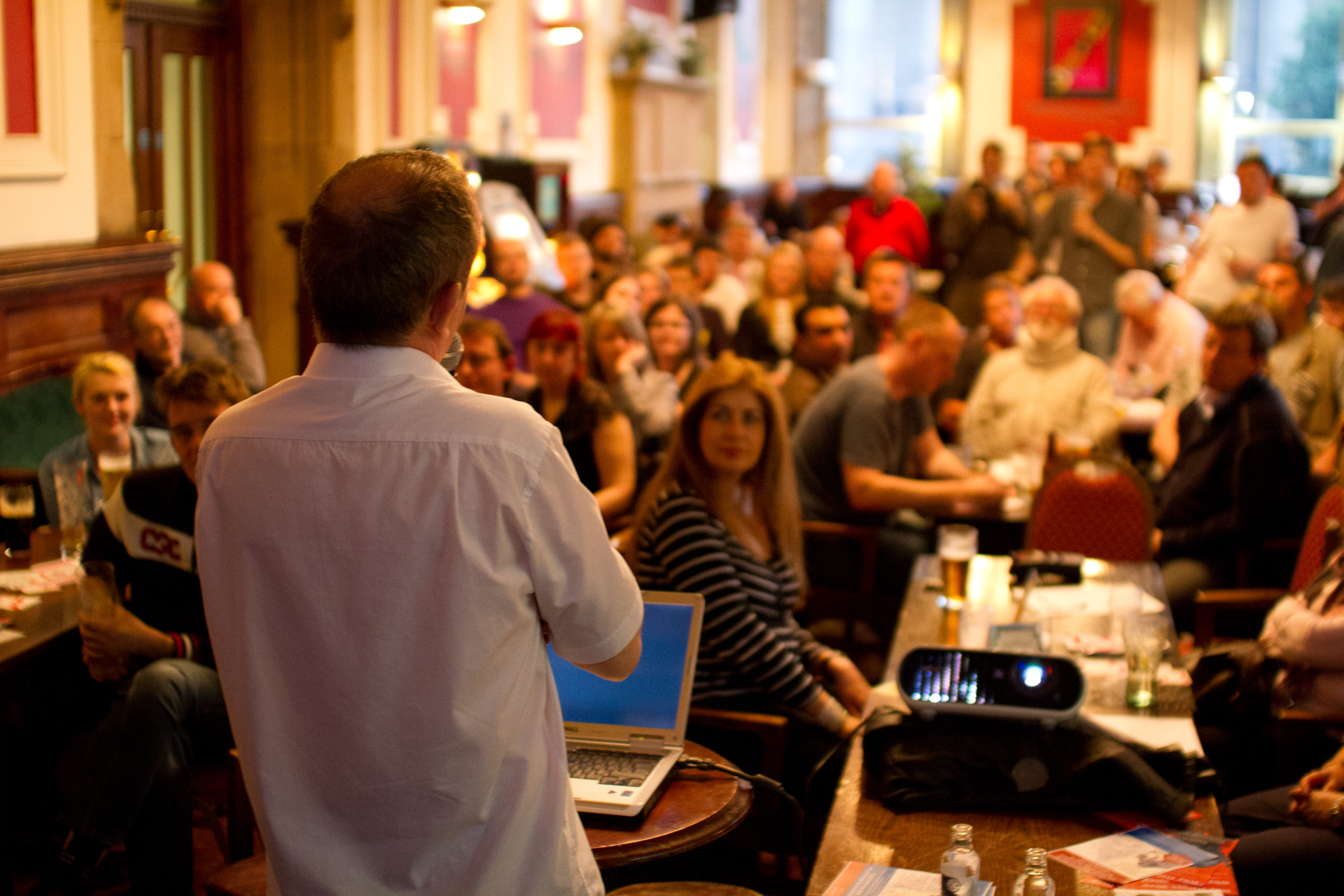
Brian Deer speaking at a Skeptics in the Pub event in Liverpool

=== London ===
The earliest and longest-running event is the award-winning London meeting, established by Australian philosophy academic Scott Campbell in 1999. Campbell based the idea around Philosophy in the Pub and Science in the Pub, two groups which had been running in Australia for some time. The inaugural speaker was Wendy M. Grossman, the editor and founder of The Skeptic magazine, in February 1999; this first talk attracted 30 attendees. The London group claims to be the "World's largest regular pub meeting," with 200 to 400 people in attendance at each meeting.

Campbell ran the London group for three years while there on a teaching sabbatical, and was succeeded after his return to Australia by two sci-fi fans and skeptics, Robert Newman and Marc LaChappelle. Nick Pullar, who made a television appearance as "Convener of Skeptics in the Pub" on the BBC spoof show Shirley Ghostman, then led the group from 2003 to 2008. As of 2011, the London group was co-convened by Sid Rodrigues, who has co-organised events in several other cities around the world. This group has conducted experiments on the paranormal as part of James Randi's One Million Dollar Paranormal Challenge and co-organised An Evening with James Randi & Friends.

Some of the speakers at London Skeptics in the Pub have been Simon Singh, Victor Stenger, Jon Ronson, Phil Plait, David Colquhoun, Richard J. Evans, S. Fred Singer, Ben Goldacre, David Nutt, and Mark Stevenson.

=== Around the world ===
The ease of use of the internet, via social networking sites and content management systems, has led to more than 100 active chapters around the world, including more than 30 in the US and more than 40 in the UK. In 2009, D. J. Grothe described the rise of Skeptics in the Pub across cities in North America and elsewhere as a prominent example of "Skepticism 2.0". SITPs were often founded outside the realm of existing skeptical organisations (mostly centred around magazines), with some successful meetings growing out to become fully-fledged membership organisations.

"Skeptics in the Pub" would later serve as the template for other skeptical, rationalist, and atheist meet-ups around the globe, including The James Randi Educational Foundation's "The Amazing Meeting", Drinking Skeptically, The Brights, and the British Humanist Association social gatherings.

Since 2010 Edinburgh Skeptics in the Pub has extended the Skeptics in the Pub concept over the whole Edinburgh International Festival Fringe, under the banner Skeptics on the Fringe and from 2012 done the same at the Edinburgh International Science Festival with the title At The Fringe of Reason. The Merseyside Skeptics Society and Greater Manchester Skeptics (forming North West Skeptical Events Ltd) hosted three two-day conferences, QED, in February 2011, March 2012 and April 2013. Glasgow Skeptics has also hosted two one-day conferences, as of July 2011.

== See also ==
- Camp Quest
- CSICon
- European Skeptics Congress (ESC)
- List of public house topics
- New Zealand Skeptics
- SkeptiCamp
- Skepticon
- Skeptic's Toolbox (sponsored by the Center for Inquiry)
- Question, Explore, Discover (QED)
- The Amaz!ng Meeting (TAM)
