= European Skeptics Congress =

Annual science conference

European Skeptics Congresses (ESCs) – a series of congresses now supported by the European Council of Skeptical Organisations (ECSO), in which skeptical organisations from many different European countries participate. They have been held ever since 1989. The conferences are often held in the month of September, and may last from two up to four days. The ECSO was formed at the 6th ESC on 25 September 1994 in Ostend, Belgium. Since its foundation, the ECSO co-ordinates in the organisation of new ESCs that take place (on average) every other year, and is hosted by a different member organisation each time. Skeptical organisations that are non-ECSO members may also send their delegations. Past ESCs are enumerated below.

== ESC 1, Germany 1989 ==
Date: 5–7 May

Place: Bad Tölz

== ESC 2, Belgium 1990 ==
Date: 10–11 August

Place: Brussels

== ESC 3, Netherlands 1991 ==
Date: 4–5 October

Place: Amsterdam

== ESC 4, Italy 1992 ==
Date: 17–19 July

Place: Saint-Vincent

== ESC 5, United Kingdom 1993 ==
Date: 29–31 August

Place: Keele

Theme: "Science for Life: Health, Medicine and Well-Being". Organised by the UK Skeptics.

== ESC 6, Belgium 1994 ==
Date: 23–25 September

Place: Ostend

Theme: "Science, Pseudoscience and the Environment".

During this congress the European Council of Skeptical Organisations was formed.

== ESC 7, Germany 1995 ==
Date: 4–7 May

Place: Roßdorf

== ESC 8, Spain 1997 ==
Date: 4–7 September

Place: A Coruña

== ESC 9, Netherlands 1999 ==
Date: 17–19 September

Place: Maastricht

Hosted by Stichting Skepsis

== ESC 10, Czech Republic 2001 ==
Date: 7–9 September

Place: Prague

Theme: "Rise and Development of Paranormal Beliefs in Eastern Europe"

== ESC 11, United Kingdom 2003 ==
Date: 5–7 September

Place: London

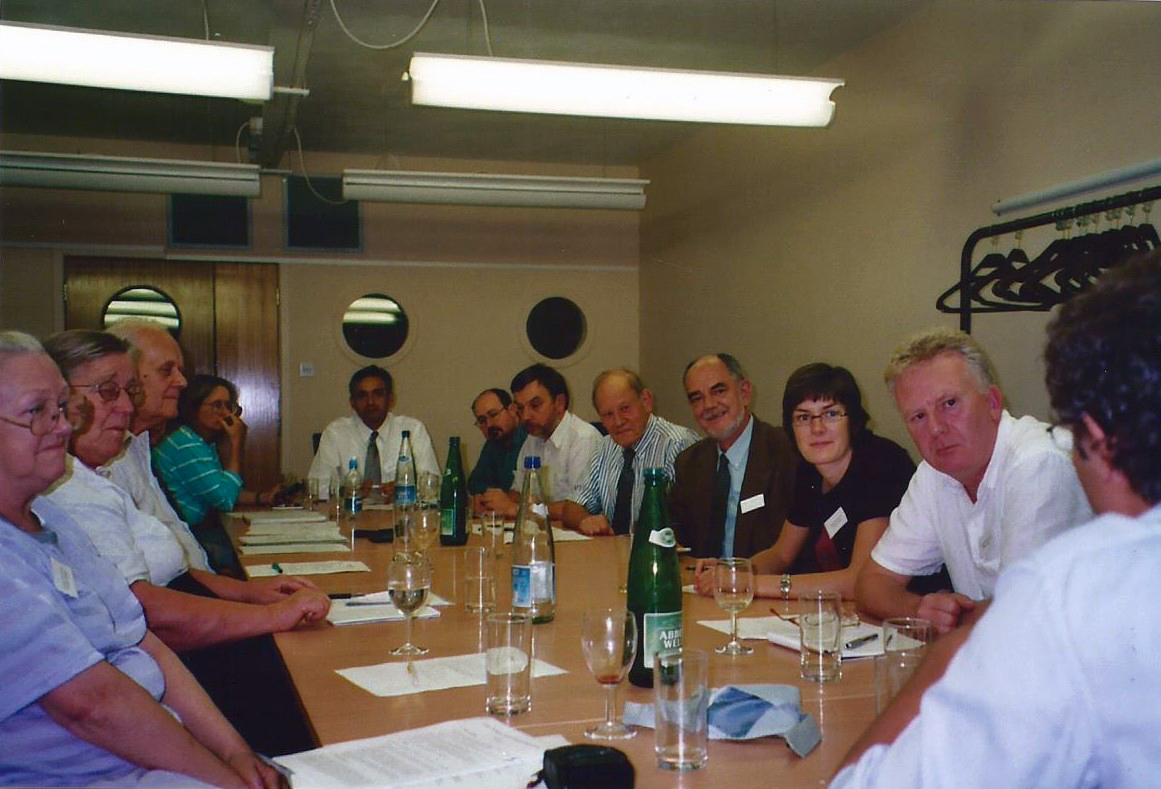
ECSO Board and CSICOP members meeting at the 11th European Skeptics Congress in London

== ESC 12, Belgium 2005 ==
Date: 13–15 October

Place: Brussels

Theme: "Pseudoscience, Alternative Medicine and the Media"

== ESC 13, Ireland 2007 ==
Date: 7–9 September

Place: Dublin

Theme: "The Assault on Science: Constructing a Response" 100+ attendees.

== ESC 14, Hungary 2010 ==
Date: 17–19 September

Place: Budapest

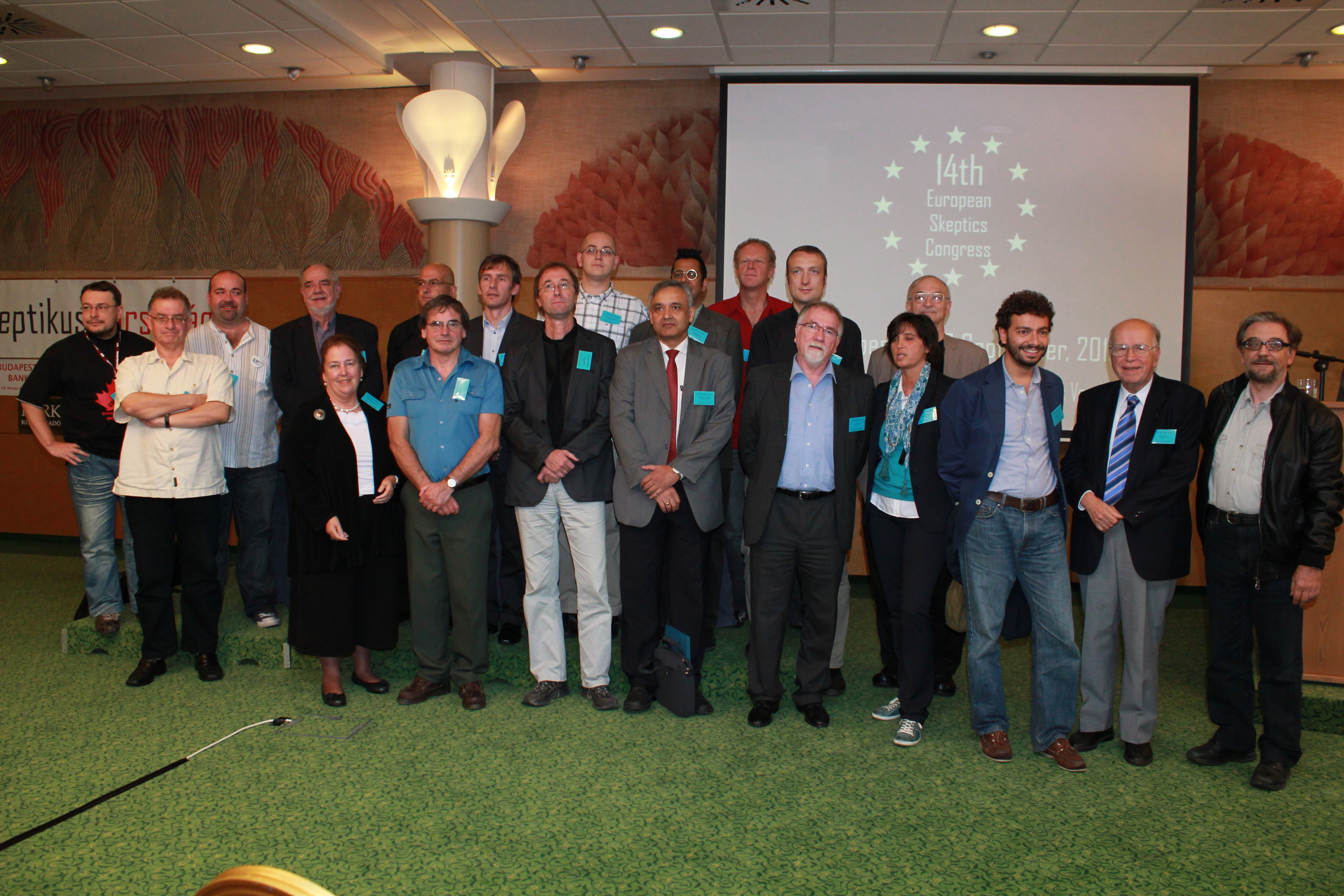
Speakers at the 14th European Skeptics Congress in Budapest. Front row, from left to right: Chris French, J. Beth Ciesielski, Michael Heap, György Kampis, Amardeo Sarma, István Vágó, Klára Sándor, Massimo Polidoro, Iván Almár, Luigi Garlaschelli. Back row, from left to right: Gergely Röst, Andy Wilson, Wim Betz, Tomasz Witkowski, Attila Nyerges, Maciej Zatonski, Simon Singh, Gerald de Jong, Klaus Schmeh, Joe Nickell.

== ESC 15, Sweden 2013 ==
Date: 22–25 August

Place: Stockholm

Theme: "ESCape to Clarity!"

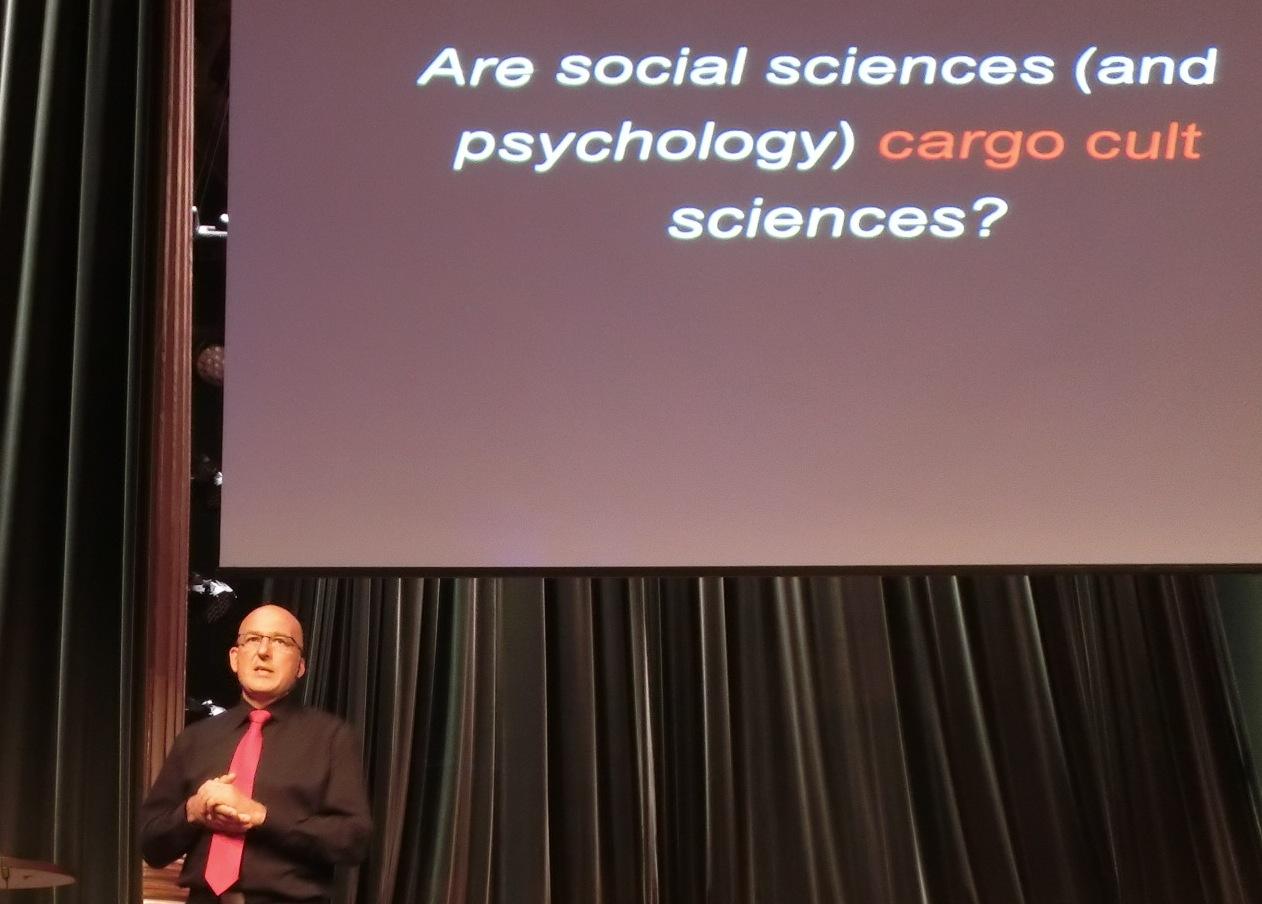
Tomasz Witkowski lecturing at the 15th European Skeptics Congress 2013

== ESC 16, United Kingdom 2015 ==
Date: 10–13 September

Place: London

Organised by Association for Skeptical Enquiry and Anomalistic Psychology Research Unit

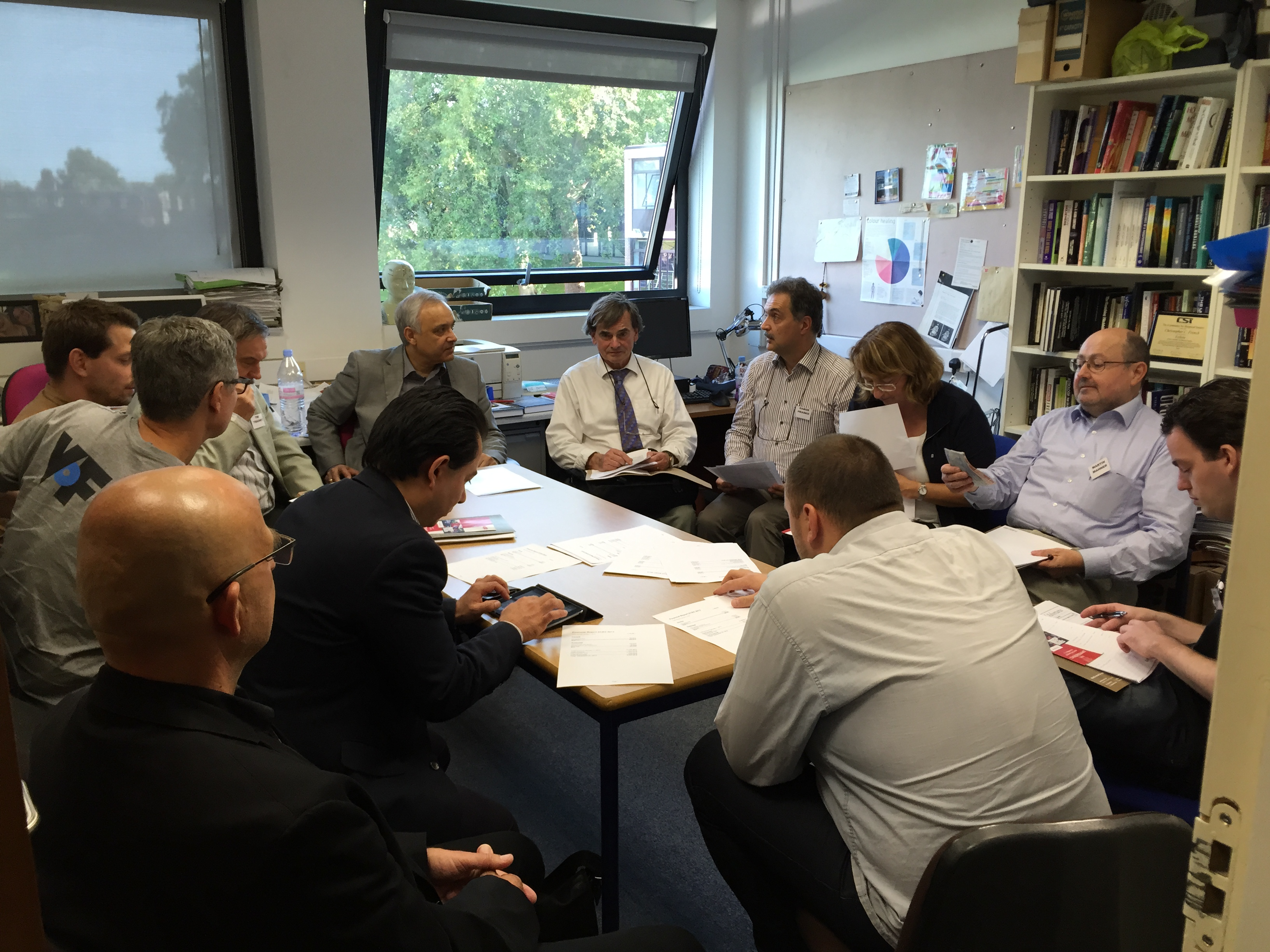
Meeting of the representatives of ECSO member organisations at the European Skeptics Congress 2015 in London

== ESC 17, Poland 2017 ==
Date: 22–24 September

Place: Wrocław

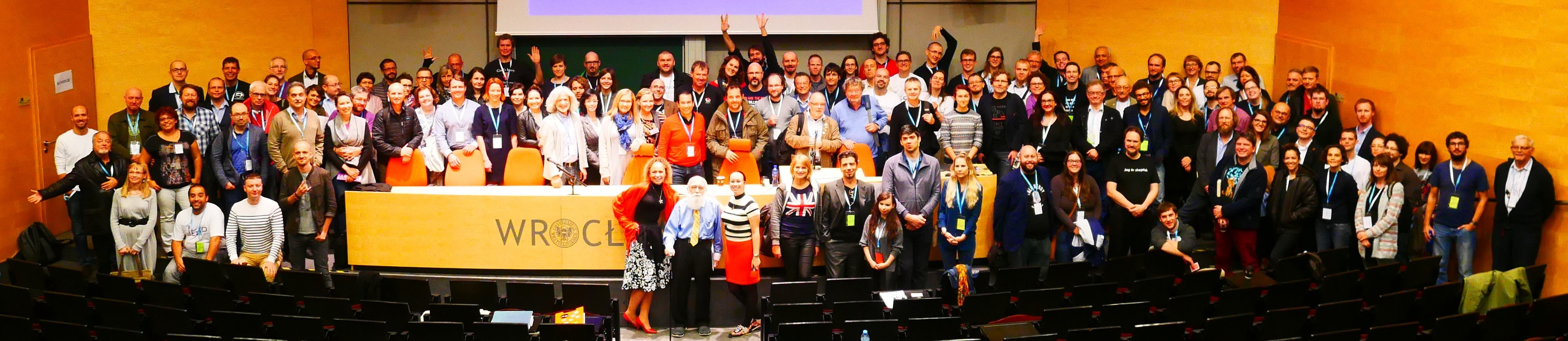
Everyone gathered on stage at the 17th Congress.

Organised by Klub Sceptyków Polskich and Český klub skeptiků Sisyfos

The speakers:

- Deborah Hyde – The Restless Ghost of Wroclaw
- Diego Fontanive – Meta-Memetic Thinking and Skepticism as a Meme
- Eran Segev – The Secrets of an Effective Skeptical Organization
- Gerald Ostdiek – Believing in Biology: The Religious Imagination of Living Things (Including People)
- Holm Gero Hümmler – Relative Quantum Nonsense: Don't be Fooled by False Physics!
- Jakub Kroulik – Exorcism by Hypnosis
- James Randi
- Konrad Szołajski – The Battle with Satan in Poland
- Konrad Talmont-Kamiński – Cognition and the Science/Religion Debate
- Leo Igwe – "Robber Goat", "Bird Woman" and "Cat Woman": How Religion is Hampering Scientific Thinking in Africa
- Marcin Rotkiewicz – Rational Thinking vs. Moral Disgust: Why the Discussion about GMOs Is So Hard and the Scientific Evidence Is Unable to Convince the Public
- Mariusz Błochowiak – Rational justification for the existence of the devil and the exorcism
- Mark Lynas – Why anti-GMO activists are the new climate deniers
- Massimo Polidoro – An interview with James Randi
- Ovidiu Covaciu – How the Romanian anti-vaccine movement threatens Europe
- Petr Jan Vinš – A Priest's View
- Scott Lilienfeld – Tunnel Vision: Confirmation Bias from Courtroom to Boardroom to Bedroom
- Sofie Vanthournout – Talking about Evidence in the Post-Truth Era
- Susan Blackmore – Positive Scepticism: The new science of out-of-body experiences
- Susan Gerbic – We Marched for Science – Now What?
- Tomáš Moravec – How Rational are the Fears of GMOs?
- Zbynek Vybiral – Why Psychology Is Not Only in a Replication Crisis
Recordings of speeches during the 17th European Skeptics Congress
András Gábor Pintér

Diego Fontanive

Eran Segev

Konrad Talmont-Kamiński

Leo Igwe

Marcin Rotkiewicz

Ovidiu Covaciu

Petr Jan Vinš

Scott Lilienfeld

Sofie Vanthournout

Susan Gerbic

Tomáš Moravec

There were also free workshops organised for the public.

== ESC 18, Belgium 2019 ==
Date: 30 August – 1 September

Place: Ghent

- Norbert Aust – Informationsnetzwerk Homöopathie
- Mathijs Beckers – How skepticism helped me become pro-nuclear
- Johan Braeckman – Con men in the art world
- Vanessa Charland – Near-death experiences: actual considerations
- Ovidiu Covaciu – The antivaccination activists, misinformation and the damage done
- Edzard Ernst – The battle against SCAM. Are we winning?
- Farah Focqaert – How con men operate
- André Fougeroux – Is it still possible to rationally address modern agriculture?
- Lieven Gheysen (Aka. Gili)
- Michael Heap – Anomalistic Psychology in the Classroom
- Inge Jeandarme – Dealing with psychopathy
- Catherine de Jong – chairperson for the session The never-ending struggle against quackery
- Michel Naud – Science and decision: towards restoring scientific integrity in policy making
- Jan Willem Nienhuys – Descent into one’s own illusion
- Geerdt Magiels – chairperson for the session on Anomalistic Psychology
- Christine Mohr – When using magicians to study how paranormal beliefs come about
- Iida Ruishalme – Energy and decarbonisation
- Amardeo Sarma – chairperson for the session on Green Skepticism
- Kavin Senapathy – GMOs, modern agriculture, and the People
- Lukas Stalpers – Vitamin B12 clinics: An example of a hype that results in clinics with quackery
- Tim Trachet – chairperson for the session on 30 Years of European Skepticism
- Dirk Vogelaers – Lyme disease: An example of a real disease misused by quacks
- Wietse Wiels – Co-chairing the session The never-ending struggle against quackery
- David Zaruk – Reason has left the building: How the emotional need for certainty and safety has handcuffed research and technology
- Sophie van der Zee – How con men operate in cyberspace

== ESC 19, Austria 2022 ==
Date: 9–11 September

Place: Billrothhaus, Vienna

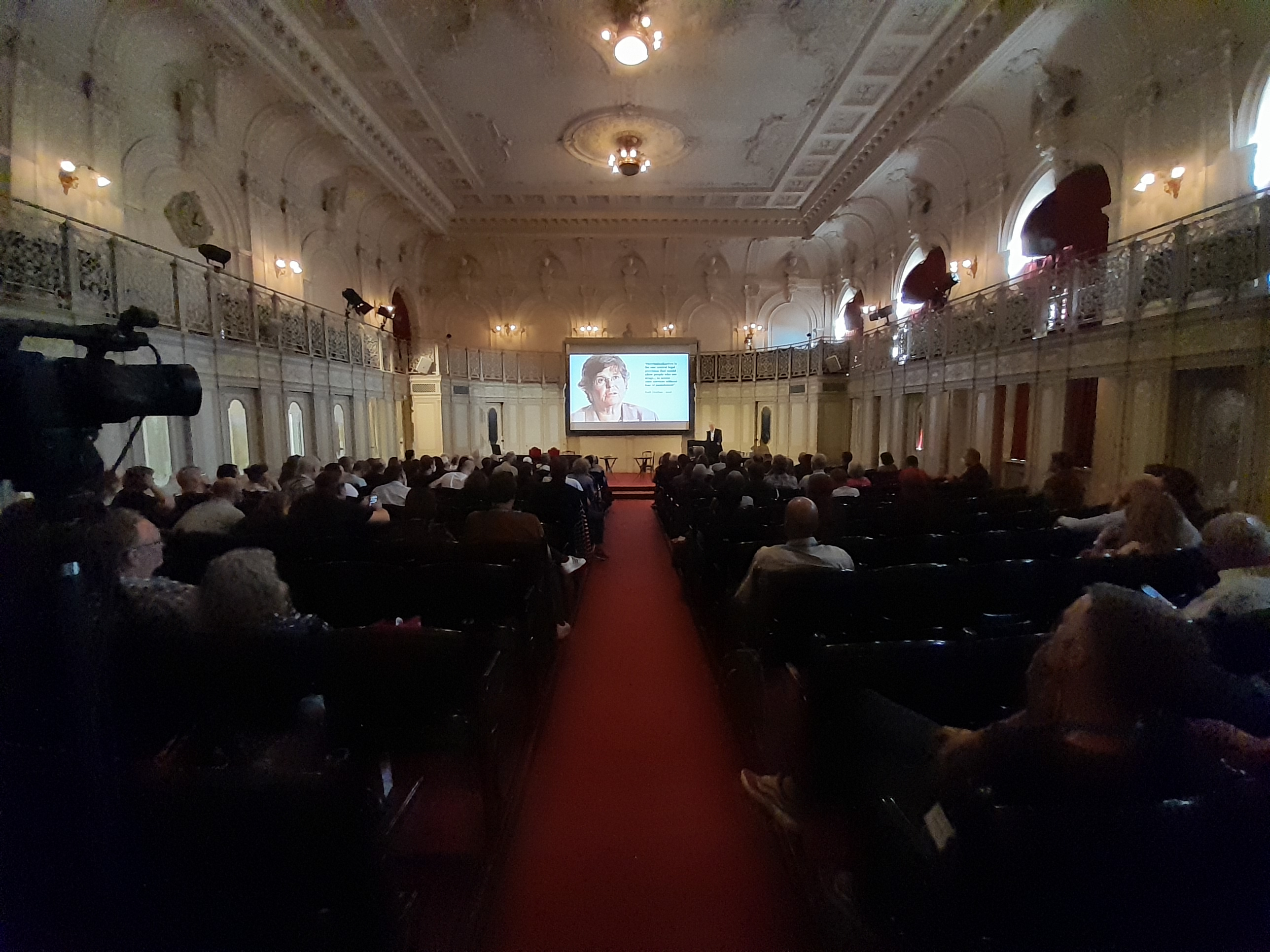
European Skeptics Congress 2022

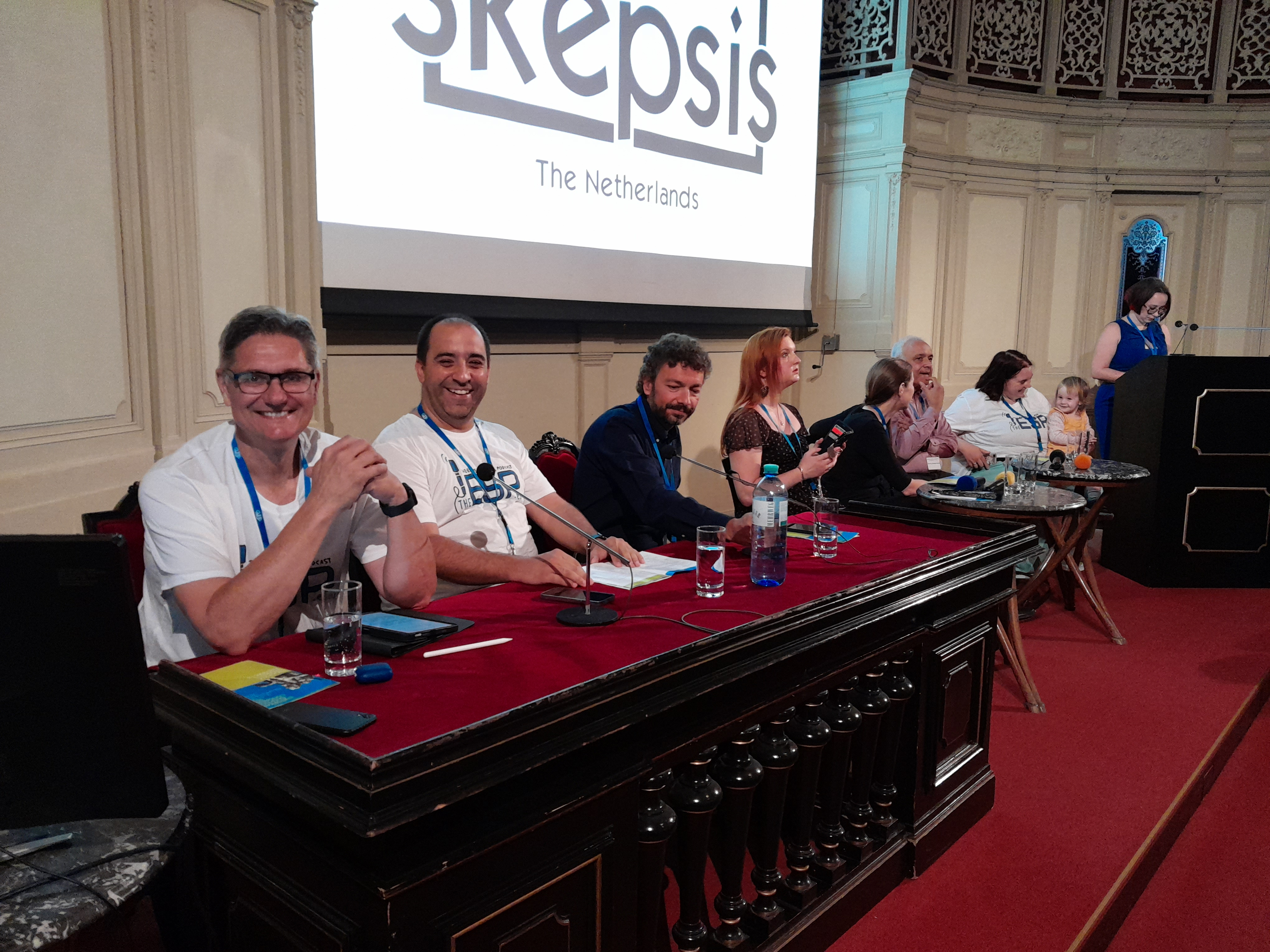
European Skeptics Podcast members and Massimo Polidoro

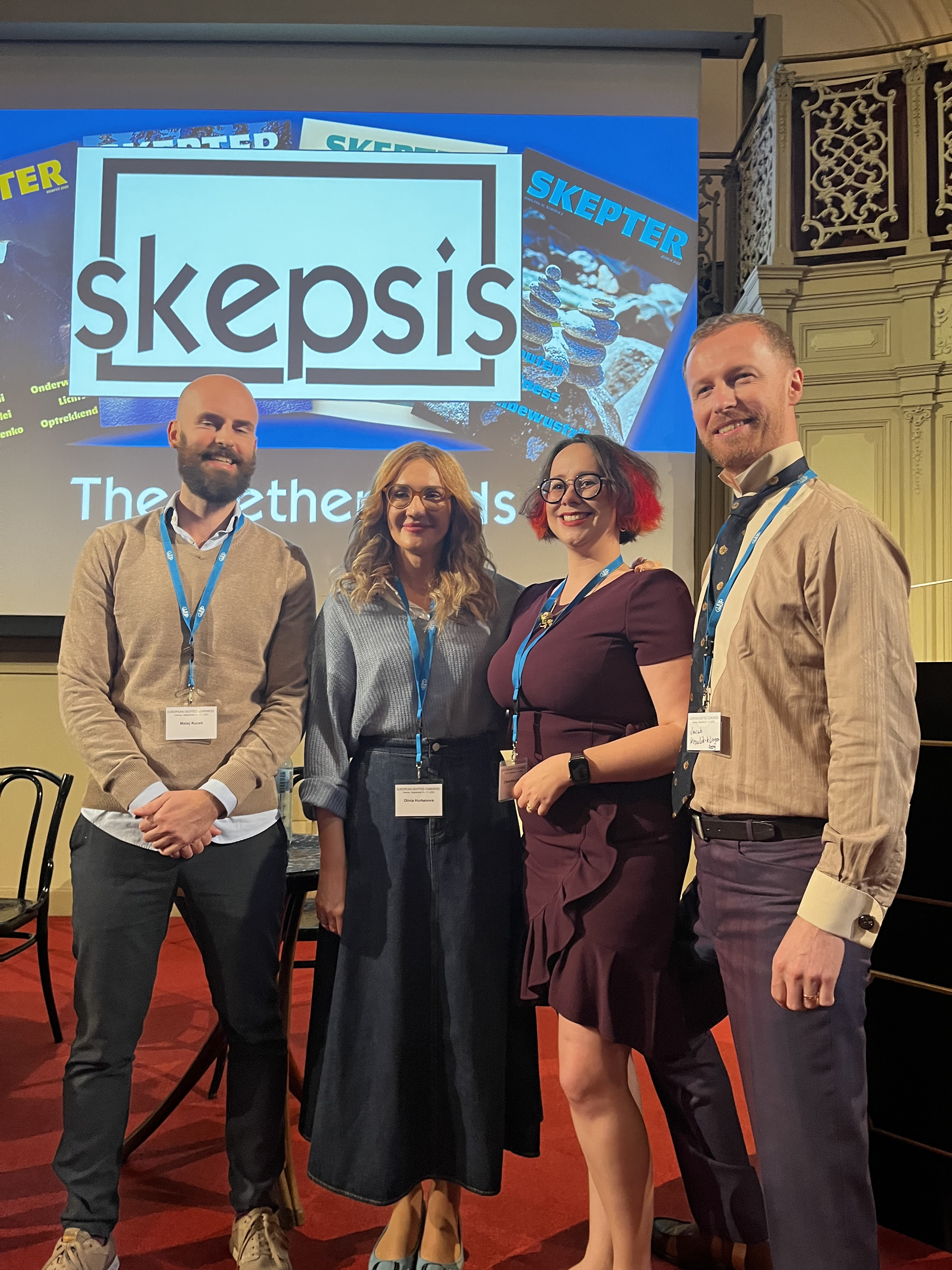
Matej Kucek, Olívia Hurbanová, Claire Klingenberg and Jakub Kroulik

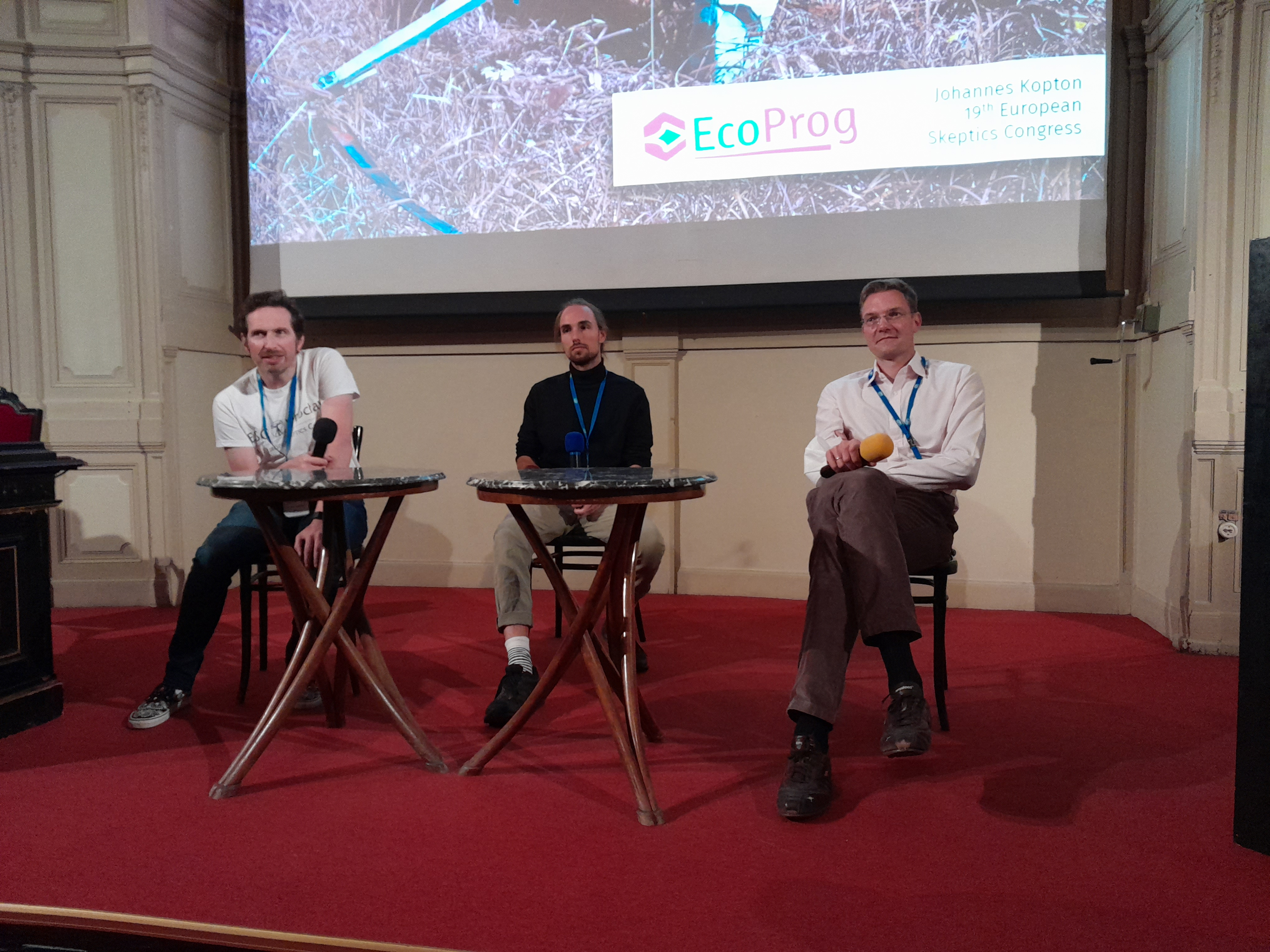
Holm Hümmler, Johannes Kopton Georg Steinhauser

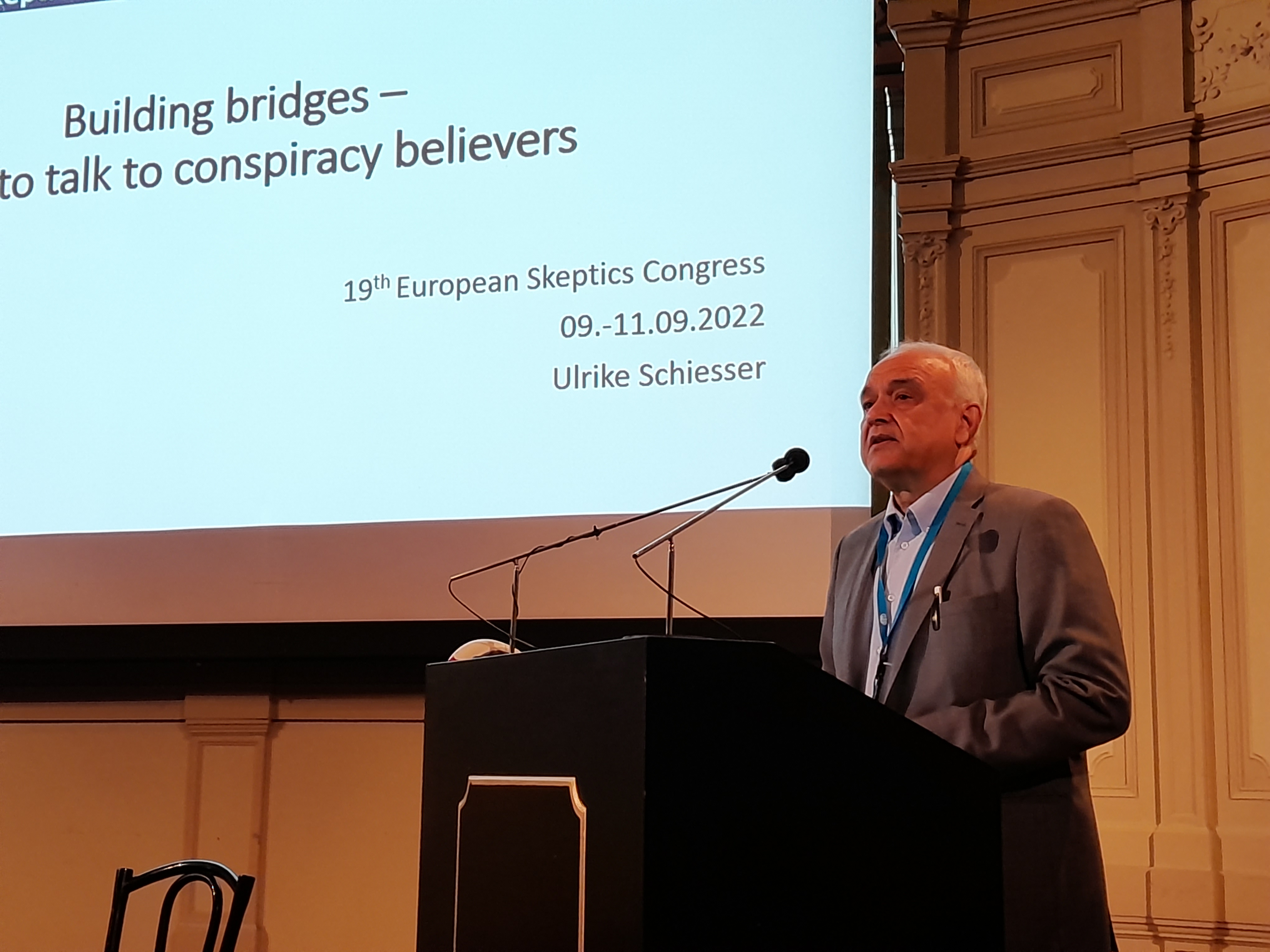
GWUP president, Amardeo Sarma

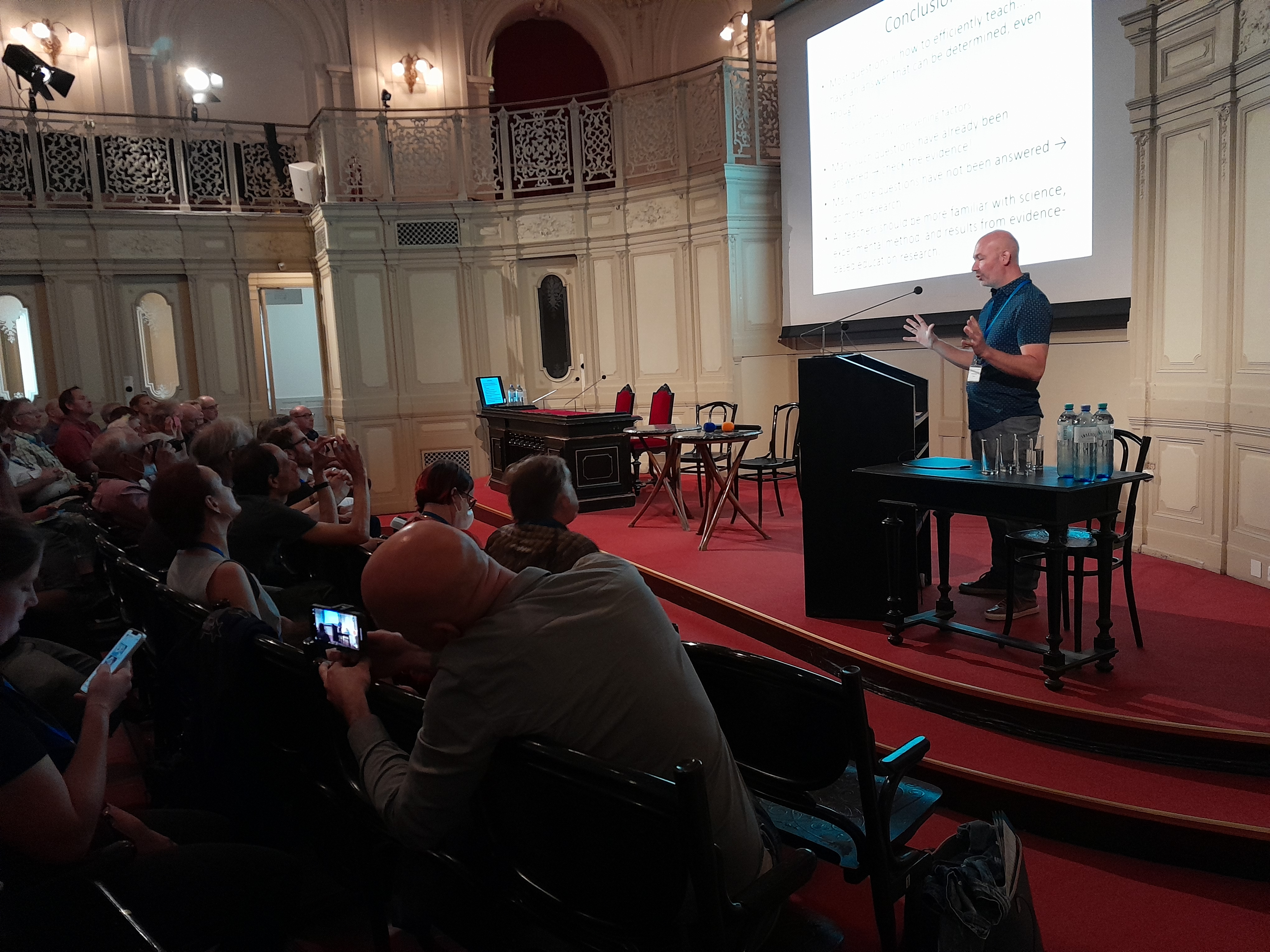
Franck Ramus

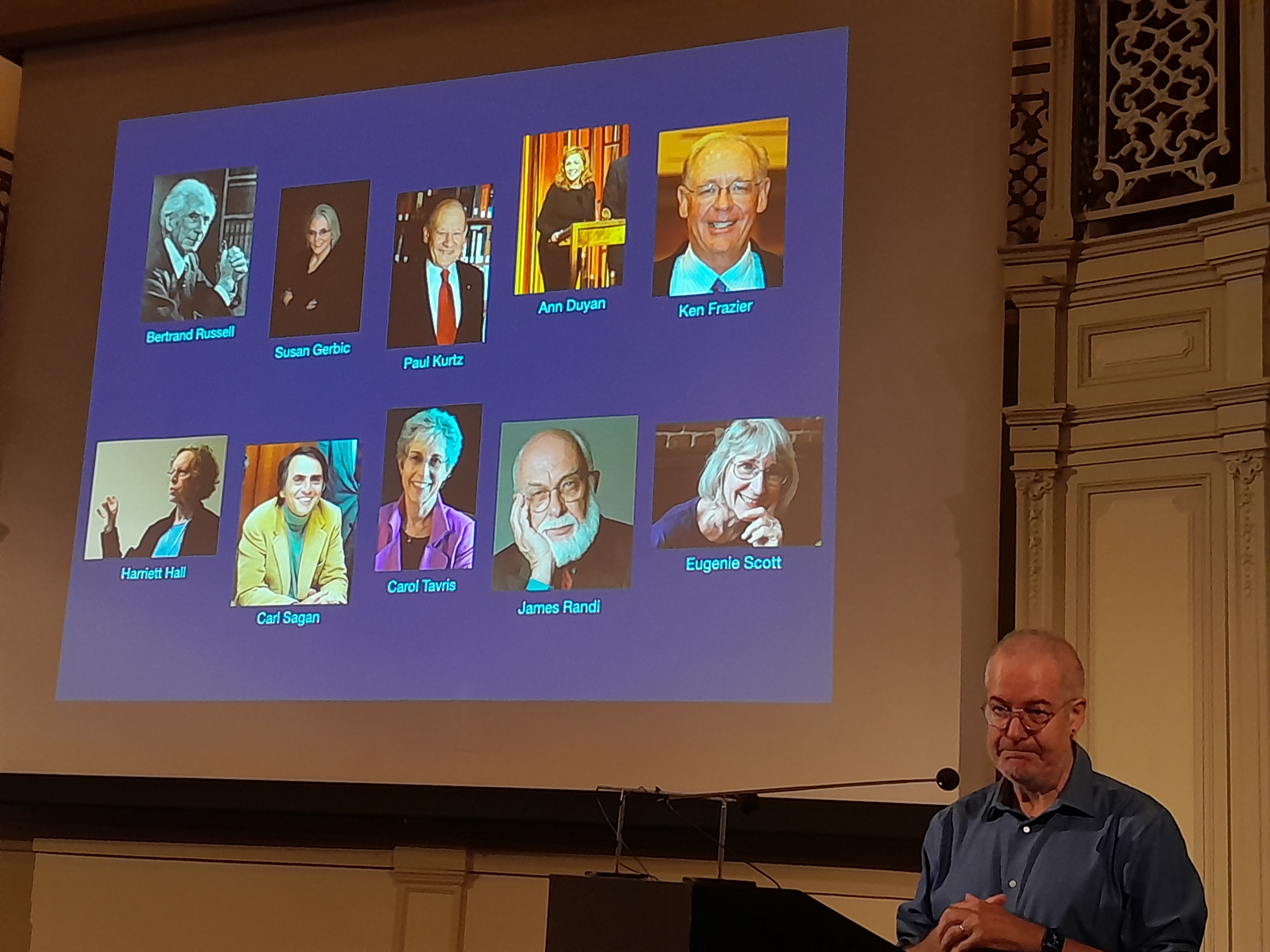
Massimo Pigliucci

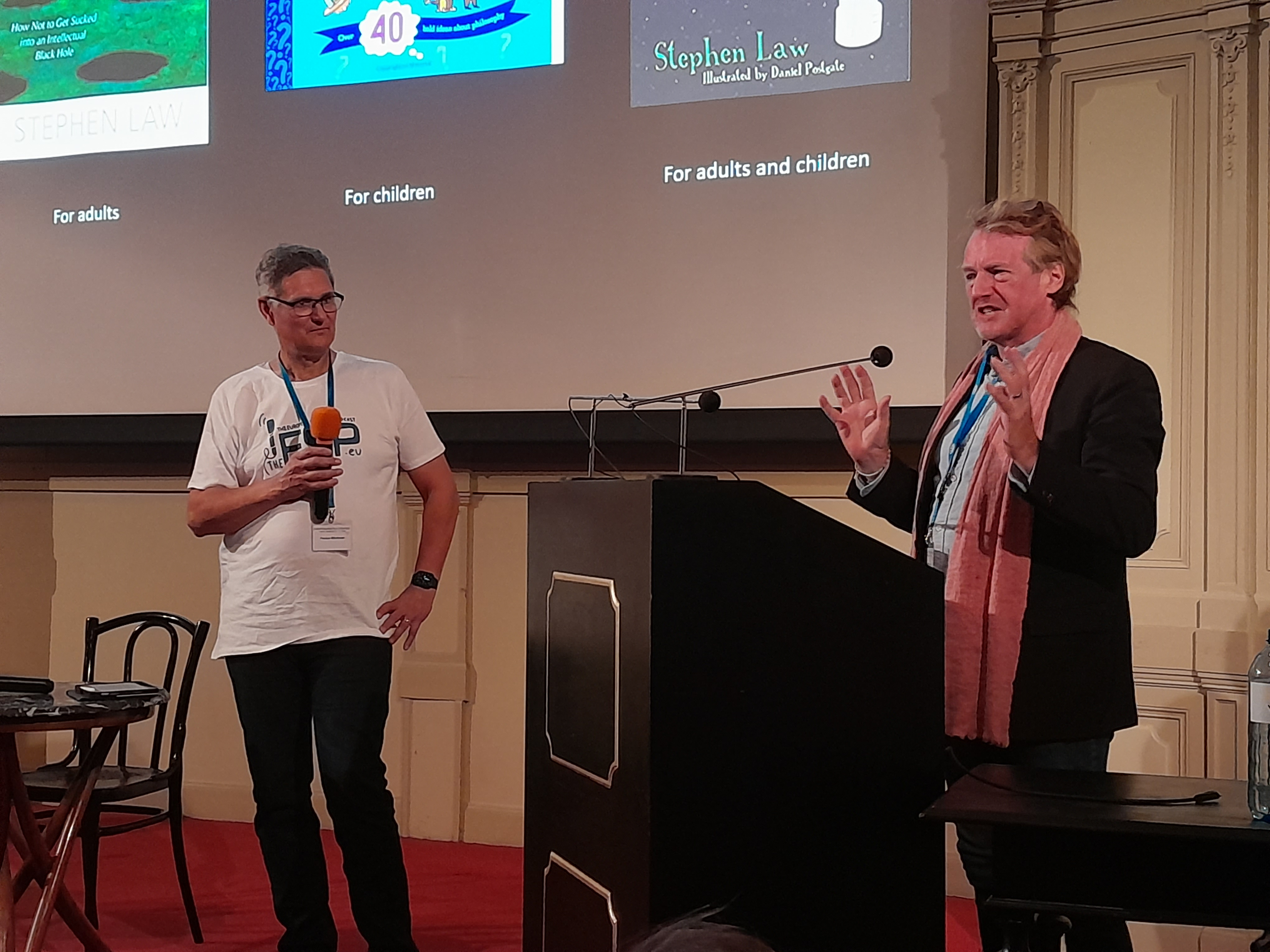
Pontus Böckman and Stephen Law
- Florian Aigner – Why we can trust in Science
- David Badcock – The future – Rational European drug policies
- Pontus Böckman – chairperson for the session Skepticism in the Classroom
- Giulia Conforto – Making science-based decisions in politics (Panel)
- Katalin Cseh – Making science-based decisions in politics (Panel)
- Annika Harrison – The Skeptical Movement in Europe (Panel)
- Alice Howarth – The Skeptical Movement in Europe (Panel)
- Holm Hümmler – 5G mobile networks – the conspiracy myths and what they really do
- Catherine de Jong – chairperson for the session Towards Rational European Drug Policies
- Gábor Kemenesi – The strange relationship of humanity and pandemics in the 21st century
- Claire Klingenberg – chairperson for the session The Skeptical Movement in Europe (Panel)
- Johannes Kopton – “Natural” or sustainable? Agriculture Environmentalism at the Crossroads
- Péter Krekó – The structure of pseudo-scientific revolutions
- Stephen Law – How to raise moral citizens
- Philippe Longchamps – Teacher competence and the combat against misinformation
- Elisa Palazzi – Communicating uncertainty in the science of climate change
- Kellie C. Payne – Making science-based decisions in politics (Panel)
- Massimo Pigliucci – Skepticism as a way of life
- András Gábor Pintér – chairperson for the session Making science-based decisions in politics (Panel)
- Massimo Polidoro – The Skeptical Movement in Europe (Panel)
- Claudia Preis – chairperson for Keynotes Why we can trust in Science and Skepticism as a way of life
- Jan-Willem van Prooijen – Belief in conspiracy theories during a pandemic
- Franck Ramus – What is evidence-based education?
- Sergio Della Sala – The reliable uncertainty of science
- Amardeo Sarma – chairperson for the session Conspiracy Theories
- Ulrike Schiesser – Building bridges – how to talk to conspiracy believers
- Anne Katrin Schlag – The truth about drugs: From misinformation to science
- Georg Steinhauser – The hazards of radiation

== ESC 20, France 2024 ==
Date: 31 May – 2 June

Place: Lyon

Speakers:

- Jean-Luc Bernet - chairperson for the session Europe’s Energy Future
- Myrto Tripathi - The European Nuclear Debate
- Jean-Claude Artus - Nuclear energy … Good for your health?
- Karolina Lisslö Gylfe - Navigating the Energy Landscape: Securing Tomorrow, Without Fossil Fuels
- Amardeo Sarma – chairperson for the session A Good Digital Society
- Nikil Mukerji - Fake News – What is it?
- David Goodman - Data protection and AI in the context of fake news
- Paolo Attivissimo - Harnessing AI for Fake News Detection and Avoidance in Journalism
- Shukun Tokas - Navigating Trustworthiness in Virtual Worlds
- Pontus Böckman – chairperson for the session The Psychology of Beliefs
- Chris French - Anomalous and Paranormal Beliefs: Twenty-Five Years of Research (read by Pontus Böckman)
- Amardeo Sarma - Human population growth – Eight Billion today; where is the limit?
- Michael Heap - Strange Beliefs: ‘Psychopathological’ or Not?
- Catherine de Jong – chairperson for the session Harm From Wellness Culture
- Kevin Smith - How does the culture of self-management and spirituality harm public health?
- Edzard Ernst - So-called alternative medicine: direct and indirect harm
- Les Rose - Misleading the public: can charities be trusted?
- Tim Trachet - The History of European Skeptics Congresses
- Jean-Jacques Ingremeau - chairperson for the session Open Session
- Francesco Grassi - From UFOs to crop circles. How humans became aliens
- Geerdt Magiels - Biology and ideology: at the borderlines of science and certainty. Where science meets opinion
- Elisa Palazzi - Why do we not take the climate crisis seriously?

== ESC 21, United Kingdom 2026 ==
Date: 16–18 October

Place: Liverpool

Related to QED: Question, Explore, Discover in Manchester, 2011–2025

== See also ==
- List of skeptical conferences
- QED: Question, Explore, Discover
- The Amaz!ng Meeting (TAM!)
- CSICon
