= Amardeo Sarma =

German telecommunications engineer and skeptic (born 1955)

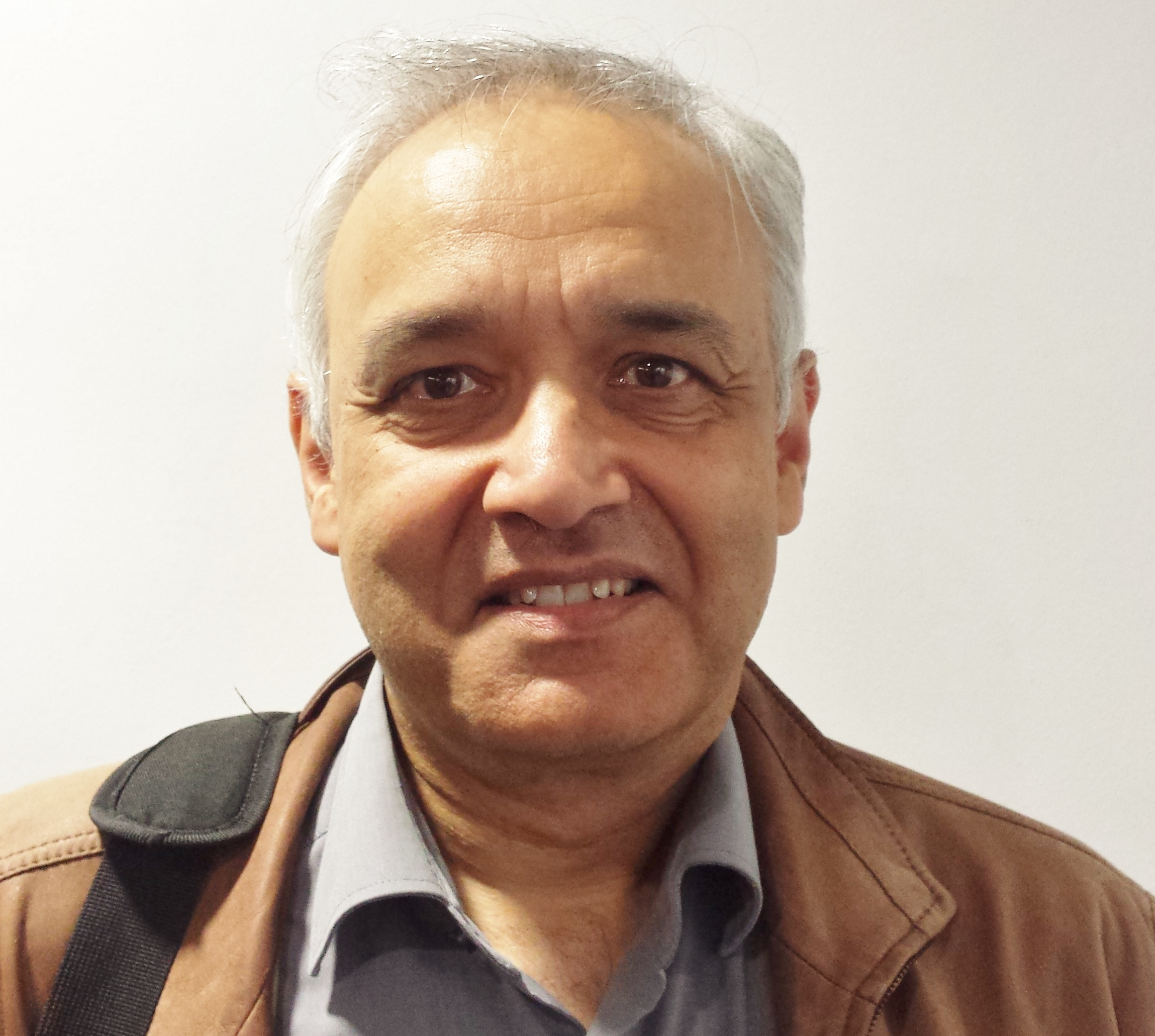
- Sarma at the 15th European Skeptics Congress in London (2015)
- Born: 1955 (age 70–71); Kassel, West Germany
- Education: Technische Universität Darmstadt
- Known for: Leading skeptical activist
- Amardeo Sarma's voice Recorded September 2017

Amardeo Sarma (born 1955) is a qualified engineer for electrical and telecommunications engineering, former chair of both the Gesellschaft zur wissenschaftlichen Untersuchung von Parawissenschaften (GWUP) and the European Council of Skeptical Organisations. Professionally, he works for NEC Laboratories Europe. Sarma is a CSI Fellow and sits on the Committee for Skeptical Inquiry's Executive Council.

== Biography ==
=== Education ===
Sarma was born 1955 in Kassel, West Germany. He earned his bachelor's degree in technology at the Indian Institute of Technology Delhi, and obtained the title of qualified engineer (Diplom-Ingenieur) at the Technische Universität Darmstadt.

=== NEC ===
As president of the TDL Executive Board and a General Manager at NEC Laboratories Europe, Sarma was present at the Trust in the Digital World and the Cyber Security & Privacy (CSP) EU Forum 2013, that addressed the issue of fighting cybercrime.

=== Skeptical movement ===
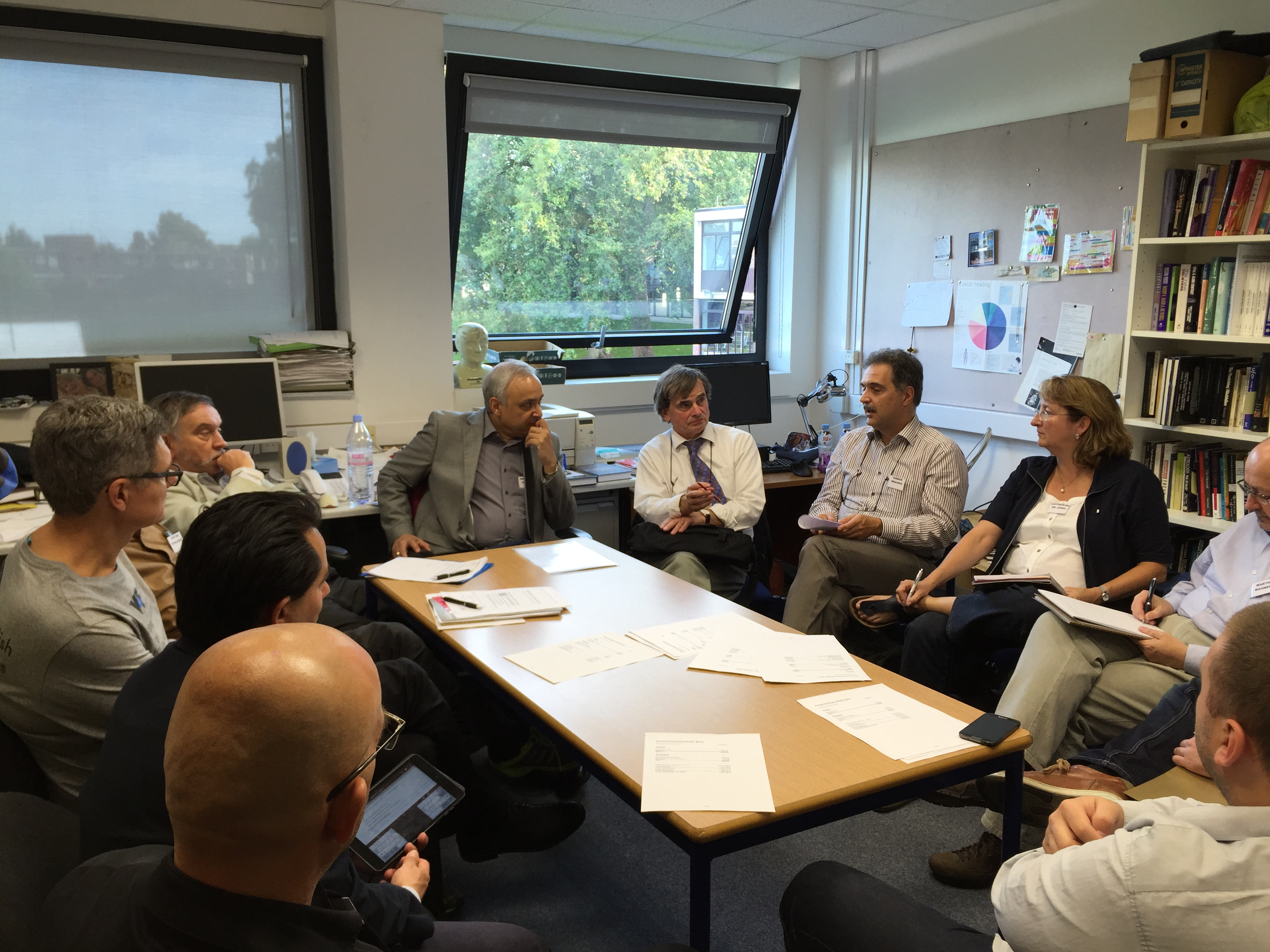
Sarma at an ECSO meeting

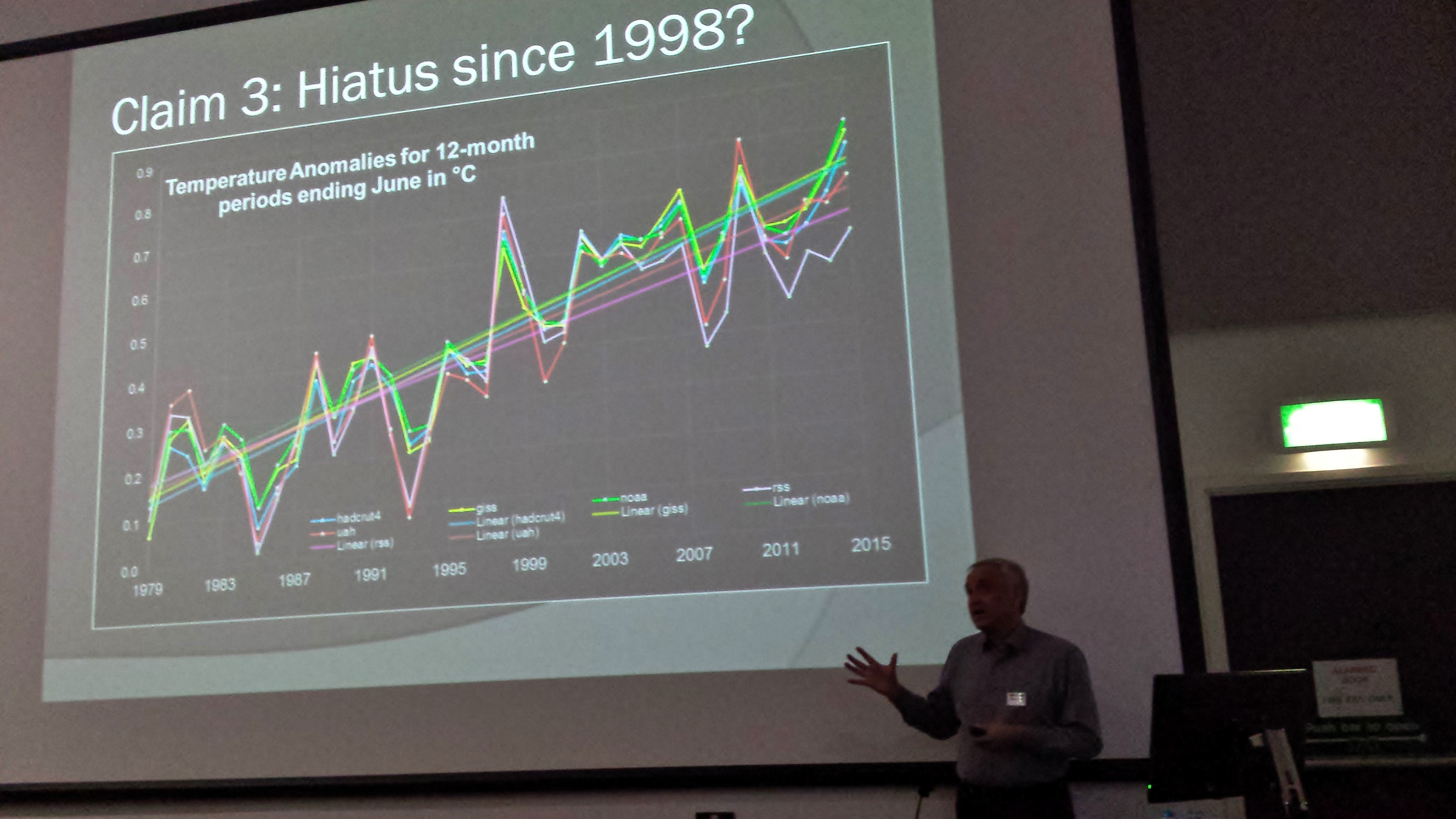
Sarma lectures about climate change denial.

From his early childhood on, Sarma was very interested in science and scientific controversies, and read books by Erich von Däniken and Charles Berlitz about the Bermuda Triangle. However, he then came across books that took up the issue more seriously and scientifically, especially when he read The Bermuda Triangle Mystery – Solved (1975) by Larry Kusche. This got him thinking: "How come this information was not available to me before? At that point I decided that something's got to be done to provide more critical, skeptical and science-based information to the public, so that people don't get fooled the way I was." In 1982, he read an article by Douglas Hofstadter in Spektrum der Wissenschaft, the German version of Scientific American, on the huge difference in quality between the National Enquirer and the Skeptical Inquirer. It was through subscribing to the latter magazine that he found his way to the skeptical movement. In 1987, he was a founding member of the GWUP. He decided to found the GWUP after finding out that the research project "Influence of Earth radiation, geomagnetism and cosmic effects on human health", which he considered to be extremely unscientific, was being funded by the German government. Sarma began as the managing director of the GWUP, and since 2008 he has been its chair. In 1994, he was also co-initiator of the European skeptical umbrella ECSO, serving as its chair between 2000 and 2013, and as its treasurer thereafter.

In 2018, Sarma provided some perspective on the state of the skeptical movement by addressing "the essence of contemporary skepticism and [highlighting] the vital nonpartisan and science-based role of skeptics in preventing deception and harm."

In 2021, Sarma with the German Skeptics, created a nationwide poll based on an earlier 2001 poll by the Lutheran Magazine, Chrismon. The poll found that beliefs in therapies such as Ayurveda, Bach flower remedies and homeopathy have all decreased since the original 2001 poll. The percent of people who believe in dowsing, UFOs, telekinesis, clairvoyance and seances have also decreased. The poll did identify 5G development as a fear for some respondents.

In 2023, Sarma retired as chair of GWUP.

In 2024, the Committee for Skeptical Inquiry (CSI) named Sarma the European representative, he was already a member of CSI's Executive Council and a CSI fellow.

=== 10:23 Campaign ===
In 2011, he coordinated the 10:23 Campaign in Germany, in which groups of people in 27 countries overdosed on homeopathic preparations, in an effort to show to the public that homeopathy does not work.

=== Appearances ===
In 2017, Amardeo Sarma appeared at the 17th European Skeptics Congress (ESC) in Old Town Wrocław, Poland. The congress was organised by the Klub Sceptyków Polskich (Polish Skeptics Club) and Český klub skeptiků Sisyfos (Czech Skeptic's Club). At the congress he hosted a panel on exorcisms that included Mariusz Błochowiak, Konrad Szołajski, Jakub Kroulík and Chris French.

== Publications ==
- Belina F., Hogrefe D. & Sarma A., Sdl With Applications from Protocol Specification (Bcs Practitioner Series). Upper Saddle River: Prentice Hall 1991. ISBN 0137858906
- Faergemand O. & Sarma A., Sdl '93: Using Objects : Proceedings of the Sixth Sdl Forum Darmstadt, Germany, 11–15 October 1993. Amsterdam: North-Holland (Elsevier) 1993. ISBN 0444814868
- Braek R. & Sarma A., SDL '95 with MSC in CASE. Amsterdam: Elsevier Science 1995. ISBN 0444822690
- Ellsberger J, Hogrefe D. & Sarma A., SDL: Formal Object-Oriented Language for Communicating Systems. Upper Saddle River: Prentice Hall 1997. ISBN 0136213847
- Cavalli A. & A. Sarma A., SDL '97: Time for Testing: SDL, MSC and Trends. Amsterdam: Elsevier Science 1997. ISBN 0444828168
