= Chris French =

Psychologist specialising in paranormal beliefs (born 1956)

Christopher French
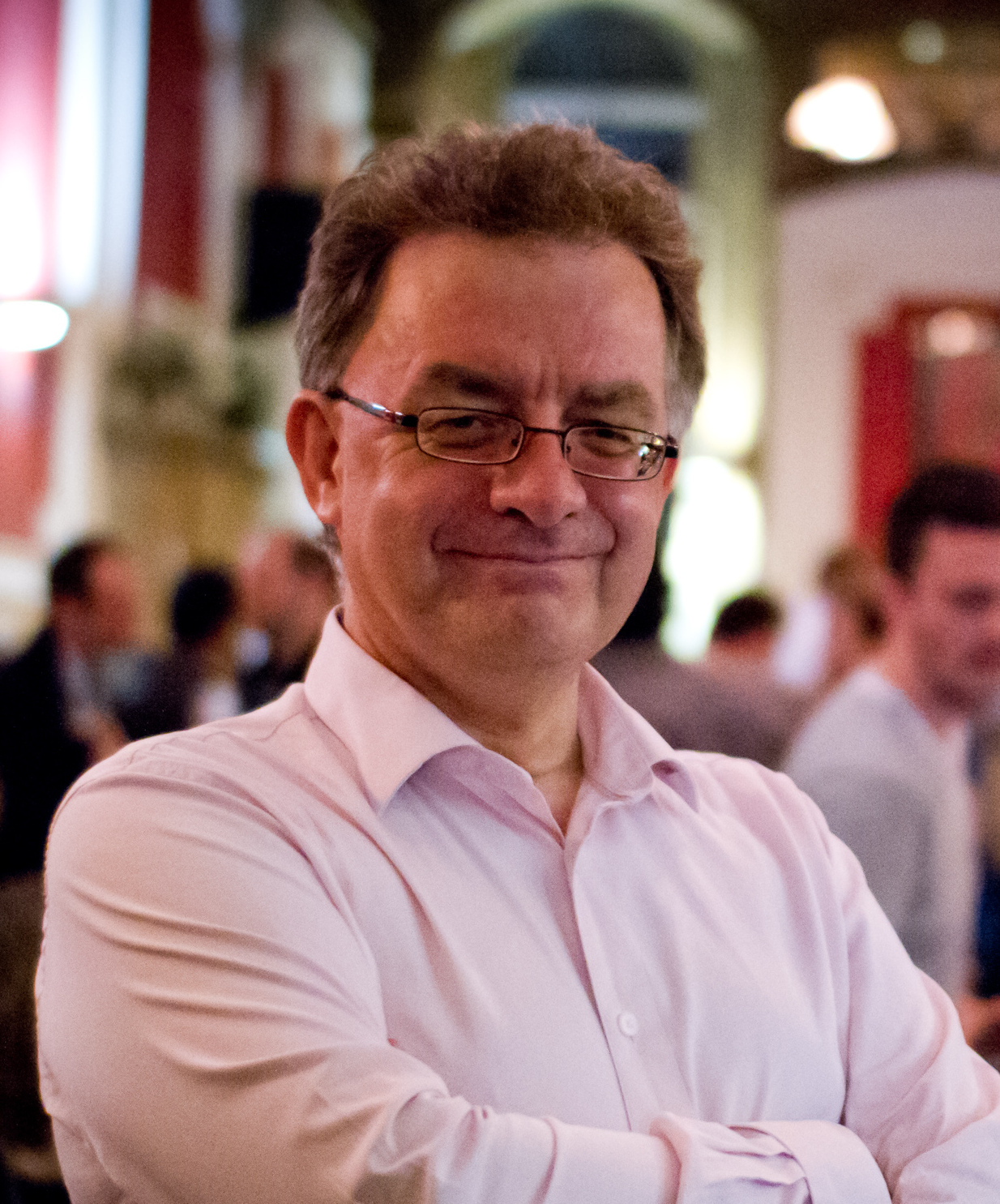
- French in 2011
- Born: Christopher Charles French
- Education: B.A., PhD, CPsychol, FBPsS, FRSA
- Occupation: Psychologist
- Employers: Goldsmiths; Birkbeck College; University of London
- Organization: Anomalistic Psychology Research Unit
- Known for: The Skeptic (UK) magazine
- Awards: Distinguished Supporter of Humanists UK
- Chris French's voice recorded September 2015
- Website: www.gold.ac.uk/psychology/staff/french

Christopher (Chris) Charles French is a British psychologist who is prominent in the field of anomalistic psychology, with a focus on the psychology of paranormal beliefs and anomalous experiences. In addition to his academic activities, French frequently appears on radio and television to provide a skeptical perspective on paranormal claims.

He is currently a Professor Emeritus of Psychology at Goldsmiths College, University of London, and the head of the Anomalistic Psychology Research Unit, which he founded in 2000. French emphasizes the importance of understanding why people believe in the paranormal and advocates for taking these claims seriously to explore the underlying psychological factors involved. He has conducted research on various paranormal phenomena, including psychic abilities, ghosts, UFO abductions, and astrology. French is also involved in academia, teaching courses on psychology, parapsychology, and pseudoscience. He has published numerous articles and chapters in reputable psychology journals and has presented his work at conferences and symposia.

French is also active in science communication, having served as the Editor-in-Chief of The Skeptic magazine and written columns for The Guardian newspaper. He has made numerous appearances on science programs, documentaries, and discussion panels to discuss skeptical perspectives on paranormal phenomena.

== Career ==
After French completed his PhD he taught adult education classes in which he also addressed astrology and extrasensory perception.

French is currently Professor Emeritus of Psychology at Goldsmiths College, University of London, and is head of their Anomalistic Psychology Research Unit which he founded in 2000.

On the importance of anomalistic psychology he said in an interview on The Skeptic Zone,

Opinion poll after opinion poll tell us that the majority of population, in one way or another, do express belief in the paranormal. Most people, in any survey, will endorse at least one paranormal claim. Now, either that means that paranormal forces really do exist, or it's telling us something really interesting about human psychology. So, either way, we should definitely take these types of claims seriously and try to understand what is going on.

The focus of his current research is the psychology of paranormal beliefs and anomalous experiences. In addition to academic activities, such as conference presentations and invited talks in other departments, he frequently appears on radio and television presenting a sceptical view of paranormal claims. He has been consulted as an expert on a wide range of such claims including psychic abilities, recovered memory, telepathy, faith healing, past life regression, ghosts, UFO abductions, out-of-body experiences, astrology and so on.

=== Academia ===
French teaches a course entitled Psychology, Parapsychology and Pseudoscience as part of the BSc (Hons) Psychology programmes at both Goldsmiths College and Birkbeck College. He is a Chartered Psychologist and a Fellow of the British Psychological Society.

During his 2014 interview for the Skeptic Zone podcast, French acknowledged that, as a sceptic, he believed in paranormal activities until he became more aware of the psychology behind why people believe, a point made clear to him through a book written by Professor of Psychology James Alcock:

I kind of fell into this trap myself...I used to be a believer, a true believer until quite well into my adulthood. And it was reading one particular book by James Alcock, called Parapsychology: Science or Magic, that made me realize there was another way of explaining all these unusual experiences, and one that actually made a lot of sense to me!

He has authored or co-authored over 80 articles and chapters dealing with a wide variety of subjects in psychology, his work has been published in the Journal of Abnormal Psychology, the Quarterly Journal of Experimental Psychology, the British Journal of Psychology and the British Journal of Clinical Psychology.

In August 1996, he organised and chaired an integrated paper session on the topic of The Psychology of Paranormal and Pseudoscientific Beliefs at the XXVI International Congress of Psychology in Montreal.

He also contributed to a symposium on The Psychology of Anomalous Experience at the British Science Association annual British Science Festival at the University of Birmingham in September 1996.

In July 1997, he chaired a symposium on The Psychology of Paranormal Belief at the Fifth European Congress of Psychology in Dublin. He presented a paper at a conference on Paranormal and Superstitious Beliefs: A Skeptical Examination at Manchester Metropolitan University on Friday 13, November, 1998.

In February 1999, he contributed to a symposium of the Royal Statistical Society (which he co-organised). In July 1999, he co-organised and presented a paper at a half-day conference on Parapsychology: Current Status and Future Prospects at Goldsmiths College and gave a paper at the Sixth European Congress of Psychology in Rome. In February 2001, he gave an invited presentation to the Institute for Cultural Research at the Royal Society of Medicine and he has organised two symposia at major conferences (Glasgow, March 2001; London, July 2001).

In 2001, French tested the effects of crystal healing with the results suggesting that they are largely placebo effects. 80 volunteers were given a questionnaire to gauge their level of belief about paranormal phenomena. Later they were given what they were told was a genuine crystal, and asked to meditate for 10 minutes and then report the sensations they experienced. Half of the subjects had actually been given fake plastic crystals instead. French found no difference between the feelings reported between the two groups.

In 2004, French and colleagues conducted an experiment involving electromagnetic fields (EMF) and extremely low frequency sound waves (infrasound) phenomena that have been associated with allegedly haunted locations, the experiment did not establish a causal relationship between these phenomena and experiences of the subjects.

A study, led by French and published in 2008, explored the psychology of people who believed they had been abducted by aliens.

In January 2010, French was elected as a Fellow of the Committee for Skeptical Inquiry

French, Richard Wiseman and Stuart Ritchie each tried to replicate Daryl Bem's claim about psychic powers independently and failed at publishing their findings in high-profile journals. This is a common problem with publishing negative results, as novel research is more sought-after. They subsequently submitted their paper to PLOS One.

=== Science communication ===
French is a former Editor-in-Chief of The Skeptic (UK) magazine. He presided over a relaunch, in 2009, in which the magazine expanded to 40 pages and assembled an editorial advisory board, including many big names (e.g. Tim Minchin, Stephen Fry, Richard Wiseman, Simon Singh). From 2009 to 2016, French has been a columnist for The Guardian newspaper exploring scepticism and anomalistic psychology.

He has appeared on various science programmes (e.g. Equinox, ScienceNow, All in the Mind) and documentaries (e.g. Heart of the Matter, Everyman) as well as numerous discussion programmes (e.g. Esther; The Time, The Place; Kilroy; This Morning).

In 1997, he was one of three sceptics sitting on a panel for a 90-minute live debate on UFOs broadcast at peak viewing time by the Strange but True? team to mark the 50th anniversary of UFOs.

In 1998, he took part in an investigation of reincarnation claims amongst the Druze people of Lebanon, broadcast as part of the To the Ends of the Earth series. This involved spending around three weeks in Lebanon with a film crew.

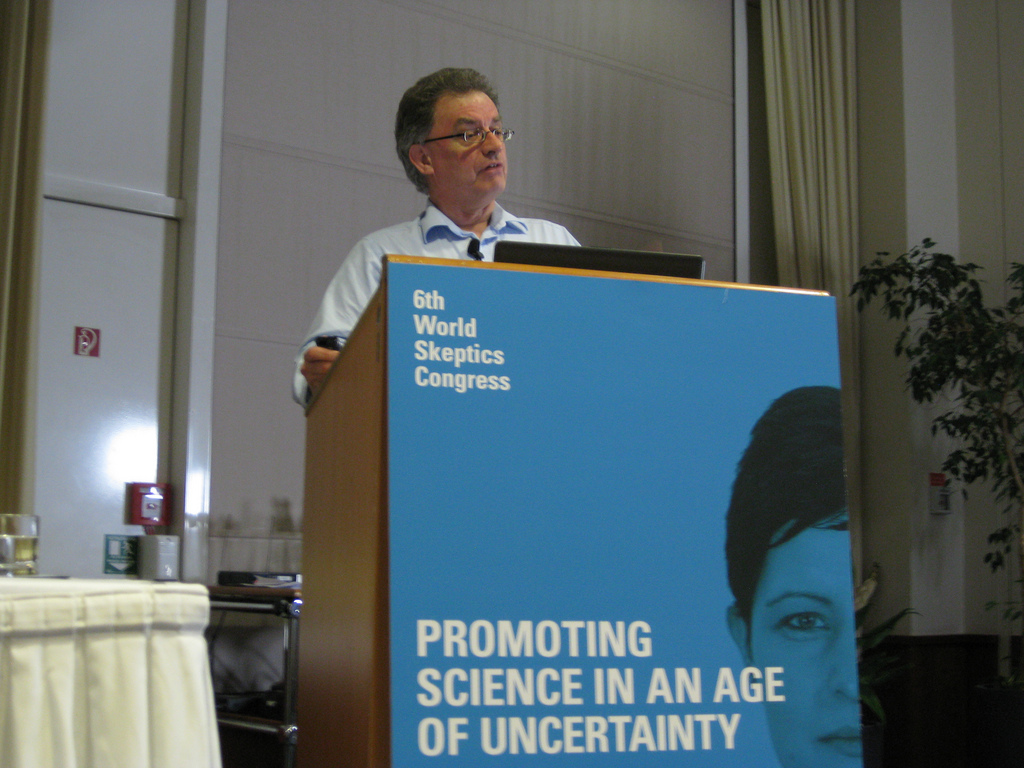
Chris French at the 2012 World Skeptics Congress in Berlin

He made regular appearances on ITV's programme Haunted Homes. He also makes appearances in the Channel 4 documentary series Tony Robinson and the Paranormal.

In 2012, Chris French established the Greenwich branch of Skeptics in the Pub, which is currently the only active Skeptics in the Pub organization in London.

In November 2013, French was featured as the keynote speaker for the 2013 Australian Skeptics National Convention in Canberra.

In 2017, French attended the 17th European Skeptics Congress (ESC) in Old Town Wrocław, Poland. This was organised by the Klub Sceptyków Polskich (Polish Skeptics Club) and Český klub skeptiků Sisyfos (Czech Skeptic's Club). Here he appeared on a panel to discuss exorcisms. The panel was chaired by Amardeo Sarma and included Mariusz Błochowiak, Konrad Szołajski and Jakub Kroulík.

== Works ==
=== Book ===
- —; Stone, Anna, eds. (2014). Anomalistic Psychology: Exploring Paranormal Belief and Experience. London: Palgrave MacMillan. ISBN 9781403995711.
- — (2024). The Science of Weird Shit: Why Our Minds Conjure the Paranormal. Cambridge, Massachusetts: The MIT Press. ISBN 9780262048361.

=== Co-edited book ===
- —; Grossman, Wendy M., eds. (2010). Why Statues Weep. The Best of The Skeptic. London: The Philosophy Press. ISBN 9780953761128.

=== Selected book sections ===
- — (2004). "Parapsychology". In Kuper, Adam; Kuper, Jessica (eds.). The Social Science Encyclopedia. London: Routledge. pp. 702–703. ISBN 9780415320962.
- — (2004). "Skepticism". In Henry, Jane (ed.). Parapsychology. Research on Exceptional Experiences. London: Routledge. pp. 80–89. ISBN 978-0415213608.
- —; Santomauro, J. (2007). "Something Wicked This Way Comes. Causes and Interpretations of Sleep Paralysis". In Sala, Sergio Della (ed.). Tall Tales About the Mind and Brain. Separating Fact from Fiction. Oxford University Press. pp. 380–398. ISBN 9780198568773.
- —; Wilson, Krissy (2007). "Cognitive Factors Underlying Paranormal Beliefs and Experiences". In Sala, Sergio Della (ed.). Tall Tales About the Mind and Brain. Separating Fact from Fiction. Oxford University Press. pp. 3–22. ISBN 9780198568773.
- — (2009). "Anomalistic Psychology". In Cardwell, Mike; Clark, Liz; Meldrum, Claire; Wadeley, Alison (eds.). Psychology for A2 Level for AQA (A) (4th ed.). New York: HarperCollins. pp. 472–505. ISBN 9780007255030.
- — (2010). "Reflections of a (Relatively) Moderate Skeptic". In Krippner, Stanley; Friedman, Harris L. (eds.). Debating Psychic Experience: Human Potential Or Human Illusion?. Santa Barbara, CA: ABC-CLIO. pp. 53–64. ISBN 9780313392610.
- — (2010). "Missing the point?". In Krippner, Stanley; Friedman, Harris L. (eds.). Debating Psychic Experience: Human Potential Or Human Illusion?. Santa Barbara, CA: ABC-CLIO. pp. 149–152. ISBN 9780313392610.

=== Selected articles ===
- —; Beaumont, J. Graham (March 1984). "A critical review of EEG coherence studies of hemisphere function". International Journal of Psychophysiology. 1 (3): 241–54. doi:10.1016/0167-8760(84)90044-8. PMID 6394561.
- —; Beaumont, J. Graham (November 1987). "The reaction of psychiatric patients to computerized assessment". British Journal of Clinical Psychology. 26 (4): 267–78. doi:10.1111/j.2044-8260.1987.tb01360.x. PMID 3427249.
- Richards, Anne; — (1991). "Effects of encoding and anxiety on implicit and explicit memory performance". Personality and Individual Differences. 12 (2): 131–9. doi:10.1016/0191-8869(91)90096-T.
- Richards, Anne; — (1992). "An anxiety-related bias in semantic activation when processing threat/neutral homographs". Quarterly Journal of Experimental Psychology, Section A. 45 (3): 503–25. doi:10.1080/02724989208250625. PMID 1308736. S2CID 42520099.
- Richards, Anne; —; Johnson, Wendy; Naparstek, Jennifer; Williams, Jane (November 1992). "Effects of mood manipulation and anxiety on performance of an emotional Stroop task". British Journal of Psychology. 83 (4): 479–91. doi:10.1111/j.2044-8295.1992.tb02454.x. PMID 1486362.
- French, Christopher C.; Richards, Anne; Scholfield, Emma J. C. (November 1996). "Hypomania, anxiety and the emotional Stroop". British Journal of Clinical Psychology. 35 (4): 617–26. doi:10.1111/j.2044-8260.1996.tb01217.x. PMID 8955547.
- Hadwin, Julie; Frost, Susie; —; Richards, Anne (August 1997). "Cognitive processing and trait anxiety in typically developing children: Evidence for an interpretation bias". Journal of Abnormal Psychology. 106 (3): 486–90. doi:10.1037/0021-843X.106.3.486. PMID 9241952.
- Keogh, Edmund; — (March–April 2001). "Test anxiety, evaluative stress, and susceptibility to distraction from threat". European Journal of Personality. 15 (2): 123–41. doi:10.1002/per.400. S2CID 144497181.
- Richards, Anne; —; Calder, Andrew J.; Webb, Ben; et al. (September 2002). "Anxiety-related bias in the classification of emotionally ambiguous facial expressions". Emotion. 2 (3): 273–87. doi:10.1037/1528-3542.2.3.273. PMID 12899360.
- Keogh, Edmund; Bond, Frank W.; —; Richards, Anne; et al. (2004). "Test anxiety, susceptibility to distraction and examination performance". Anxiety, Stress, & Coping. 17 (3): 241–52. doi:10.1080/10615300410001703472. S2CID 144089694.
