= Konrad Szołajski =

Polish film director and screenwriter

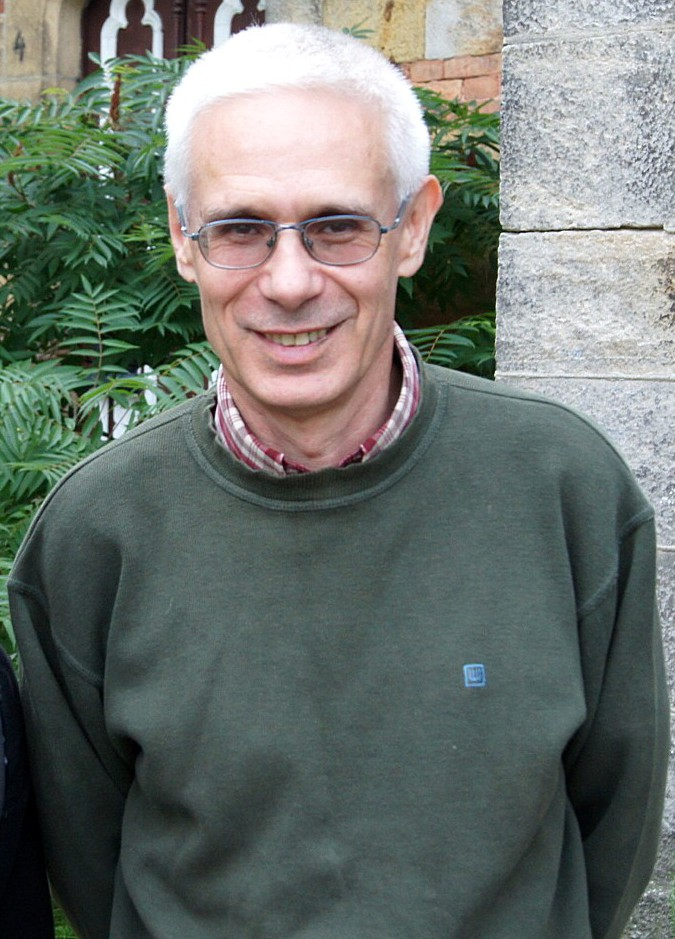
- Born: 25 May 1956 (age 70); Warsaw, Poland
- Occupations: Film director, screenwriter, film producer
- Awards: #Awards

Konrad Szołajski, pseudonym Piotr Kaczorowski (born 25 May 1956), is a Polish film director and screenwriter.

He completed Polish studies at the University of Warsaw in 1979 and later studied at the British National Film School. He is an author of fictional and documentary films.

He is the son of Lucjan Szołajski, a film and television voice artist.

== Education and research ==
He completed Polish studies at the University of Warsaw in 1979.

In 1985, he received a master's degree in film and television directing from the University of Silesia in Katowice. Between 1985 and 1987 he studied post-production, directing and filmmaking at the National Film School in the United Kingdom. In 2012, he defended his doctoral degree at the Radio and Television Faculty of the University of Silesia. Then in 1993-94 he taught filmmaking classes at the Department of Polish Culture at the University of Warsaw. Since 2011, he has been teaching at the Faculty of Radio and Television of the University of Silesia and at the Film and Television Directing Department of the National Film School in Łódź.

== Awards ==
In the years 1993-1999 he was nominated three times for the Złote Lwy award.

In 2002 he received the Studio AVA Film award in the Media Festival “Man in Danger” for his documentary Zawód: posłanka.

In 2011 he received the Aleksander Kamiński award in the Media Festival "Man in Danger" for the documentary I Bóg stworzył sex. In the same year he was nominated for the Złote Grono award for the documentary Uwodziciele.

In 2012 he received a Złota Kaczka nomination (Best Picture and Best Screenplay) for his film Kop głębiej.

In 2016 he was a Złota Kaczka and Złote Grono nominee for the documentary The Battle with Satan (Polish Walka z Szatanem).

== Documentary about exorcisms ==
In 2015, Konrad Szołajski created a documentary The Battle with Satan (Polish: Walka z Szatanem) about exorcisms. This caused media interest about the film and the problem of exorcisms in Poland. In December 2016 the German television 3sat issued a program on the subject Exorzismus-Boom in Polen (Boom of exorcisms in Poland), in which Konrad Szołajski talked about exorcisms and his documentary.

== Lectures and appearances ==
In 2017, Szołajski attended the seventeenth European Skeptics Congress (ESC) in Old Town Wrocław, Poland. Here, he joined Mariusz Błochowiak, Jakub Kroulík and Chris French on a panel on exorcisms which was chaired by Amardeo Sarma. Later, Szołajski showed the audience his documentary "The Battle with Satan". It followed several people who believed that their life problems could be cured by exorcisms.

== Filmography ==
=== Fictional ===
- Kop głębiej (Dig deeper) (2011)
- O czym szumią kierpce (What are the mocassins rustling about) (2000)
- Operacja Koza (Operation: goat) (1999)
- Musisz żyć (You have to live) (1997)
- Człowiek z… (The man from...) (1993)

=== Documentary ===
- The Battle with Satan (2015)
- Głosy (Voices) (2012)
- I Bóg stworzył seks… (And God created sex...) (2011)
- Niejedzenie (Non-eating) (2010)
- Podryw po polsku (Pick up in Polish) (2010)
- Uwodziciele (Seducers) (2010)
- Good morning, Lenin! (2009)
- Wkręcacze (Blenders) (2006)
- Gruba do łóżka, chuda na bal… (Fat girl to bed, skinny girl on the ball...) (2006)
- Pogrzeby to nasze życie (Funeral is our life) (2004)
- Alwernia (2004)
- Oprowadzę was po moim świecie (I will show you my world)(2003)
- Zawód: posłanka (Occupation: Member of Parliament) (2002)
- Sztuka kochania według Wisłockiej (Art of love according to Wisłocka) (2000)
- Tajemnice starego domu (Secrets of an old house) (1999)
- Pani od seksu (The lady of sex) (1998)
- Sceny z życia kick-bokserki (Scenes from the kick-boxer's life) (1997)
- Dziennikarze '82 (Journalists '82) (1997)
- Nowa opowieść o prawdziwym człowieku (New story of a real man) (1996)
- Cały pogrzeb na nic! (The whole funeral for nothing!) (1995)
- Bondologia stosowana (Applied Bondology) (1995)
- Zdziczenie obyczajów pośmiertnych (Savagery of posthumous habits) (1995)
- Komiksiarze (Comic-bookers) (1994)
- Parafia księdza kustosza (Parish of the curator priest) (1993)
- O wawelskim smoku (About the Wawel Dragon) (1993)
- Pan inspektor przyszedł (Mr. Inspector came) (1987)
- Witamy w Anglii (Welcome to England) (1987)
