= The Science of Weird Shit =

2024 book written by Chris French

The Science of Weird Shit: Why Our Minds Conjure the Paranormal
- The cover of the book
- Author: Chris French
- Language: English
- Publisher: The MIT Press
- Publication date: 2024-03-19
- Media type: Print
- Pages: 416
- ISBN: 9780262048361

The Science of Weird Shit: Why Our Minds Conjure the Paranormal is a 2024 non-fiction book by British psychologist Chris French, published by MIT Press. The book explores the psychological and cognitive mechanisms behind paranormal beliefs and experiences, including ghost encounters, alien abductions, reincarnation, and near-death phenomena. French examines phenomena such as sleep paralysis, cognitive biases, and pareidolia to shed light on why people perceive supernatural events and what these perceptions reveal about human cognition. The book includes a foreword by Richard Wiseman.

== Reception ==
In a May 2024 review for New Scientist, Wendy Grossman commended Chris French's book for its nuanced exploration of paranormal phenomena through the lens of psychology. Grossman highlighted French's balanced approach in examining experiences like sleep paralysis and cognitive biases such as pareidolia, appreciating his mix of academic knowledge and practical application. She noted that French's goal isn't to dismiss people's beliefs but to contextualize them within psychological understanding.

Brian Reffin Smith, in his review for Leonardo Reviews, praised the book for its clear-headed and sympathetic exploration of why people believe in the paranormal. Smith highlighted how French demystifies phenomena ranging from alien abductions to near-death experiences by unraveling the psychological processes behind these beliefs, emphasizing humanity's capacity for self-deception and the importance of a principled search for truth.

The book also received attention in various media outlets. The Guardian featured Chris French discussing themes from his book, particularly why people who believe in ghosts may resist scientific explanations for their experiences. Skeptical Inquirer published an interview with French, where he elaborated on his journey from believer to skeptic and the importance of studying "weird stuff" to understand human cognition and promote scientific skepticism. Excerpts and discussions from the book were also featured in Big Think, Nautilus, and iNews, where Clare Wilson drew on insights from the book to explore psychological traits that predispose people to believe in the paranormal.

In a March 2024 review for the Society for Psychical Research, Nemo C. Mörck described the book as a valuable commentary from mainstream psychology on paranormal phenomena. Mörck noted that French covers topics such as sleep paralysis, alien abductions, mediumship, and near-death experiences while writing with laypersons in mind. While recommending the book as a good starting point, Mörck mentioned that readers interested in survival after death might be disappointed by its limited coverage on that topic.

In an April 2024 review on Higgypop Paranormal, Steve Higgins praised the book as one of the most comprehensive and rational explorations of paranormal phenomena. The review noted that while French is known for his skeptical stance, the book goes beyond debunking to explore why such phenomena fascinate people, offering insights into human psychology and culture.

Some reviewers found the book informative but occasionally too academic. The reviewer from Buttercup's Book Blog appreciated the scientific approach but found the audio format challenging due to numerous lists and facts, suggesting that a print version might be more suitable. She also expected more humor given the book's title and felt the delivery was somewhat dry. Similarly, Brian Clegg of the Popular Science Books Blog felt the book lacked the anticipated entertainment value due to limited storytelling but acknowledged French's effective introduction to anomalistic psychology and appreciated his objective approach.
