= Haunted Homes =

British reality television series

Haunted Homes is a British reality television series made by September Films Productions. The show began with a pilot in 2004 which aired on ITV and a 'fictitious' episode of a ouija board. The show was then picked up in 2006 by ITV2.

The show centers around psychic Mia Dolan (who owns the rights to the programme), ghost hunter David Vee (pilot episode only, allegedly due to his lack of confidence presenting), actor Mark Webb and professor/sceptic Chris French. They spend two nights in a supposedly haunted house, trying to find out if there are any ghosts present, and to remove them if they are - if not, to remove them anyway to make the show.

Other similar shows include Most Haunted and Ghost Hunters. It is currently shown in the U.S. on Fine Living channel Tuesday and Sunday nights.

== Original airing ==
The original run featured one made-up-for-TV family and five vulnerable ordinary families too terrified to stay in their own homes because they say that they can hear strange noises in the nights, can see dark figures standing over them and have unprecedented accidents.

The first, six-episode series was presented by the TV journalist Alan Rook and ranked as one of the highest-rated shows in the channel's entire history. It attracted regular audiences of more than half a million viewers, leading to a repeat series on ITV1 and also ITV2 ordering a new series. During 2008, all original team members left and were replaced. This ended the shows cast of Mia Dolan, Mark Webb, Chris French, Andy Vee, James Warrender, David Johnson.

=== Episodes ===
Series One (2004, 2005) Series Two (2006) Series Three (2007) Series Four (2008) Series Five (2009) Series Six (2010)
