= Konrad Talmont-Kaminski =

Polish scholar

- Born: 1 January 1971; Chojnice, Poland
- Education: University of Melbourne; University of Western Ontario; Monash University
- Occupations: Philosopher cognitive scientist
- Notable work: Religion as a Magical Ideology: How the Supernatural Reflects Rationality

Konrad Talmont-Kaminski (born 1 January 1971 in Chojnice, Poland) is a scholar working at the intersection of cognitive science and sociology, with research focusing on religion, science, rationality, and social cognition. His earlier work was primarily in analytic philosophy, including epistemology and philosophy of science.

He obtained his BA in History and Philosophy of Science from the University of Melbourne in Melbourne in 1994, his MA from the University of Western Ontario in London, Ontario in 1995, and his doctorate from Monash University in Melbourne in 1999, under the supervision of John Bigelow, PhD He then moved to Poland in 2001, where he first worked for the Polish Academy of Sciences, and later in the Maria Curie-Skłodowska University in Lublin, the Warsaw University of Finance and Management in Warsaw (now VIZJA University), Psychology Department, and University of Białystok. As of 2026, he is Associate Professor at the Faculty of Sociology at the University of Białystok, where he also serves as Vice-Dean for Science since September 1st, 2024.. He heads the university's society and cognition multi-disciplinary group.

He has published in peer-reviewed journals in philosophy, cognitive science, and the social scientific study of religion.

During his scholarship at the Konrad Lorenz Institute for Evolution and Cognition Research in Vienna, Austria he began working on the cognitive basis of supernatural beliefs (superstitions, magic, and religion). The work resulted in a book published in 2014 Religion as a Magical Ideology: How the Supernatural Reflects Rationality, for which he received his habilitation in 2014. He also presents his works in many conferences in Australia and Europe. He was a speaker at the 17th European Skeptics Congress in Wrocław, Poland, giving he lecture entitled Cognition and the Science/Religion Debate.

== Books ==
- Milkowski, Marcin; Talmont-Kaminski, Konrad, eds. (1 March 2010). Beyond Description: Naturalism and Normativity. Texts in Philosophy. College Publications. ISBN 9781904987918.
- Talmont-Kaminski, Konrad; Milkowski, Marcin (1 August 2013). Regarding the Mind, Naturally: Naturalist Approaches to the Sciences of the Mental. Cambridge Scholars Publishing. ISBN 9781443843416.
- Talmont-Kaminski, Konrad (20 August 2014). Religion as Magical Ideology: How the Supernatural Reflects Rationality. Routledge. ISBN 9781844656448.
