= Holm Gero Hümmler =

German nuclear physicist and skeptic (born 1970)

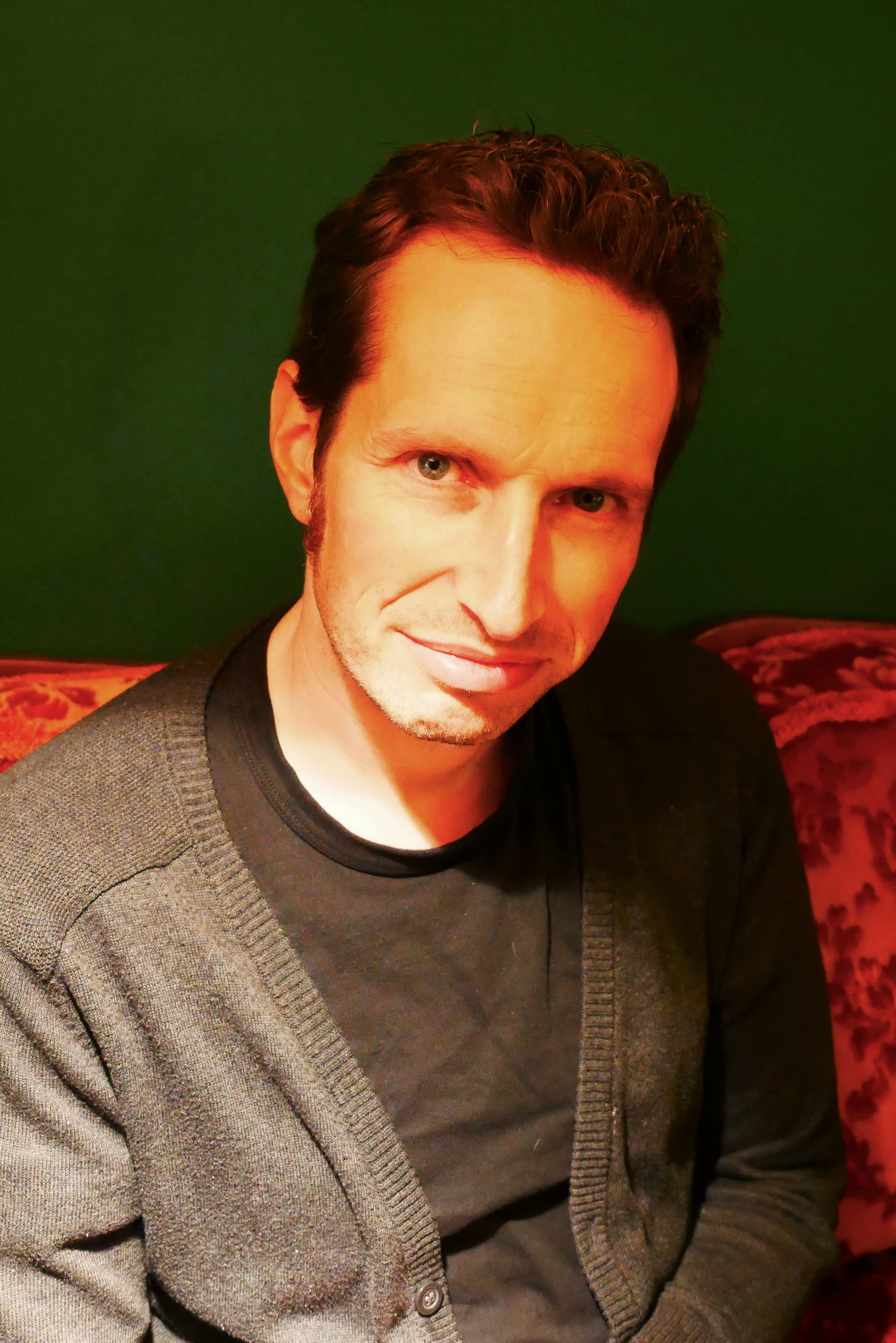
- Holm Gero Hümmler, 2017
- Born: September 22, 1970; Hanau, (Germany)
- Education: Goethe University Frankfurt, Technical University of Munich, University of Hagen
- Occupations: Physicist, consultant
- Website: https://quantenquark.com/holm-huemmler/

Holm Gero Hümmler (born September 22, 1970) is a German nuclear physicist and skeptic, living in Bad Homburg, near Frankfurt am Main.

== Biography ==
Hümmler was born in Hanau. He studied physics and meteorology at Goethe University Frankfurt, together with economy at University of Hagen. He was active in politics while at university. While working on his diploma thesis he spent several months at CERN in Geneva, Switzerland. He completed his PhD at Technical University of Munich in 2000. He also worked at Max Planck Society, physics department. Hümmler describes his field of physics as being between nuclear physics and particle physics.

He participated in the STAR experiment at the Relativistic Heavy Ion Collider in Brookhaven National Laboratory, Upton, New York. He left science in 2001 and first worked for Boston Consulting Group. In 2007 he founded Uncertainty Managers Consulting. The company specializes in numerical models for business planning, mainly for the Pharmaceutical and Healthcare sector.

He lives and works in Bad Homburg, near Frankfurt am Main.

== Skepticism ==
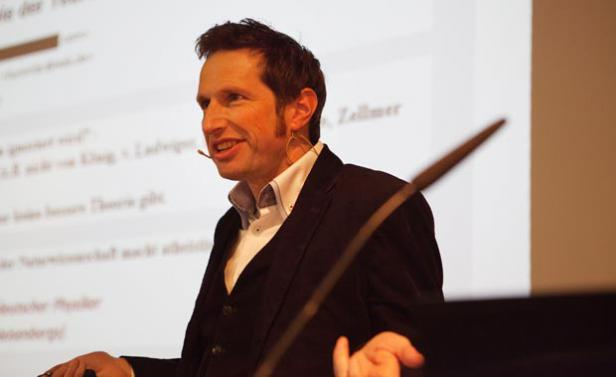
Holm Gero Hümmler at SkepKon 2017 conference in Berlin

Hümmler has been active in the German skeptics' group GWUP since 1990s. He was a regional spokesman and convenor for the Frankfurt area. He first became interested in skepticism after reading about the European Skeptics Congress. For several years he was an editor of The Skeptiker magazine. He now investigates pseudoscience claims mostly from the areas of pseudo-physics, business esoterics, conspiracy theories, supernatural claims in martial arts, alleged UFO encounters, weather effects, biological influence of radiation, misuse of physics terminology in pseudoscience, especially in Quantum Theory and Theory of Relativity, debunking free energy theories and quantum healing.

Hümmler appears in media as a GWUP expert commenting on conspiracy theories, such as chemtrails. In 2008 he investigated the abilities of Shaolin monks on the Galileo Mystery TV show.

In a German Physik Journal, an official journal of the Deutsche Physikalische Gesellschaft, which is the world's largest organization of physicists, Hümmler wrote an article calling physicists to take a stand against the esoteric abuse of science.

His first book, Relativer Quantenquark, was published in April 2017. It deals with pseudo-physical claims in esoterics and alternative medicine, but it also explains the basics of quantum mechanics and relativity. As of July 2017, Hümmler is working on a new book.

Hümmler is an author of the science blog quantenquark.com. He was a speaker at the 17th European Skeptics Congress in Wrocław, Poland, where he presented a speech titled Relative Quantum Nonsense: Don't be Fooled by False Physics.

== Publications ==
- Tachyonen: Schnelles Geld mit schnellen Teilchen – oder ohne? Ein missbrauchter Begriff der Physik (Tachions: Quick money from quick particles – or not? A misused physical concept.) Skeptiker 4/2002, p. 154, doc file
- Tachyonen, Felder, Freie Energie – wie die Esoterik die Begriffe der Physik missbraucht (Tachions, fields, free energy – misused physical concepts) (lecture PDF notes)
- Chemtrails – Zwischen Meteorologie und Verschwörungstheorie (Chemtrails between meteorology and conspiracy theory) Skeptiker 2/2006, pp. 48–55, PDF file
- Das Geheimnis des Kung Fu (The secret of Kung-fu) Skeptiker 3/2006, pp. 112–120
- Erdbebenmaschinen Das HAARP – Experiment und die Verschwörungstheoretiker (HAARP experiment and conspiracy theorists) Skeptiker 3/2011, pages 108 – 116

== Books ==
- Relativer Quantenquark. Kann die moderne Physik die Esoterik belegen? (Springer-Verlag Berlin Heidelberg, 2017) ISBN 978-3662538289
- Verschwörungsmythen. Wie wir mit verdrehten Fakten für dumm verkauft werden. (Hirzel, 2019) ISBN 978-3777627809
- with Ulrike Schiesser: Fakt und Vorurteil. Kommunikation mit Esoterikern, Fanatikern und Verschwörungsgläubigen. Springer Berlin 2021, ISBN 978-3662632086
