= Klub Sceptyków Polskich =

Polish critical thinking organization

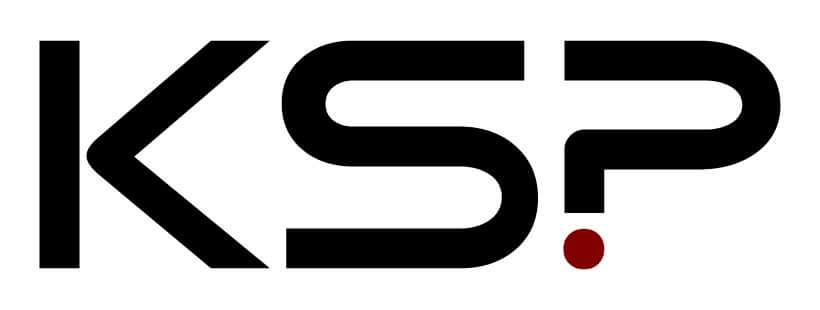
- Abbreviation: KSP
- Formation: 2010
- Type: Nonprofit organisation
- Purpose: Promotion of critical thinking and scientific skepticism
- Region served: Poland
- Board of directors: Tomasz Witkowski, Andrzej Gregosiewicz, Wojciech Pisula, Maciej Zatoński, Adam Wierzbicki
- Main organ: Scientific Council
- Website: sceptycy.pl (archived) Pronunciation of 'Klub Sceptyków Polskich'

Klub Sceptyków Polskich or KSP (English: Polish Skeptics Club or Polish Sceptics Club) is a non-profit, non-governmental organisation actively engaged in the promotion of critical thinking, scientific skepticism and scientific methods. It unites scientists and people interested in science and scientific research in Poland.

== Aims ==
The main aim of the KSP is to propagate and popularise evidence-based, empirical scientific knowledge and its practical implications. Additionally, the KSP is engaged in protecting the general public against pseudoscientific activities that could pose harm (especially in areas such as medicine or clinical / forensic psychology). The Polish Skeptics Club operates mainly by organising educational events, lectures, conferences and by actively participating in meetings and conferences related to the promotion of empirical knowledge and/or unmasking pseudoscience. Members of the KSP conduct scientific research and are focused on verifying claims, when there is a possibility that they are misleading or false. Members also write and publish (in classic and digital media) articles and information related to promotion and propagation of good research practices, good medical and therapeutic practice (especially in medicine and psychology), unmasking fraudulent or unverified claims, etc. In addition to all of the above, members of the KSP prepare petitions and public inquiries to relevant public authorities in cases where public safety might be compromised (e.g. medical / psychological therapies). The KSP cooperates with local and national media in order to popularise critical thinking, empirical knowledge and unmasking pseudoscience. The KSP organises lectures, meetings, conferences and other events promoting health awareness and health knowledge. The Polish Skeptics Club supports researchers and practitioners, especially if their actions targeted at pseudoscience lead to ostracism from their community and to worsening of their social status. The KSP also cooperates with individuals and institutions with similar stated aims.

== Activities ==
=== Watch-dog activities ===
The KSP realises its stated goals by unmasking pseudoscience in public domains. Members of the KSP were conducting numerous similar activities before the club was formally established. In the Spring of 2009, Tomasz Witkowski together with Łukasz Turski and Tomasz Sowiński from the Institute of Theoretical Physics of the Polish Academy of Sciences had written an open letter “In Defence of Reason”. The letter was addressed to the former Minister of Work and Social Policy - Jolanta Fedak. The authors protested against officially recognising such professions as fortune tellers, astrologers, bioenergotherapists, clairvoyants, etc. The letter was signed by 4,982 people, including Polish scientists from around the world. This event was covered by national media. The Ministry ignored the signatories of the letter, but the action greatly increased public awareness of pseudoscience penetrating all aspects of social, legal and educational activities. The course of events was also covered by the Skeptical Inquirer.

In May 2010, the Institute of Psychology at Opole University hosted a lecture for faith healer George E. Ashkar, who allegedly can “cure” 100% of all cases of cancer, AIDS, rheumatoid arthritis, bronchial asthma and other conditions. Maciej Zatoński and Tomasz Witkowski protested against spreading pseudoscience within the walls of a higher academic institution. They published an Open Letter Against Popularisation of Pseudoscience to the Rector of the University. The letter was signed by over 200 signatories and was covered by media. In the Spring of 2013, students of Opole University invited a clairvoyant, Krzysztof Jackowski to lecture. The KSP protested against such practices, but the Rector decided to host the lecture.

=== 10:23 Campaign ===
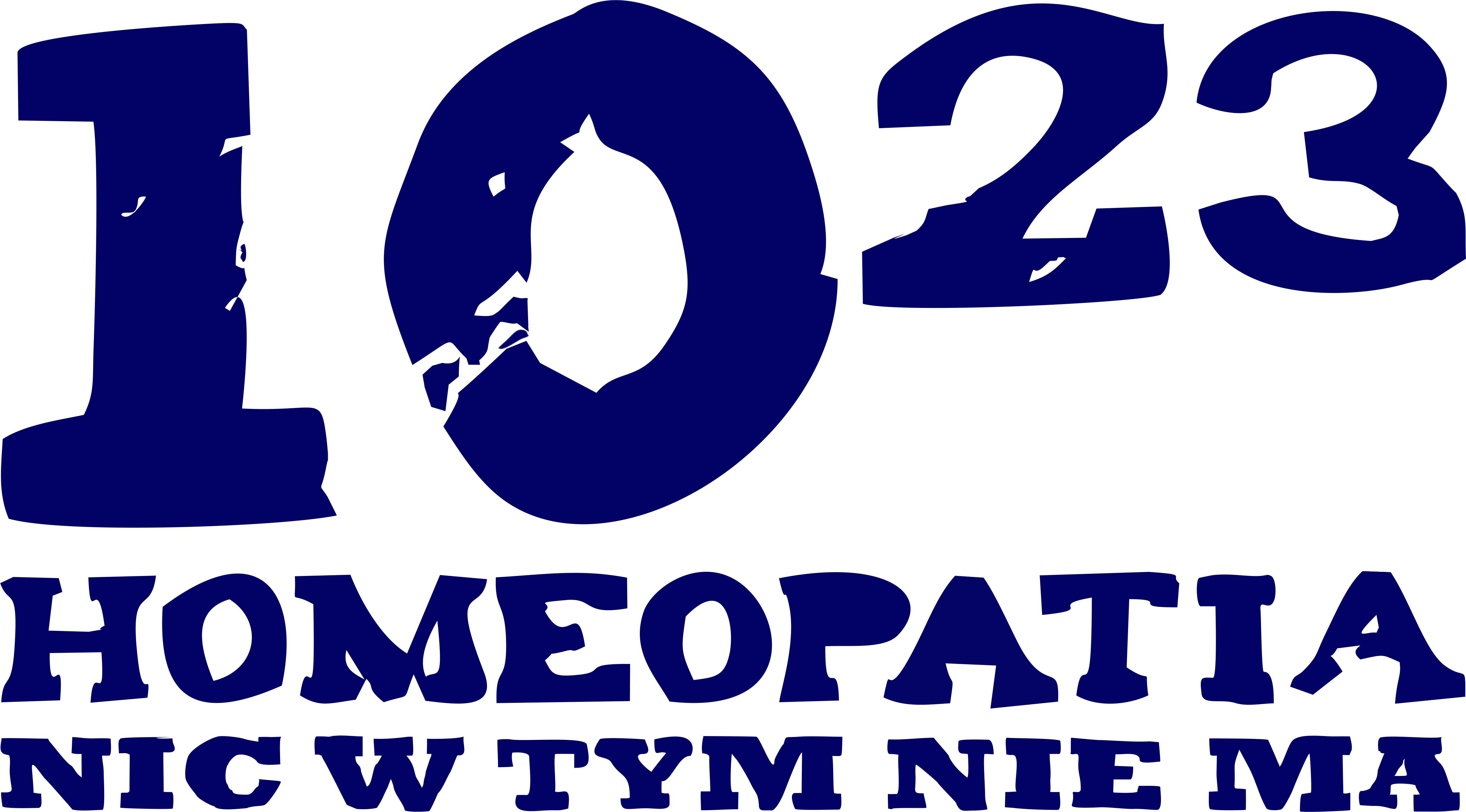
Polish 10:23 Campaign logo.

The KSP is well known for its very critical approach to homeopathy. KSP members have published many critical articles on homeopathy and pseudoscience in medical practice. In 2011, the KSP joined the global 10:23 Campaign, where members of skeptical organisations around the globe "overdosed" on homeopathic “pills”. The campaign's goal was to focus public attention on the lack of any value of homeopathic “remedies” in treatment or prophylaxis of any medical conditions.

=== Sisyphus Prize ===
The Sisyphus Prize of 25,000 Euro has been offered by the Belgian skeptical organisation Studiekring voor de Kritische Evaluatie van Pseudowetenschap en het Paranormale (SKEPP) to anyone who can demonstrate, under scientifically controlled conditions, the ability to accomplish feats that are paranormal or impossible according to present scientific knowledge. For one year (1 October 2012 – 30 September 2013), an anonymous businessman from Antwerp increased the value of the prize to 1,000,000 Euro. The Polish Skeptics Club was invited to conduct the entry qualification tests in Poland. As of June 2015, not a single candidate managed to demonstrate his/her paranormal skills, despite the fact that a few of them publicly declared that they would undertake the challenge.

=== Psychology is science, not witchcraft Campaign ===
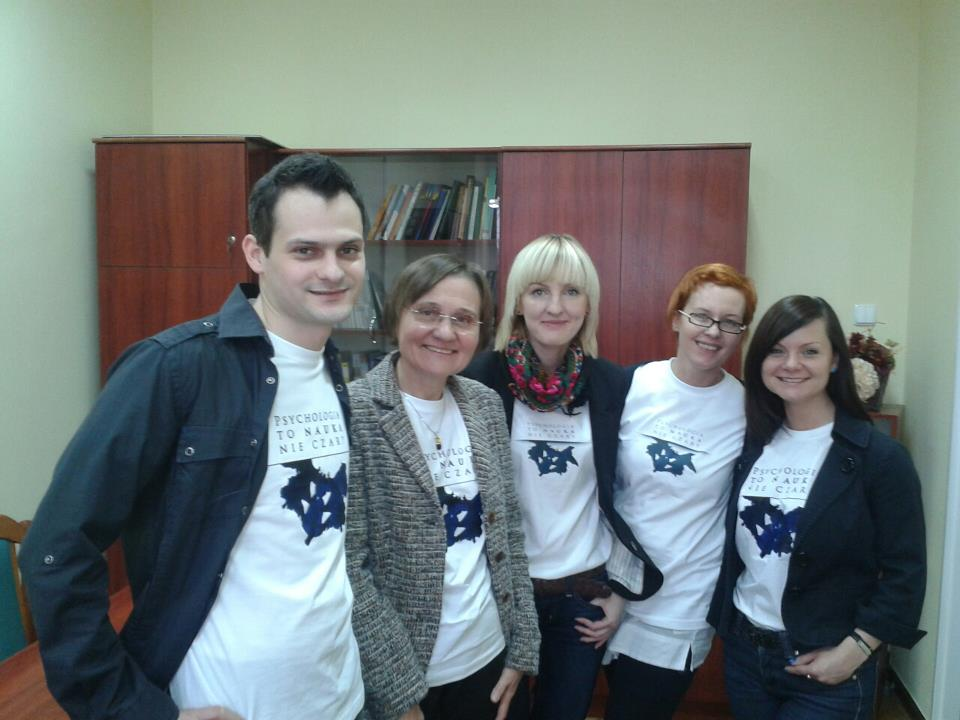
Campaigners at the University of Łódź.

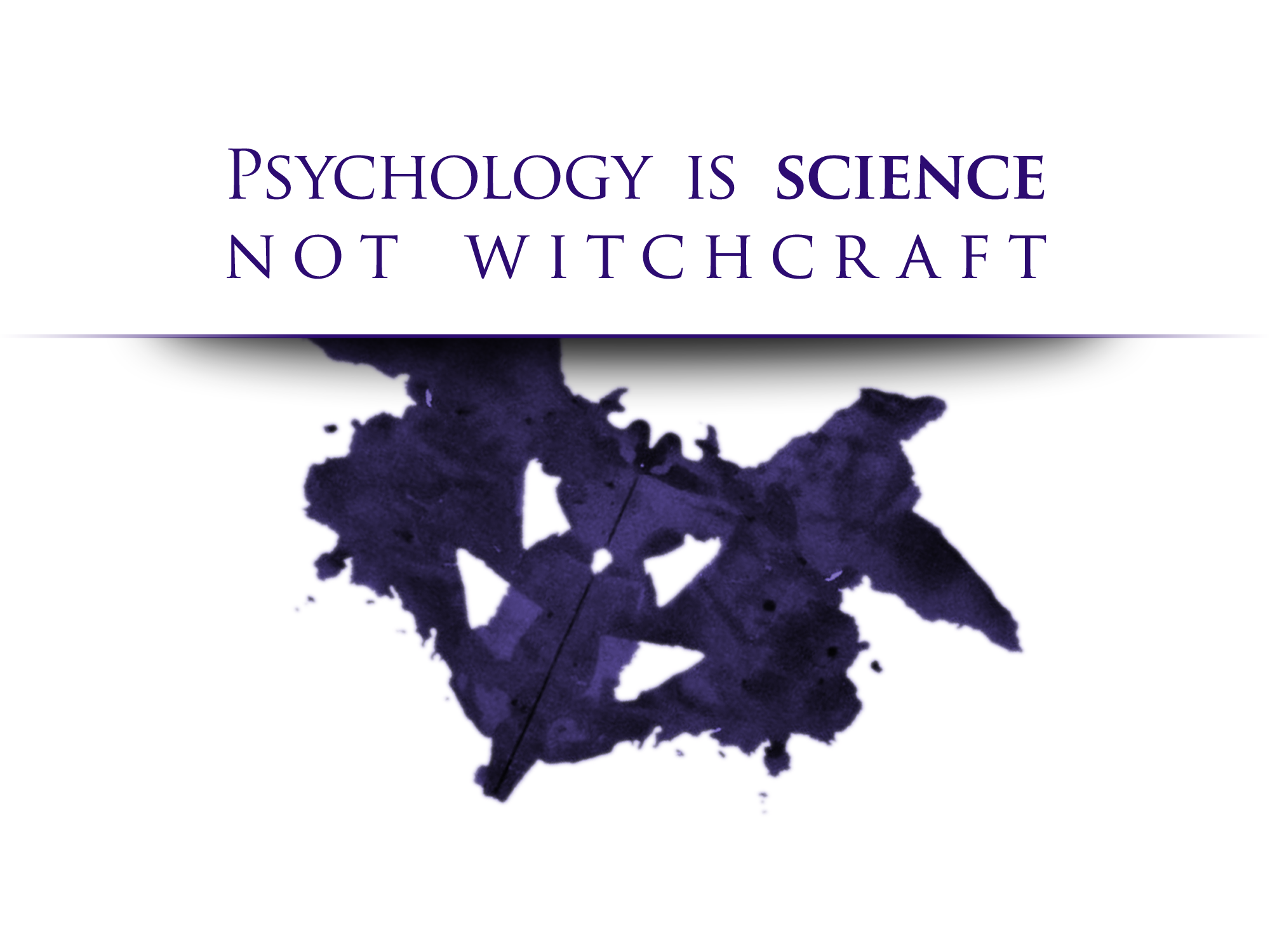
Logo of the "Psychology is science, not witchcraft" Campaign.

On 27 February 2012 over 140 Polish scientists, practicing psychologists and university students joined a KSP-led four-day protest against using invalidated and potentially harmful tests by clinical and forensic psychologists. The campaign was focused primarily on the Rorschach test (and other projective tests). On this day, protesters showed up wearing t-shirts with the campaign's name in the largest universities in Poland (University of Social Sciences and Humanities, University of Łódź, University of Warsaw and University of Wrocław), in numerous offices of psychotherapists and in many bookstores. The culmination point of the campaign was on 1 March, when students were collecting signatures under an open letter to Polish Association of Psychologists, asking to stop distributing useless diagnostic tools and tests. The protest was widely covered by national media and was applauded by scientific communities. They considered the fact that methods such as the Rorschach test are used in Polish courts to very dangerous, because they could lead to false accusations and false exonerations. Dariusz Doliński commented: "I know that conclusions about human personality, based on what is seen in the ink blots, can make a huge impression on lay people. But people who are educated in psychology, should be aware that virtually no one knows what the test measures – if it measures anything more than the originality of associations."

=== International activity ===
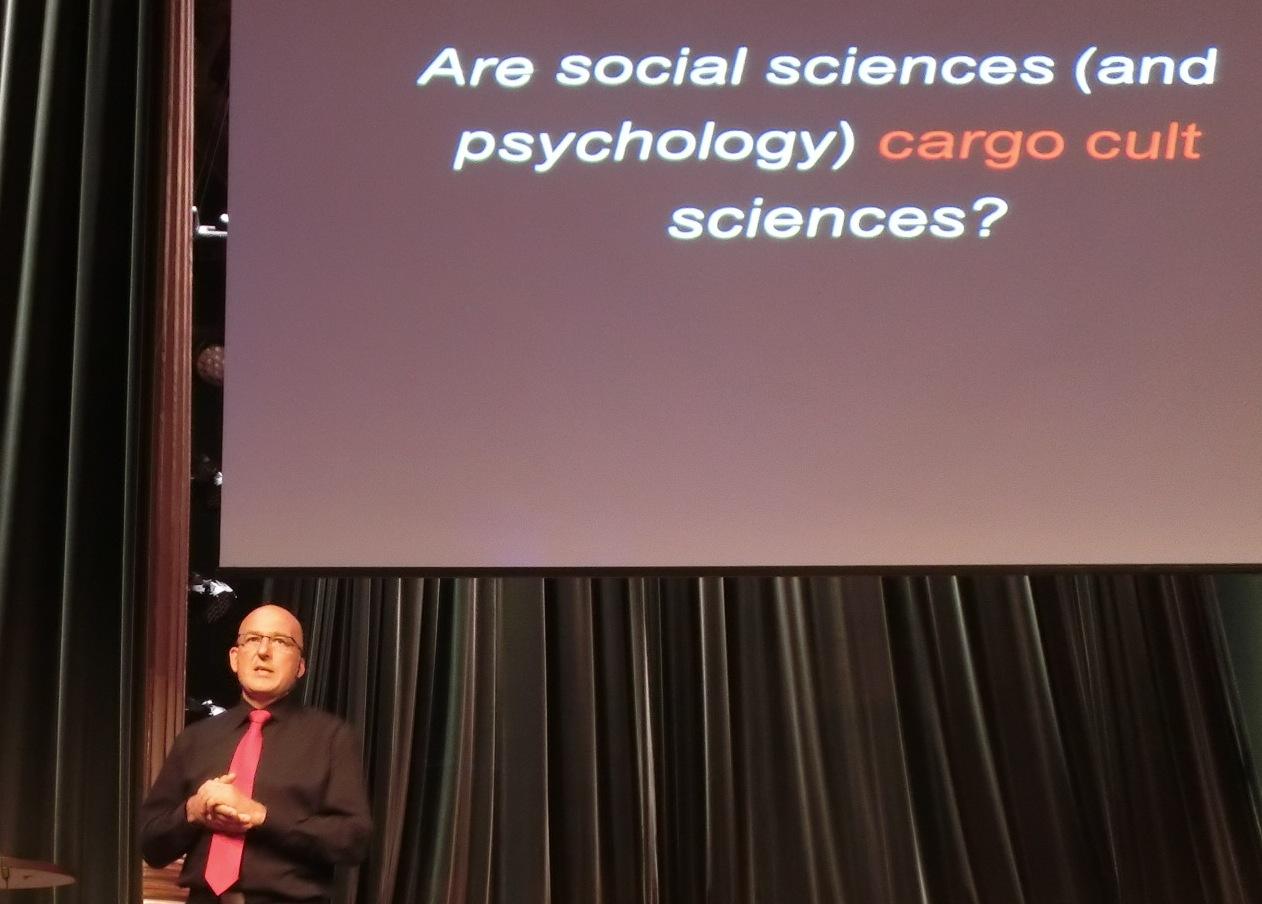
Tomasz Witkowski lecturing at the 15th European Skeptics Congress 2013.

Since 2010, members of the KSP actively participate in international skeptical congresses, publish in international popular science, and peer-reviewed scientific journals, and comment for international media. In 2013, Polish Skeptics Club was actively engaged in the AllTrials campaign, including petitioning to Polish representatives to European Parliament to support the disclosure of data from clinical trials.

=== Recurrent lectures, meetings and workshops ===
The KSP systematically hosts and organises lectures and discussions popularising various aspects of science and unmasking pseudoscience. They were regularly hosted in the “Falanster” book club and café in Wrocław and in the “Psyche” bookstore in Warsaw. Since the closure of “Falanster” they are only organised in Warsaw. On 12 September 2013, in cooperation with the Polish Association of Rationalists (Polskie Stowarzyszenie Racjonalistów), the KSP hosted a lecture for Jerry Coyne from the Department of Ecology and Evolution of Chicago University, entitled “Why religion and science …”. Chris French, the Head of Anomalistic Psychology Research Unit from Goldsmiths College in London, was a guest speaker during another event hosted by the KSP ("Weird science: Introduction to Anomalistic Psychology") on 24 June 2014.

In 2017, Klub Sceptyków Polskich along with Český klub skeptiků Sisyfos (Czech Skeptic's Club), organised the seventeenth European Skeptics Congress (ESC).This event was held in Old Town Wrocław, Poland. The ESC has been held every two years since 1989, each time hosted by a different member of the European Council of Skeptical Organisations (ECSO). Events included skeptical workshops for the general public, as well as lectures on topics such as science and religion, genetically modified organisms, exorcisms and skeptical psychology. Speakers and panellists included Leo Igwe, Gábor Hraskó, Chris French and Amardeo Sarma.

== Media presence ==
Actions of the KSP are regularly reported by local and national media, and KSP members are often invited as experts. For example, Tomasz Garstka has been invited numerous times to national programmes to comment on clairvoyance or hypnosis as a form of therapy. Witkowski often appears as an expert in discussions on pseudoscience in psychology, psychotherapy and education. The medical expert on alternative medicine is Andrzej Gregosiewicz.
