= Péter Krekó =

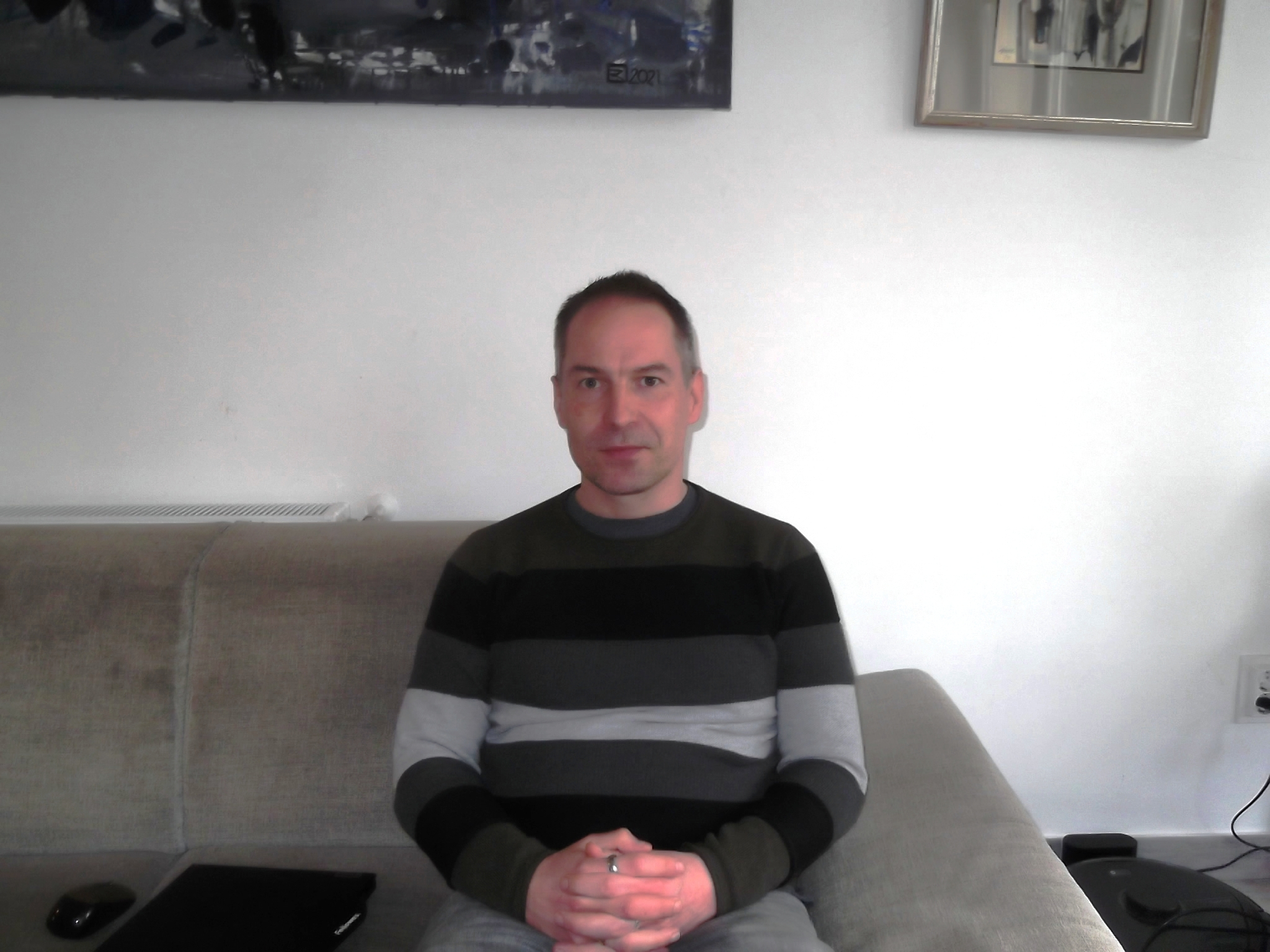
- Born: 20 March 1980 (age 46); Budapest, Hungary
- Citizenship: Hungarian

Academic work
- Discipline: Political science

Péter Krekó (born 20 March 1980) is a Hungarian economist, political psychologist, political scientist, and professor. He currently serves as the director of the Political Capital Institute, and as a senior external researcher for the Center for European Policy Analysis.

== Early life and career ==
Krekó was born on 20 March 1980 to Béla Krekó Jr. and Ildikó Kupa. His grandfather Béla Krekó was a mathematical economist. Currently, Péter Krekó is the supervisor of the Doctoral School of Psychology at Eötvös Loránd University. His areas of research include: conspiracy theories, fake news, political populism and extremism, Russian soft power influence, and intergroup conflicts.

== Notable works ==
- Web of Science has published 10 studies. h-index 4. Average citations per item 7. Number of independent citations 68.
- Péter Krekó. 32 Publications, 12,289 Reads, 245 Citations.
- Faragó Laura-Ferenczy-Nyúl Dávid- Kende-Anna-Krekó Péter-Gurály, Zoltán: Criminalization as a justification for violence against the homeless in Hungary. JOURNAL OF SOCIAL PSYCHOLOGY 161 Paper: OnlineFirst. 15 p. (2021)
- Kende-Anna-Krekó Péter: Xenophobia, prejudice, and right-wing populism in East-Central Europe. CURRENT OPINION IN BEHAVIORAL SCIENCES 34 pp. 29–33. 5 p. (2020)
- Countering conspiracy theories and misinformation. In: Butter, M; Knight, P (szerk.) Routledge Handbook of Conspiracy Theories. Abingdon, Egyesült Királyság / Anglia : Routledge, (2020) p.
- Faragó-Laura-Kende, Anna-Krekó, Péter: We only Believe in News that We Doctored Ourselves: The Connection between Partisanship and Political Fake News. SOCIAL PSYCHOLOGY 51. 2 pp. 77–90. 14 p. (2020)
- Russia in Hungarian public opinion. In: Tóth István György (szerk.) Hungarian Social Report 2019.Budapest, Magyarország. Tárki Társadalomkutatási Intézet Zrt., (2019) pp. 358–371. 16 p.
- Krekó Péter-Molnár Csaba-Rácz András: Mystification and demystification of Putin's Russia: Research summary: 26 p. (2019) Budapest. Political Capital Policy Research and Consulting Institute Kiadó.
- Faragó Laura-Kende, Anna-Krekó Péter: Justification of intergroup violence – the role of right-wing authoritarianism and propensity for radical action. DYNAMICS OF ASYMMETRIC CONFLICT: PATHWAYS TOWARD TERRORISM AND GENOCIDE 12. 2 pp. 113–128. 16 p. (2019)
- The relationship between populist attitudes and support for political violence in Hungary and Poland. Paper. (2018)
- Mass Paranoia: The Social Psychology of Conspiracy Theories and False News. (in Hungarian); Budapest, Magyarország, Athenaeum Kiadó (2018), 350 p.
- Péter Krekó-Attila, Juhász: The Hungarian Far Right: Social Demand, Political Supply, and International Context. Stuttgart, Németország. Ibidem-Verlag (2017) 260 p.
- Conspiracy Theory as Collective Motivated Cognition. In: Bilewicz, M; Cichocka, A; Soral, W (szerk.) The Psychology of Conspiracy. London, Egyesült Királyság. Routledge. (2015) pp. 62–75., 8 p.
