= Ovidiu Covaciu =

Romanian professional footballer

Personal information
- Date of birth: 3 September 1990 (age 36)
- Place of birth: Mediaș, Romania
- Height: 1.82 m (6 ft 0 in)
- Position: Midfielder

Team information
- Current team: Sâncrai Nazna
- Number: 31

Youth career
- 2000–2011: Gaz Metan Mediaș

Senior career*
Years	Team	Apps	(Gls)
2011–2015	Gaz Metan Mediaș	4	(0)
2012–2013	→ Arieșul Turda (loan)		
2016	Avântul Reghin		
2016	Metalurgistul Cugir	12	(3)
2017	Unirea Jucu	13	(1)
2017–2018	Dacia Unirea Brăila	21	(0)
2018	Hărman	14	(2)
2019–2021	Avântul Reghin	38	(8)
2021	Odorheiu Secuiesc	10	(1)
2022–2023	Gloria Bistrița	22	(0)
2023–	Sâncrai Nazna	3	(4)

International career^{‡}
2010	Romania U-19	2	(0)
- * Club domestic league appearances and goals as of 12:56, 13 January 2024 (UTC) ‡ National team caps and goals as of 12 March 2018

Ovidiu Covaciu (born 3 September 1990) is a Romanian professional footballer who plays as a midfielder for Sâncrai Nazna. Covaciu debuted in Liga I for Gaz Metan Mediaș and played in Liga II for Dacia Unirea Brăila and in Liga III for teams such as: Arieșul Turda, Avântul Reghin, Metalurgistul Cugir or Unirea Jucu.
