= Universal Medicine =

Australian alternative medicine cult

Alternative medicine
- Claims: Esoteric healing; esoteric breast massage, chakra-puncture, ovarian readings, esoteric ovary massage, esoteric connective tissue therapy.
- Related fields: Esotericism, Occult, New Religious Movements, Pseudoscience, Theosophy.
- Original proponents: Serge Benhayon
- Subsequent proponents: Natalie, Simone, Michael and Deborah Benhayon.

Universal Medicine, abbreviated as UniMed or UM, is an organisation, often described as a cult, founded and led by Serge Benhayon, a former bankrupt tennis coach from New South Wales (NSW) Australia who has no medical qualifications. It sells "esoteric healing" products, music, publications, workshops and courses. None of the healing modalities are evidence based or have been proven effective by scientific research. Uruguayan-born Benhayon founded the group in 1999 after receiving what he described as an "energetic impress" while on the toilet. A NSW Supreme Court jury found it was true to say that he leads a "socially dangerous" and "socially harmful cult", "intentionally indecently touched" clients and "is a charlatan who makes fraudulent medical claims". In a British court ruling, UM was found to be "a cult with some potentially harmful and sinister elements".

The organisation and unregulated health service provider is principally located in Goonellabah and Wollongbar, near Lismore, NSW, Australia. Its European headquarters are known as "The Lighthouse" and is situated in the village of Tytherington near Frome, Somerset, England.

The signature treatments practised and taught by Universal Medicine are "esoteric breast massage", "esoteric healing", "ovarian readings", "chakra-puncture", "esoteric connective tissue therapy" and "esoteric ovary massage". All treatments were devised by non-registered health practitioner Serge Benhayon, who has claimed the business grosses at least AUD$2 million a year from courses and retreats.

The followers of its doctrine "The Way of the Livingness" are known collectively as "The Student Body". "The Teachings" are classified into meditation, self-care, nutrition, exercise, music, reincarnation, psychological wellbeing and the esoteric, and are supported by audio, books, and online lectures. Serge Benhayon describes himself as a "seer", calls himself the "Ascended Master", and followers call him the "new Messiah". They also believe he "was the one sent from (the mythical kingdom of) Shambhala to awaken us all", is the only human to have achieved the "highest level of initiation" on earth and claim the NSW Supreme Court ruling against him is "totally untrue". In the British court ruling, the doctrine was said to be one of "erroneous and malign beliefs".

While Benhayon has denied engaging in unethical practices, significant evidence to the contrary has been documented.

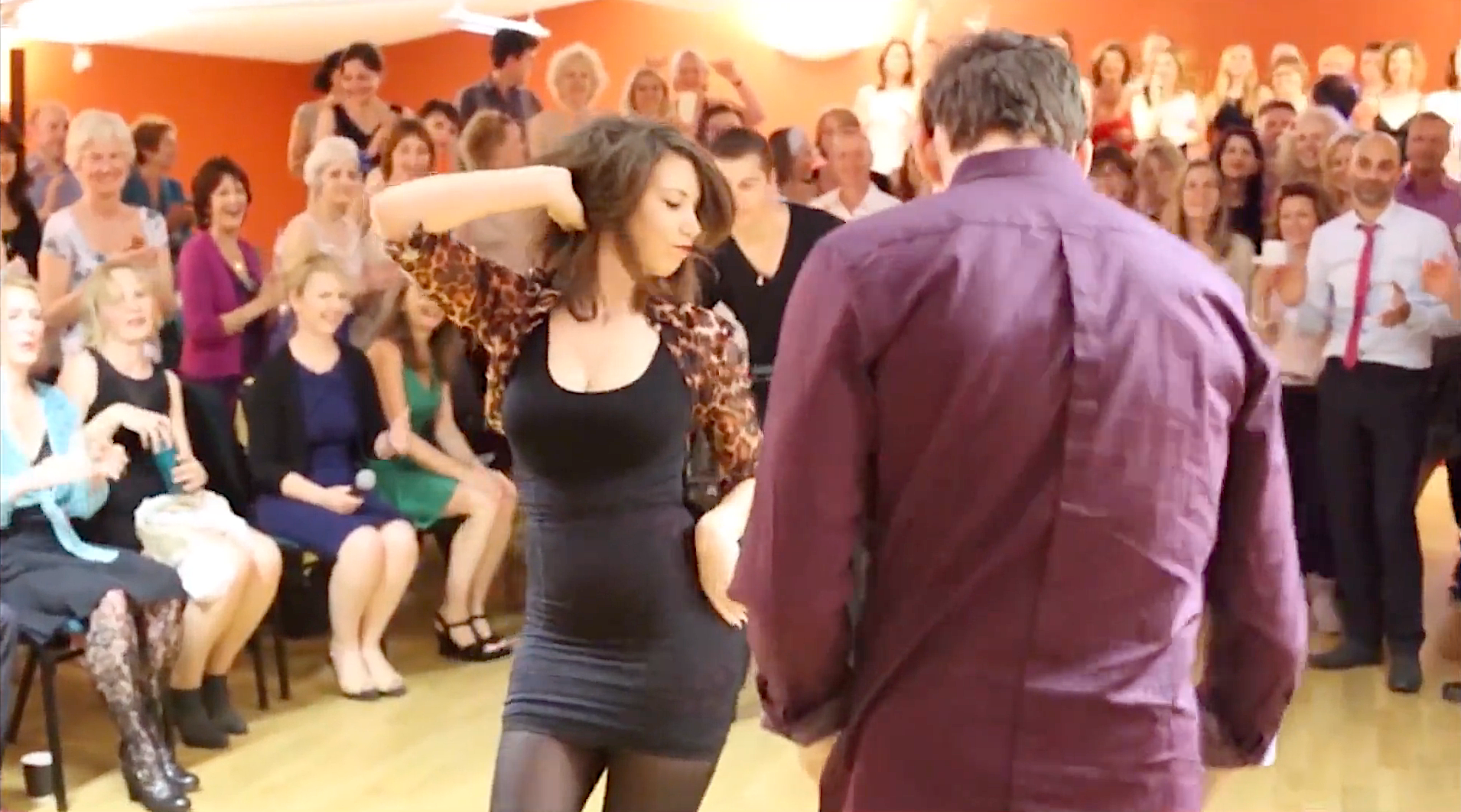
Natalie & Serge Benhayon at UM event 2015

== Beliefs and teachings ==
Benhayon's esoteric healing belief system is based on the occult teachings of early 20th century theosophist Alice A. Bailey. Serge Benhayon has claimed to be the reincarnation of Leonardo da Vinci and Pythagoras as well as Alice A. Bailey, Imhotep and Saint Peter. He has written that Leonardo da Vinci is a "Claimed Son of God" and teaches that he is connected energetically to an ancient lineage of "living wisdom", and more "High Initiates" and Claimed Sons of God will reincarnate "over and over again until each and every single human is united as one, by their true light". Benhayon also claims that his daughter, Simone, a swimming teacher and head of Universal Medicine UK, is the reincarnation of Winston Churchill.

Serge Benhayon devised Universal Medicine's healing practices based on the belief that disease is caused by energetic disharmony resulting from ill choices made in this and previous lifetimes. Benhayon teaches that there are two types of energy: prana (प्राण, prāṇa; Sanskrit for life force) and fire. Most forms of established wisdom, knowledge and belief, as well as most music and certain foods are believed to contain prana, which he regards as evil. Prana is to be rejected or cleared to be replaced with "fiery energy" which emanates from the "Atmic womb of God". Universal Medicine healing modalities and products, including teas, herbal elixirs, creams and laminated healing symbol postcards, aim to clear prana.

"I know more than any scientist in my inner heart ... I know everything about the universe and how it works. I can answer any question about any mystery in the world, any mystery in the universe."

— Serge Benhayon's message for the "New Era", January 1, 2012

Benhayon teaches that people who abuse their authority, such as dictators and corrupt politicians, are reincarnated as children with disabilities "as are Down syndrome, as are spastic,(sic) or any other disabled child" and claims disabilities such as Autism and Down syndrome are karma for past life sins. He has also controversially stated on many occasions that sexual abuse, including that towards children, is karma from past lives and the universe attempting to stop a person from continuing to make non-loving choices.

He also teaches that illness is caused by the possession of the body by evil spirits, and is reported to have told a terminally ill patient that an evil spirit had entered her liver and kidneys. He reportedly teaches couples that when a man orgasms inside a woman she will take on his bad energy and he has said that if a possessed entity is of a sexual nature then they can invade a father's body and while he sleeps at night leave his body and rape his daughters.

On race he writes that skin colour evolution was a conscious choice and that Asians chose yellow skin, saying: "yellow signifies the intellect" and the "pursuit of a lighter complexion arose when Black (sic) became erroneously identified with the Darkness (sic)". He taught his followers that if their children misspent their inheritance, or if they set conditions on their donations to UM, their "kidney energy" could be harmed in the next life.

During a sermon in September 2017, Benhayon stated he could "orgasm as a hermaphrodite (sic)", claiming he had the ability to "orgasm like a woman" and ejaculate as a man simultaneously.

Universal Medicine and The Way of the Livingness has followers in Australia, the UK, North America and Europe. Critics have characterised it as a cult, which has left a "trail of broken families". An ex-partner of a Universal Medicine supporter complained that Benhayon "controlled every aspect of our lives". Benhayon, who is reportedly referred to as a "fifth degree initiate" and "The One", rejects these claims. According to the Chilling Effects website and other sources he has used legal threats to have cult allegations, including those within media reports, removed from Australian Google Search indexes. The organisation has at least seven lawyers as members and officially denies it is a cult. But when Australian Doctor questioned Amelia Stephens, a UM member and a Brisbane doctor, she responded "This depends on what your definition of a cult is".

Benhayon and other senior UM members have a history of calling the police on journalists, and claim to be victims of a media witch hunt and smear campaign. The group's devotees and practitioners reportedly inundate media organisations who publish stories about UM with angry letters and written complaints and denounce those in the media who critique them as "irresponsible journalists". UK based director Simone Benhayon coordinates and instructs followers to post favourable comments online at least five or more times a day, with exceptions for those European members who recently had a "time travel experience".

Devotees created the company 'Real Media Real Change' to combat unfavourable media coverage as well as the Universal Medicine 'Facts' website by the UM 'Facts Team' to combat UM critics. Serge Benhayon is the registrant of this 'Facts about Universal Medicine' website. UM labels non-believers as "detractors" with senior UM members claiming that these detractors are really afraid of them. In 2019 the Supreme Court published that "evidence (was) tendered in the proceedings that there had been significant and persistent opposition to attempts to expose (UM's) bogus healing claims and practices, often involving personal and professional attacks on any critics... There are problems associated with (Benhayon's) ongoing zealous support, including from health professionals who evidence a lack of insight into the dangers of Universal Medicine activities, the deceptive conduct engaged in by (Benhayon) and Universal Medicine, and the risk that (Benhayon) poses to vulnerable people."

Followers claim to be members of UM, which they assert is "like a religion" but Benhayon contradicted this saying he ran a business with clients and that there is "no group and no members". Benhayon's doctrine "The Way of the Livingness" is one which he currently operates under his Universal Medicine business and is a 'form of theosophy'. It was denied charitable status in the UK in 2011 as it did not meet the criteria of a genuine religion and is not registered as a religion in Australia. Helena Blavatsky - the founder of the 19th century theosophy that Benhayon's doctrine is based on - insists that is not a religion.

Critics say Universal Medicine places unreasonable pressure on followers to adhere to a severely restricted diet and to avoid most exercise for fear those things might "infect their spiritual alignment" and lead to poor health. After reviewing a diet chart from Universal Medicine, the Professor of Public Health at the University of Wollongong and former president of the Public Health Association of Australia Heather Yeatman said it was "a public health issue" when children were placed on such restrictive diets: "If a child is not having dairy or cereals they are likely to be low in energy intake and there could be the risk of stunting if children are not getting enough energy. It is critically important there is a balanced diet, especially at the weaning stage because it can impact overall growth and cognitive development. It's a public health issue." This came after the report of a baby of UM member parents was hospitalised due to diet-related illness.

Followers are reportedly told health problems result from wrongdoings in their past lives. Cult Counselling Australia director Raphael Aron said his organisation had a researcher working full time on Universal Medicine after counselling former clients who were concerned about its influence on their children. Aron said CCA had also counselled breakaway followers, who were still "battling" to withdraw emotionally from the group. He also says:

UM seems to be "exercising a level of mind control to the point where people submit to whatever this fellow seems to be offering, to their detriment... What he's doing is potentially very dangerous".

Benhayon denies he or the group interfere in "the students" personal lives but detractors say relationships become impossible when everything from music to sex must be "Serge-approved". Cult expert David Millikan was quoted as saying "[Mr Benhayon] knows what they should read, what they should wear, what they should eat, how they should exercise, what sort of sexual life they should have and so they end up in this closed world". The NSW Supreme Court found the statements that Benhayon "is sexually manipulative of his cult followers" and "engages in bizarre sexual manipulation to make money for his business" to be true imputations.

=== Music ===
Benhayon asserts that music such as rock, reggae, pop, funk, rap and the work of J.S. Bach contain the "pranic energy" that his followers must abstain from. Taught to reject other forms of music, UM followers commit to in-house esoteric or 'glorious' Benhayon-approved music, such as that by Miranda and Michael Benhayon or the official UM musician Chris James. WFMU music critic Micah Moses says tracks from the UM record label Glorious Music are "contemporary faux urban pop" and "imitation mainstream dreck" that are mostly "unplayable" and "dreadfully bad".

== Treatments and practices ==
"Serge Benhayon is the leader of Universal Medicine, a group which to his knowledge, engages in misleading conduct in promoting the healing services it offers", "makes false claims about healing that cause harm to others" and "preys on cancer patients". "Serge Benhayon as the leader of Universal Medicine exploits the followers of that group through his false and harmful teachings", "had exploited children by having them vouch for Universal Medicine's dishonest healing practices", "has persuaded followers to shun loved ones who won't join his cult" and "is sexually manipulative of his cult followers". "Serge Benhayon is the leader of an exploitative" and "socially harmful cult, which to his knowledge had engaged in dishonest healing practices" and "that is paternalistic to women".

— NSW Supreme Court jury findings, December 6, 2018

Universal Medicine markets practitioner training and accreditation through its Esoteric Practitioners Association Pty Ltd; however, the training and qualifications are not recognised and "esoteric practitioners" are not accredited. Members of the association are charged an annual fee. Clients have been reported to spend tens of thousands of Australian dollars on Universal Medicine products and services.

Benhayon's "esoteric connective tissue therapy" is said to improve the patient's energy flow by "allowing the pulse of the lymphatic system to symbiotically correspond with the body's own ensheathing web". John Dwyer describes the existence of a lymphatic pulse as "utter nonsense".

Universal Medicine also provides counselling services to parents, body-awareness education workshops to young women, cardiosacral pulse and craniosacral readings, as well as "exorcism sessions" where children were reportedly present.

In November 2014, Universal Medicine's treatments were highlighted in a NSW Parliamentary Inquiry report by the Health Care Complaints Committee which states:

"While there is little anecdotal evidence to suggest actual harm caused by these treatments, concerns were raised that patients may forgo seeking proper medical advice and care. Two patients who were undergoing therapies at Universal Medicine were independently diagnosed with cancer and bronchiectasis respectively, and required proper medical intervention in order to be properly treated".

Universal Medicine lobbied the local NSW MP for Ballina Don Page to have these unfavourable comments removed from the Parliamentary Inquiry Report.

Controversy surrounds referrals for esoteric treatments by some doctors, a situation that medical regulators say is difficult to address. During the inquiry Don Page MP said these types of referrals "would give most people considerable concern". Universal Medicine's registered allied health practitioners allegedly encourage followers to seek GP referral for Medicare treatment plans to pay for sessions. A former patient who received treatment from a UM physiotherapist under a Medicare plan reported the "Universal physio claimed her health was improving from 'craniosacral pulse' therapy", however, "her GP ordered tests that found she had cancer". The patient was reportedly told by Universal Medicine that "doctors will make you sicker than you already are". Another patient was told by a thoracic physician and student of UM that conventional HRT was harmful and "deep-seated grief is a major driving factor in lung disease". Dwyer stated that it was "highly reprehensible" that medical professionals registered on a "promise to practise evidence-based medicine" were engaged in promoting "cultish behaviour".

Serge Benhayon has responded to criticism stating that UM does not "interfere with medicine... We do not hold ourselves above medicine. We are super pro medicine". UM conducts retreats such as "the science of Divination". Sydney paediatrician and "Baby Doc" author, Howard Chilton, has endorsed Benhayon as a "teacher of enormous integrity". Chilton has given talks at the company's women's health forums but claims his support for UM is a personal matter unrelated to evidence-based practice. Chilton's daughter Isabella is married to Benhayon's son Curtis. UM associated thoracic surgeon Sam Kim, who has praised Benhayon's esoteric breast massage and states UM is a reputable healing organisation, not a cult. Supporter and Bangalow ophthalmologist Anne Malatt claims her life and work had been inspired by Benhayon, adding that the "core tenet of Serge's teachings is energetic integrity" and "when put into practice on a daily basis, they work". Sydney rheumatologist and UM advocate Maxine Szramka claims to have observed UM student's chronic pain being permanently cured adding UM's esoteric healing practices lead to miracles every day. Her endorsement has now been deleted from the UM website.

UM practises an unproven technique on women called "Deeper Femaleness" claiming it is "great for rape recovery". It involves the "hands-on esoteric healing" of a woman's abdomen and pubic area and manipulation of the woman's pubic bone. UM publications show the therapy is performed by men.

The treatments have been characterised as "sleazy" with one ex-patient comparing her experience to being subjected to a "grooming exercise". UM has responded by taking the ex-patient to the Supreme Court of NSW alleging defamation. The jury found it was substantially true to say "Serge Benhayon makes bogus healing claims" and "is engaged in a healing fraud that harms people".

Benhayon confirmed that in 2009 at Billinudgel in NSW, the group held a "book burning" at the property of his lawyer. Others reported it as "just like the ritual burning of books in Nazi Germany", where Benhayon's students were invited to throw their books onto the pyre. Most books burnt were on Chinese medicine, kinesiology, acupuncture, homeopathy and other alternative healing modalities, all of which Benhayon had decreed "prana" which he considers "evil".

Benhayon insists women should not play sport, stating: "You've become involved with sport, which women should never be, because the right ovary becomes more powerful than the left. They're ready to have a child but the vaginal walls as thick as, and they're not a woman energetically, even though they have breasts, vagina, uterus and so forth". On feminism Benhayon teaches that women are "paying the price" for greater equality in the form of breast cancer, ovarian cancer, endometriosis and period issues. He states women have now moved "into much more male energy" in gaining greater equality and how this was achieved is "energetically not correct".

Serge Benhayon confirms revenue from Universal Medicine provides a living for the whole of the extended Benhayon family. In 2016, he had a taxable income of more than $188,000, and his wife, Miranda, $176,000. Approximately $50,000 of his income came from the Universal Family Trust, which also distributed $129,593 to his daughter Natalie, approximately $100,000 to his son Michael, $59,812 to his son Curtis and a further $34,890 to Curtis' wife Isabella. A further $400,000 went to another company. Benhayon's ex-wife Deborah Benhayon receives a salary as the chief financial officer for UM. Real estate to the value of $5.5 million has been linked to the group, including a $1.75 million property in Brisbane, and a hall valued at $2.3 million. All of his four children hold positions within the organisation.

Serge Benhayon personally holds an extensive multimillion-dollar property portfolio in Northern NSW which includes UM's spititual home "The Hall of Ageless Wisdom" on one of his properties. When in Australia he lives on a private estate near Lismore, and when in England in a house at 'The Lighthouse' estate near Frome in Somerset. 'The Lighthouse' is the European base for UM and is owned by Simon Williams, the ex-president of the local Chamber of Commerce.

== Esoteric breast massage ==
UM operates 'esoteric breast massage' (EBM) programs for women with breast cancer as well as 'breast cancer care retreats' at the cost of $60 per head. Stated by the group to be administered only by women, EBM has been promoted to "cure or prevent breast cancer" by rekindling femaleness. This was described as "irresponsible, dangerous and misleading" by Matthew Lam, research director of Breakthrough Breast Cancer. NSW Cancer Council CEO Andrew Penman said there was no medical evidence massage could prevent breast cancer. Esoteric breast massage claims have also been dismissed by Breast Cancer Network Australia (BCNA). A former esoteric breast massage patient reported Universal Medicine staff told her it would prevent breast cancer by "clearing... all of men's negative energy" accumulated over her lifetime. She recalled it as "the most horrible thing I've ever had in my entire life". Esoteric breast massage also claims "to heal many issues such as painful periods, polycystic ovaries, endometriosis, bloating/water retention, and pre-menstrual and menopausal symptoms". John Dwyer from the University of NSW describes such claims as "ludicrous". According to changes recorded in the web archive, those claims were erased from the esoteric breast massage website coinciding with the onset of media scrutiny in July 2012, along with assertions such as:

"The breasts are emanators of a quality of DIVINE TRUTH that begins at the heart. The heart in connection to the pubic bone chakra, which is aligned to the ovaries, brings the emanation of nurturing out for all to have".

Serge Benhayon instructs his students to "try and avoid as much as possible the nipple area" and when questioned on what aspect of health is addressed by esoteric breast massage in September 2012, he stated: "Disconnection to their bodies". A 2018 poll in the Medical Journal of Australia found that 94% of respondents agreed that doctors who promote "remedies" such as "esoteric breast massage" should be investigated.

== Regulatory and other issues ==
The Australian Health Minister, Greg Hunt, wrote to AHPRA's CEO, Martin Fletcher, regarding "concerns for public safety in relation to the provision of certain services being provided by organisations allegedly with links to cults".

— Northern Star, August 8, 2019

Accusations of misconduct against Universal Medicine have drawn attention from the regulatory bodies; the Australian Health Practitioner Regulation Agency (AHPRA) and the Therapeutic Goods Administration (TGA). The NSW Office of Liquor, Gaming and Racing investigated claims of breach of Australian charitable fundraising laws by the charity the "College of Universal Medicine" and referred these to the police. A 2018 complaint by the Friends of Science in Medicine sparked a Health Care Complaints Commission (HCCC) investigation into UM and associated non-registered practitioners.

Prior to the TGA investigation and their withdrawal from sale UM's herbal remedies were erroneously said to "promote fire in the lungs and therefore help to dispel any dampness in the lungs" and were "good for dealing with hardening of the connective tissue especially around the chest and arms and also hardening of the vascular system".

Benhayon's daughter Simone is one of the Trustees of The Sound Foundation in the UK, a second related charitable organisation that Universal Medicine called one of its "two main world headquarters". The Sound Foundation was the subject of a 2013 complaint to the Charity Commission for England and Wales which found extensive irregularities and resulted in the charity being given a mandatory compliance plan. It also attracted attention from a National Health Service Forum who distanced itself from the group.

Universal Medicine is reported to have received a portion of AUD$709,493 federal funds to provide six public lectures and "counselling services to parents" under a Commonwealth grant scheme applied for by the YWCA. The Australian Government refused to fully release documents explaining how the funds were used, saying "YWCA raised objections... including that the information does not accurately reflect YWCA's activities" and could "have an adverse effect on the YWCA by affecting its relationships with other entities and its reputation".

In 2016, 20 Universal Medicine adherents joined the Australian doctors' reform lobby group, the HPARA, en-masse causing turmoil and a split in the organisation. HPARA chair John Stokes said the UM adherents, who "initially ... all seemed quite impressive and normal," unexpectedly began turning up to meetings and attempted to take over the organisation's social media accounts and board of directors without declaring their UM connections. "Some of them behaved in ways that made me feel quite uncomfortable, where they would come into my personal space," he recalled. Stokes said there were concerns of reprisals and potential legal threats from the UM group, and that he and others expressed concern at HPARA being associated with the cult, but is now confident that no member with links to UM remains in the HPARA.

An investigation by ABC News in April 2018 revealed that The University of Queensland was investigating conflicts of interest of three of its faculty who were "acolytes" advocating for Universal Medicine. Video allegedly shows four researchers, two of whom are doctors, publicly advocating UM practices. Two more of the nine are presenters for the College of Universal Medicine. John Dwyer stated that: "[They] have let the university down badly in their fervour for promoting the benefits of Universal Medicine's approach to treatments, which have no basis in science, couldn't possibly be effective, and really represent a pre-scientific approach to how the body works and interacts with God and the universe". After receiving a 12-page letter from a third-party whistleblower The Journal of Medical Internet Research (JMIR) raised "serious concerns" as to the conflict of interest of the authors of the UM related articles it published. The editorial director stated that: "the omission of this conflict of interest, which appears to be highly significant in this case, is a clear violation of our policies" and suggested both articles published in the JMIR should be retracted. JMIR was also "very concerned" when it was revealed that the "original results paper contained large statistical errors inflating the effect sizes" and concluded "the proposed and executed research does not provide any evidence that any Universal Medicine modalities are effective in making people healthier". When the original peer-reviewers of the papers were made aware of the extensive conflicts of interest, they stated they would not have accepted the manuscripts had they been aware of this fact upon submission.

In November 2018, Universal Medicine was compelled to cancel all their event and hire bookings with Ballina Shire Council, including the Girl to Woman Festival, only days prior to the festival being debated in council chambers. UM took this action after 1,000 people had signed a petition to have the Girl to Woman event barred from Lennox Head Cultural Centre, and also to avoid becoming embroiled in a council policy motion that adopted child-protection measures for future events and hiring "where the Council believes that provision of the service would pose a potential for child abuse". Council's amended policies concerning hiring and the tightening of child-protection measures (not mentioning UM or the girl festival) were adopted, but not before UM had publicly criticised council's actions and long-term UM student and advocate Rebecca Asquith (Baldwin) appeared at the council meeting on behalf of the festival urging councillors to oppose the motion. Council representatives said that UM education events were used as recruitment gateways, urged people to stay away from joining the group and said UM was not wanted in the area.

Subsequent to this, NSW Minister for Health, Brad Hazzard, issued a directive for NSW Health to halt all dealings with Universal Medicine after UM-linked individuals and businesses were found to be involved in the annual Positive Adolescent Sexual Health (PASH) conference. The youth health initiative is backed by the NSW Department of Health and aimed at teens aged 15 years and up. Northern NSW Local Health District chief executive Wayne Jones said that UM members would be removed from the project and NSW Health would: "immediately review engagement and risks of health service involvement with Universal Medicine and discontinue any further association". Lismore MP Thomas George (Nationals) and ALP candidates for Lismore and Ballina, Janelle Saffin and Asren Pugh, supported the directive by the Health Minister. A few days earlier Ms Saffin and ALP candidate for Page Patrick Deegan had called for an inquiry into UM to ensure that no government resources go toward any organisation regarded as a 'cult', and that government departments and agencies do not endorse, encourage or support the involvement of children and young people in any such organisation. Ms Saffin said: "An inquiry [into UM] would be opportunity to clear the air and to restore faith in our local institutions". "It has taken the courage of whistle-blowers and the determination of journalists to expose the predatory practices of Universal Medicine".

Also in November 2018 the NSW child protection agency, Family and Community Services (FACS), issued a staff directive that "no child be referred to Universal Medicine" after at least one UM aligned child protection worker was found to be incorporating UM teachings and events in the care plans of two children overseen by the department. Documents released showed an acting manager and child protection case worker endorsed the girl's involvement with UM activities including the Girl to Woman Festival and Kids in Connection. Care plans instructed that the girl "needs to be supported to maintain her connection with the teachings of Universal Medicine" and that she have "internet access to access readings and meditations from the universal medicine website". After the rogue care plans became public FACS responded that they had "referred the matter to the Office of the Children's Guardian" and "the information in the (Benhayon v Rockett) Supreme Court judgment is known to FACS and staff are taking appropriate action to ensure it has no impact on children known to FACS". UM practitioners were also reported to have attended Lismore FACS staff meetings to conduct relaxation workshops.

Since the Benhayon v Rockett court ruling in Australia, two Church of England schools have decided to stop using the swimming pool run by Benhayon's daughter Simone, which is located at UM's UK headquarters at 'The Lighthouse' in Somerset.

In April 2019, The Lismore Chamber of Commerce in NSW stripped business awards previously awarded to Universal Medicine after a review instigated by the new board of directors. The awards removed after a unanimous decision were: 2014 People's Choice Award, 2015 People's Choice Award, 2017 People's Choice Award, 2017 Excellence in Health Services (Highly Commended), and the 2018 Hall of Fame People's Choice Award. The Chamber said that: "any business that has engaged in any unlawful, fraudulent, misleading, deceptive or other improper misconduct should be refused entry to the business awards." Benhayon claims that Universal Medicine is not liked in the NSW Northern Rivers community because, as he says: "we have standards they cannot meet". UM has been accused of a "them and us" mentality that creates community divisions. Senior UM members and Benhayon family members were once active on the board's of Lismore, Byron Bay and Ballina Chambers of Commerce in NSW and resigned from the Lismore Chamber due to association with UM. Senior UM members have also unsuccessfully run for Liberal and National Party preselection in NSW. In the UK Senior UM members resigned from the board of Frome Chamber of Commerce after their association with UM was reported by the BBC.

=== Australian medical authorities and Samuel Kim ===
Following an investigation by the NSW Medical Council in 2017 a Universal Medicine advocate and affiliated doctor, Samuel Tae-Kyu Kim, was reprimanded for referring a patient for esoteric lung massage and chakra puncture: "knowing there was insufficient evidence for their efficacy as treatments for Patient A's lung condition". The physician, whose clinic is located in the Universal Medicine Clinic in Goonellabah, claimed chakra puncture is an "internationally recognised therapy", however only practised by Universal Medicine. The Council heard evidence from a Senior Specialist and thoracic physician, who stated:

Universal Medicine "affects an attitude which conventional medicine abandoned in the 19th century and this heightens the need to clearly distinguish for patients the difference between conventional medicine and Universal Medicine. Particularly as it is unclear, given it is a relatively new organisation, how Universal Medicine's training programs are accredited".

The HCCC alleged Samuel Kim had withheld conventional therapy and the investigation focused on his referrals to his now wife Jasna Jugovic (esoteric lung massage) and three "Universal Medicine practitioners" Neil Ringe (chakra puncture), Serge Benhayon (spiritual healing) and Michael Serafin (non-medically trained pharmacist). The investigating committee found Kim to lack contrition, and at times to be an unreliable witness and his evidence to be contradictory. Following the enquiry, the HCCC found 5 out of 6 allegations against Kim proven, him "guilty of unsatisfactory professional conduct" (which he admits to), and concluded by placing permanent restrictions upon his practice.

Kim stood down from the Australian Medical Association Queensland council in May 2018 after ABC News investigated a second case of professional misconduct where he had shared the entire medical and medication records of a patient with Serge Benhayon without the patient's knowledge. The patient had criticised Universal Medicine in the media and Kim claims he obtained the patient's verbal consent. The NSW Privacy Commissioner disagreed and found Kim had breached Health Privacy Principles, violated the patients privacy and its report said it was "unclear ... why it was necessary for Kim to provide such a summary of what appears to be Mr Martin's entire medical history to Mr Benhayon". Shaun Rudd, the AMA Queensland chairman, said the council had "a robust conflict of interest policy and AMA Queensland has full confidence in Kim's ability to serve as a councillor". Kim stated that he was a 'student' of Universal Medicine and an honorary advisor at Benhayon's College of Universal Medicine, but had no financial interests in the organisation.

=== Call for Parliamentary Judicial Inquiry ===
In NSW Parliament in August 2019, Lismore MP Janelle Saffin called for a judicial inquiry into UM stating: "I call for an inquiry not because it is a cult, but because it has infiltrated my community, some government departments, agencies and related programs, and non-government organisations, some educational institutions, some media outlets and some business organisations." Among other things she stated that: "It is a cult that has caused the separation of families, is a wealthy commercial enterprise that has a range of subsidiary and related companies operating from Lismore and beyond, and has targeted those who speak out and bullies them in a range of ways, including directly on the streets in my hometown of Lismore and with defamation threats." She concluded by saying: "Professionals who are Universal Medicine socially harmful cult promoters in the workplace are not fit and proper professionals to be in charge of children, the sick, students and the vulnerable."

=== The Taxation Office and the College of UM ===
The Australian Taxation Office (ATO) investigated and took action against the College of Universal Medicine, after almost $600,000 in charitable donations had been collected for its "school building fund" between 2011 and 2015. College director Charles Wilson had initially rejected any suggestion of impropriety. The ATO found the "not for profit" college located in NSW was "not operating a school" because its courses did not qualify as "knowledge-based teaching" for tax purposes. The College was retrospectively stripped of its deductible gift recipient (DGR) status and returned $563,282 back to donors in October 2015.

In reaching its decision the ATO also noted conflicts of interest where the College's fundraising to renovate the building, owned by Serge Benhayon, was a "potential capital benefit" to the owner in earning $80,000 a year in rent from it. It also found most donations to the building fund were not maintained separately to the College's other moneys, meaning "the safeguard of public money is threatened" and the cash could be potentially used "for other purposes".

== Legal issues ==
=== Estate of Judith McIntyre ===
In December 2015, Benhayon appeared at the Supreme Court of NSW when his sizeable inheritance from the estate of devotee Judith McIntyre was challenged by her children. The breast cancer victim's estate was estimated to be worth $1.1 million, $600,000 of which was intended for Serge Benhayon. A further gift of $800,000 was given to Benhayon by McIntyre three days after executing her will. Justice James Stevenson declined to alter the distribution of the estate and issued a ruling stating that Ms McIntyre "appears to have carefully considered how she should dispose of her estate". Prior to her death, UM followers had established themselves as Ms McIntyre's nurse, housemate, financial planner, the witness to her will, the lawyer who drafted it and its executor. Benhayon's solicitor acted for both the benefactor and the beneficiary. In a later unrelated trial, a NSW Supreme Court jury found it was substantially true to say that Benhayon "preys on", "swindles" and "exploits cancer patients by targeting them to leave him bequests in their wills" and that he exercised "undue influence" on Ms McIntyre to inherit the bulk of her million-dollar estate.

Years after the court case, Judith McIntyre's daughter Sarah released her mother's emails that were ruled inadmissible by the court in 2015. Sent during the last few months of her life, they showed Benhayon coaching her dying mother on how to restrict her children's share of her fortune, where he claimed that her children were "trying to destabilise you, trying to evoke your sympathy", which was "an attack on the funds that will help The Hierarchy's work on Earth". Benhayon also warned her against publicly revealing donations because evil spirits known as "the Dark Lodge" could "cause serious harm" to donors. Theologian and minister David Millikan says the emails "reek of coercion, they are very unseemly for a person who is in that sort of powerful position pastorally over the woman who's dying". Shortly before her death, Judith had been persuaded by UM staff to appear in a video blaming herself for her breast cancer, saying: "I had created the disease by all my self neglect, my choices". Daughter Sarah said: "I think my mother was scared for what might happen to her in the afterlife if she didn't give him (Benhayon) the money".

In June 2018, Justice McCallum, of the Supreme Court of NSW, ordered Benhayon to produce photographs and videos of workshops or sessions that relate to the technique of "Deeper Femaleness" which display the "hands on" healing technique practised by Universal Medicine. He was also ordered to produce a list of donations received, tax returns and other financial statements. This pre-trial ruling came as part of the defamation case in which Benhayon attempted to sue blogger, Esther Rockett, for defamation.

=== Benhayon v Rockett Defamation Trial ===
Under cross-examination ... Mr Benhayon had referred to spirits - which he could sense rather than see - being in the courtroom as he gave his evidence. However, he refused the barrister's repeated requests for him to count the spirits, saying he could not break the rule of his soul.

— Australian Associated Press, October 15, 2018

Benhayon unsuccessfully sued blogger Esther Rockett for defamation in the Supreme Court of NSW between 2015 and 2018. He claimed social media posts she had made portrayed him as: delusional, dishonest, a sexual predator and the leader of a "socially harmful cult". Rockett had described Benhayon as a "sleazebag guru" and accused him of performing a "sleazy ovarian reading" on her during a treatment session, inappropriately touching her, and engaging in inappropriate conduct towards women. Rockett - a religious studies graduate who studied cults, New Age and eastern religions - argued the defences of truth and honest opinion in connection to her social media postings. In court Benhayon claimed these portrayals made him feel "raped", saying; "The attempt to demolish my reputation ... you feel raped, you feel you have been stripped". Later he stated that he takes the subject of rape very seriously.

During the 7-week trial, which began in September 2018, Benhayon described himself as a "teacher and practitioner" and also a "business owner". He said his teachings, which are offered as courses, were derived "from the tradition known as the ageless wisdom". He claimed the ageless wisdom had a "very strong lineage that includes the divine messengers", including Hermes, Plato, Pythagoras, Jesus and Muhammad. He told the court that he "had an understanding", which was stronger than a belief, that in one of his many past lives he was Leonardo da Vinci in addition to Pythagoras. Benhayon told Ms Rockett's barrister, Mr Molomby QC, that he could sense discarnate spirits in the courtroom who were nine feet tall, had no feet, and a "crevasse" where the nose was meant to be. He declined to count them and denied this was because he couldn't really feel their presence, saying "I could [count] if I wanted to but it's not something I practise and it's not something I'm allowed to do". Under cross-examination, Benhayon also stated that people who abused their authority - such as dictators and corrupt politicians - are reincarnated as disabled children. He agreed that during a Sacred Esoteric Healing course - level 1, that he had said that the Roman emperor Nero continues to reincarnate as an autistic child, while other authority abusers reincarnate as children with Down syndrome or other disabilities.

The four-person jury completed answers to 58 pages of questions, finding in Ms Rockett's favour and against Mr Benhayon. They found it was substantially true to say he led a "socially harmful cult", made "bogus healing claims", "intentionally indecently touched" her and a number of other clients, and as Ms Rockett claimed, that there were "reasonable grounds to believe" Mr Benhayon intentionally sexually preyed upon her and other clients during treatment sessions. It was also found substantially true to say Mr Benhayon "had an "indecent interest in young girls as young as ten whom he causes to stay at his house unaccompanied", "is guilty of inappropriate behaviour with children" and "is dishonest".

The jury found the imputations that he "vilifies people with disabilities", "exploits cancer patients by targeting them to leave him bequests in their wills", "dishonestly promotes fraudulent ideas of karma for self-gain", "denigrates life and glorifies death" and "is a hypocrite because his Esoteric Healing has death as its goal" were also substantially true. The Northern Star also reported further findings of substantial truth including that "Serge Benhayon engages in inappropriate conduct towards women", "instructed students at Universal Medicine training workshops to touch the genitals of victims of sexual assault", "has engaged in bullying to stop Esther Rockett exposing that he is guilty of inappropriate behaviour with children" and "is not a fit person to hold a Working with Children Certificate".

The jury found imputations that Benhayon was "delusional", had "a propensity to touch girls inappropriately", "groped the genitals of various women under the guise of treating them" or "instilled fear and guilt in children to get them to do his bidding" were not substantially true, instead they were covered by Rockett's defences of honest opinion and qualified privilege. Serge Benhayon has denied all allegations of wrongdoing.

The judge declared that Benhayon's failure to accept a settlement offer made early in the proceedings by the defendant was unreasonable, and was quoted as saying that the "unreasonableness of the plaintiff's refusal to accept the offer is illustrated by the apparent appetite for public humiliation of the defendant", and ordered him to pay Rockett's legal costs on an indemnity basis - a higher rate than usually applies. Benhayon had to pay around $1.2 million to Rockett. Benhayon's Sydney barristers were not criticised for their handling of the case and concluded by informing the court that Benhayon "accepts the analysis of the jury's verdict".

In addition, during final hearings, Justice Lonergan criticised Benhayon's Mullumbimby-based lawyers Universal Law, calling solicitor Paula Fletcher's 31-page legal letter sent to the defendant on the day of Rockett's father's funeral "disgraceful" and "demeaning", saying it contained "personal insults" that were "at best, unprofessional and most discourteous" and "at worst, bullying and harassment". Lonergan added "there is no place for any such personal remarks and insults in any professional correspondence in legal proceedings" and that the letter "suggests that the solicitor who authored them had a lack of independence from, or objectivity about, the litigation". Fletcher's daughter was Benhayon's son's first wife. The judge also commented on other legal demands and machinations from Universal Medicine's legal team regarding a concurrent defamation trial taken out against Rockett in Queensland calling lawyer's actions: "completely preposterous" and "harassment and unreasonable". Fletcher also represented UM members and Benhayon associates, Caroline Raphael and the self-"renowned" Ray Karam in those proceedings in the Brisbane District Court. That case was dismissed. The judge referred Fletcher to the NSW Legal Services Commissioner for alleged unsatisfactory professional conduct or professional misconduct.

Esther Rockett was bankrupted and made homeless by legal actions initiated by Benhayon and his two associates Raphael and Karam. In September 2019, Benhayon and seven other UM members published online retractions and apologies for articles written about Rockett and removed the offending online articles. The apologies were published over three UM websites by authors Simon Asquith, Rachel Hall and Serge Benhayon, and by website administrators Alison Greig, Jonathan Baldwin, Desiree Delaloye, Ray Karam and Isabella Benhayon.

=== Failed attempts to have UM critic criminally charged ===
The ABC reported that in 2015, Eric Walsh a UM member and South Australian (SA) police Sergeant, had coached 30 other UM adherents in attempts to have UM critic Esther Rockett criminally charged by making complaints to the Australian Cybercrime Online Reporting Network (ACORN) and NSW police. The ABC obtained exchanged messages and emails, including 800 and 900 word documents from Walsh directing UM complainants on how to file police reports and pressure a Byron Bay detective. Walsh also sought advice from his SA police colleagues on ways to silence online criticism of UM. Serge Benhayon had encouraged his actions, responding: "This is Gold, Eric... Let's make Esther... 'famous' with the police". The extensive six month bid to have Rockett charged, failed with NSW police and ACORN finding the claims, including inciting violence, were baseless. Walsh is an active UM devotee attending UM retreats and promoting the UM men's group Unfolding Men.

=== UK child protection court case ===
In January 2020, Judge James Meston QC ruled that a mother must make "an immediate and definitive break" from "Universal Medicine... a cult with some potentially harmful and sinister elements" or face losing custody of her daughter. He also found evidence put forward by the father "relating to the harmful and potentially harmful influence and effect of Universal Medicine to be compelling." The ruling, that the mother should "give formal, clear and specific undertakings" to the court that she would disassociate herself and her child "from Universal Medicine and from its specific practices" was appealed by the child's father. In May 2020, three senior judges allowed the appeal, saying the girl "must be distanced entirely from Universal Medicine" and that the mother's involvement with the cult is a "pervasive source of ongoing harm" to the young girl. Lord Justice Peter Jackson, sitting with Lord Justice McCombe and Lady Justice King, said: "Shared care can therefore only continue if the mother makes an immediate and definitive break from the organisation. Otherwise Lara (not the child's real name) should move to live with her father full time and have supervised contact with her mother."

In July 2020, the mother lost custody of her daughter after failing to make a "full-hearted" break from the cult and its "harmful teachings and beliefs". The court ruled that her involvement with the group was a "source of ongoing harm" to the child.

=== Other privacy and confidentiality issues ===
An ex-patient and HCCC complainant, who was vilified on Universal Medicine websites said the organisation accuses "everyone else of cyberbullying while embarking on a systematic, online pack hunt". Numerous students of the organisation unknown to the complainant have openly disputed her medical conditions online. Benhayon has defended the group's right to do so.

The former Queensland mental health commissioner was scathing of Universal Medicine after the UM "Facts Team" breached privacy and published an ex-UM client's full name, image and schizophrenia diagnosis online after he criticised them. Prior to the outing in 2018 the man had been anonymous. The former commissioner Lesley van Schoubroeck said:

it is "entirely inappropriate for any organisation, particularly one purporting to be a health organisation, to publicly reveal identifying information of anyone's diagnosis, be it mental health or physical health" and "people with schizophrenia suffer stigma and discrimination in the workplace and in the community".

When interviewed by the ABC the ex-client expressed concern about his future job prospects owing to the privacy breach.

== Criticism removed from Google searches ==
Universal Medicine uses the services of private investigations firm Phoenix Global for online reputation management. Benhayon says he has nothing to hide and claims the print media has printed "scurrilous lies" and "that the false allegations are nothing but an orchestrated vindictive attack". He and his associates had submitted numerous legal complaints to Google Australia to remove links to Internet news articles, websites or blogs that might question or criticise UM. Google Australia reportedly acted on complaints about more than 15 independent websites, as well as reports from seven news organisations. According to a report in The Daily Telegraph, 36 blogs had been removed. Links to television news reports, ABC radio reports and newspaper articles critical of Universal Medicine had also been removed from Google search results. According to the affected parties, Google undertook the removals without court orders or notifying publishers.

== Subsidiary and affiliated companies and organisations ==
Universal Medicine comprises a number of companies and organisations based in Australia and the UK.

- All Rise Say No to Cyber Abuse PRI/LBG/NSC (UK)
- Ballina Men's Circle
- College of Universal Medicine (Aus registered charity)
- EPA EU/UK (Esoteric Practitioners Association)
- Esoteric Practitioners Association Pty Ltd
- Esoteric Women's Health Pty Ltd
- Evolve College (formerly Australian College of Massage)
- Fabic Pty Ltd
- Featherlight Productions
- Fiery Investments Pty Ltd, Fiery Impulses Pty Ltd
- Foundational Breast Care Ltd
- Gentle Rhythms
- Glorious Music
- Innermost Beauty
- Kids in Connection
- Living Medicine
- Love Camp
- Real Media Real Change Pty Ltd
- Simple Living Global
- Sound Foundation Community Care (UK registered charity)
- Spherical Living Ltd (UK)
- Teachers are Gold
- The Co-Creative
- The Girl to Woman Festival
- The Girl to Woman Project
- Total Health 'From Inside Out' Pty Ltd
- True Movement
- UM Cold Storage & Warehousing
- Unfolding Men
- UniMed Brisbane Pty Ltd
- UniMed Living
- UniMed Perth
- UniMed Publishing
- Universal Healing Symbols
- Universal Law
- Universal Medicine Deutschland, Köln
- Universal Medicine Pty Ltd
- Universal Medicine/The Universal Family (Discretionary) Trust
- Universal Medicine UK Ltd
- Von Innen Heilen, Psychotherapie & Massagetherapie, Sprötze (Hamburg)
- 'Women in Livingness' Magazine
