= Paul Rolan =

Australian physician, researcher, and academic (born 1956)

- Born: January 1956 (age 70)
- Medical career
- Profession: Director - Innovation
- Field: Pharmacology
- Institutions: University of Adelaide
- Sub-specialties: Treatment of chronic pain and headache
- Website: www.profpaulrolan.com.au

Paul Edward Rolan (born January 1956) is an Australian physician, medical researcher, academic, and public health advocate. He specializes in the management of chronic pain and headache, and development of novel treatments.

After his medical training, Rolan worked as Director of Medicine at Cairns Base Hospital and then moved to the UK where he developed new medicines for almost 20 years. Returning to Australia, he took on academic and research roles at the University of Adelaide, becoming the Head of School of Medical Sciences in 2014. Since 2016 he has been the Director of Innovation for the Faculty of Health Sciences. He jointly established the university's Pain and Anaesthesia Research Clinic (PARC). He holds several consultant and board positions, and is Vice President of the Friends of Science in Medicine.

== Medical career ==
Rolan studied medicine at the University of Adelaide, receiving his MBBS in 1979. From 1979 to 1985 he held hospital intern, research and specialist training positions. After obtaining his medical qualifications, Rolan worked at Cairns Base Hospital as Director of Medicine in 1986-7.

Subsequently, Rolan moved to the UK, where he spent nearly 20 years developing new medicines in the pharmaceutical industry. Initially he worked as Head of Clinical Pharmacokinetics for Wellcome Research Laboratories from 1987 to 1994. In the course of this he was responsible for the development of a novel anti-migraine compound, and this was when he developed a particular interest in headaches, which would remain a focus throughout his career. The novel conceptual work on the use of biomarkers in exploratory development at Wellcome formed the basis of his MD from the University of Adelaide in 1995; his thesis subject was "The exploratory clinical development of tucaresol, an antisickling agent, using a novel surrogate marker". In 1994 he moved into the role of Medical Director at the contract research company Medeval. He has been Principal Investigator in over 700 clinical research studies.

Rolan returned to the University of Adelaide in 2005. From 2005 to 2014 he was Professor of Clinical Pharmacology at the University of Adelaide and Senior Consultant in the Pain Management Unit at Royal Adelaide Hospital. In 2014 he was appointed Head of School of Medical Sciences. In 2015-2016 he worked as Director of Drug Development at iX Biopharma, Singapore, then he returned to the University of Adelaide in 2016 as Director of Innovation for the Faculty of Health Sciences.

Rolan partnered with Guy Ludbrook, Professor of Anaesthesia at the Royal Adelaide Hospital, to research links between chronic pain and the immune system. This led them to establish the Pain and Anaesthesia Research Clinic (PARC) within the Royal Adelaide Hospital. PARC is a clinical research unit that blends academic and commercial disciplines. It undertakes commercial studies on behalf of the international pharmaceutical industry, generally in the areas of pain and anaesthesia with drugs that often have a narrow therapeutic index, so intense medical and nursing care are needed. Retained profits from PARC support the university's academic research program.

Rolan was a member of the National Medicines Policy Committee and represented it at the Asia-Pacific regional level. Since 2016 he has been Consultant Chief Medical Officer to the biopharmaceutical company Bionomics Ltd. He consults as a pain physician to Wellend Health, and since 2018 a Pain Management Senior Consultant Physician at the Specialist Ambulatory Rehabilitation Centre (SpARC), Modbury Hospital. He is a non-executive Director of Lipotek, a member of the Scientific Advisory Board of GPN Vaccines, and a Committee member of the Australian Pain Relief Association.

Rolan's major clinical and academic focus is in treatment of chronic pain, from the underlying causes of disease to development of biomarkers and evaluation of new therapies. Other research interests include predicting drug interactions with oral anticoagulants and decision support software regarding drug interactions for GPs.

== Community engagement ==
In addition to his formal academic roles, Rolan has actively promoted public health and a science-based approach to medicine.

He is often called on by media to give expert commentary on a wide range of pharmaceutical topics including chronic headache caused by long-term overuse of medication, how codeine can increase pain sensitivity, implications of sex bias in medical trials, and the use of Botox for treating migraines.

What do you call an alternative medicine that works?
It's a medicine.

- Paul Rolan,

His expertise is also utilized on matters of alternative health practices and scams, such as alkaline water which he described as "a nine or 10 on the Richter scale of BS", or the billions of dollars Australians are spending on unproven vitamins and nutrition supplements.

He gained significant media attention in 2011 after he raised a formal complaint with the Therapeutic Goods Administration about false and misleading advertising by the popular over-the-counter medicine Nurofen.

In 2019 Rolan took on the role of Vice President of the "Friends of Science in Medicine", which the University of Adelaide says "promotes evidence-based medicine and opposes the uncritical spread of unproven alternative therapies".

== Published works ==
As of February 2021, Google Scholar lists 154 publications by Rolan, and PubMed lists 98. Google Scholar estimates his h-index as 42.

He has also published the following book chapters:

- Rolan, P. (2006) "Clinical Pharmacokinetics". In The Textbook of Pharmaceutical Medicine (5 ed., pp. 176–197). Malden, Mass: Blackwell Publishers Inc.
- Tfelt-Hansen, P., & Rolan, P. (2006) "β adrenoceptor blocking drugs in migraine prophylaxis". In The headaches (3rd ed., pp. 519–528). Philadelphia, Pa.; London: Lippincott Williams & Wilkins.
- Dahlof, C., Rolan, P., & Tfelt-Hansen, P. (2006) "Principles of clinical pharmacology, randomized controlled clinical trials, and evidence-based medicine in headache". In The headaches (3rd ed., pp. 55–62). Lippincott Williams & Wilkins.
- Tfelt-Hansen, P., & Rolan, P. (2006) "Nonsteroidal anti-inflammatory drugs in the acute treatment of migraines". In J. Oelsen, P. Goadsby, N. Ramadam, P. Tfelt-Hansen, & K. Welch (Eds.), The headaches (3 ed., pp. 449–458). Philadelphia: Lippincott Williams & Wilkins.
- Rolan, P., & Molnar, V. (2006) "The assessment of pharmacokinetics in early phase drug evaluation". In Clinical Trials of Drugs and Biopharmaceuticals (pp. 123–132). USA: Taylor & Francis.
- Rolan, P (2007). "Physiological and laboratory makers of drug effect". In Atkinson, Arthur J Jr.; Daniels, Charles E; Markey, Sanford P; Abernethy, Darrell R & Dedrick, Robert L (eds.). Principles of Clinical Pharmacology. San Diego: Academic Press. pp. 275–283. doi:10.1016/B978-012369417-1/50057-2. ISBN 978-0-12-369417-1.
- Rolan, P & Molnár, V (2013). "Chapter 5: Clinical Pharmacokinetics". In Griffin, John P; Posner, John & Barker, Geoffrey R (eds.). The Textbook of Pharmaceutical Medicine. John Wiley & Sons, Ltd. pp. 113–131. doi:10.1002/9781118532331.ch5. ISBN 9780470659878.
