= John Dwyer (medicine) =

Australian public health advocate (born 1939)

John Dwyer AO
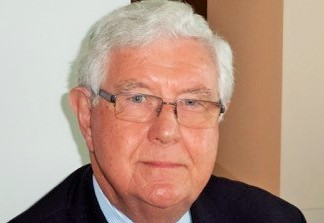
- Born: 9 September 1939 (age 87); Melbourne, Australia
- Education: MB, BS in Medicine and Surgery (University of Sydney); PhD in Immunology (University of Melbourne)
- Known for: Evidence-based medicine
- Medical career
- Profession: Emeritus Professor of Medicine
- Field: Immunology
- Institutions: University of New South Wales; Prince of Wales Hospital

John Michael Dwyer, AO (born 9 September 1939) is an Australian doctor, professor of medicine, and public health advocate. He was originally a Professor of Medicine and Paediatrics, then Head of the Department of Clinical Immunology at Yale University. Returning to Australia, he became Head of the Department of Medicine and the Clinical Dean at the University of New South Wales and Director of Medicine at Sydney's Prince of Wales Hospital, the University's major teaching hospital, for over twenty years. In retirement he is an Emeritus Professor of Medicine of the University. He founded the Australian Health Care Reform Alliance, and was the founding president of the Friends of Science in Medicine until 2019. He was appointed an Officer of the Order of Australia for his service to public health.

== Early life and education ==
Dwyer was born in Melbourne, Australia on 9 September 1939. He attended St Patrick's College, Strathfield. He gained his medical degree (MB, BS in Medicine and Surgery) from the University of Sydney, graduating in 1964. He worked as resident and registrar at St Vincent's Hospital in Sydney, becoming a Fellow of the Royal Australasian College of Physicians (FRACP) as a consultant physician in 1968.

He was awarded a scholarship from the Australian Asthma Foundation to undertake a year of research at Sydney's Garvan Institute. This experience led him to pursue an academic career. In 1969 he was appointed a Research Fellow at the Walter and Eliza Hall Institute in Melbourne, where he pursued a PhD in Clinical Immunology from the University of Melbourne. His thesis was entitled "Cellular Interactions with Antigens in the Immune Response", and he graduated in 1972.

== Medical career ==
After completing his PhD, Dwyer took up a one-year scholarship at Yale University in the USA. He was offered a Howard Hughes Medical Institute career development award in 1973, and a similar scholarship from the US National Institutes of Health and continued his career in the US. During his 14 years at Yale, he became the Professor of Medicine and Paediatrics, and he was Head of the Department of Clinical Immunology for seven years. During this time AIDS emerged and Dwyer was engaged with the early efforts to identify and treat the disease. He conducted research into the role that T8 cells play in AIDS.

In 1985 he returned to Australia as Professor of Medicine and Head of the School of Medicine at the University of New South Wales. He was also the Director of Medicine for the University's major teaching hospital, the combined Prince Henry / Prince of Wales Hospital. At the time, the growth of HIV/AIDS was his major area of research and clinical work, including the introduction of anti-retroviral drugs.

The moral panic associated with AIDS meant that he also had to deal with political considerations. In 1987 he was a foundation member of the National Advisory Committee on AIDS (NACAIDS), which made a range of recommendations including syringe exchange programs in prisons and not segregating HIV-positive prisoners. These recommendations were not adopted at the time due to their political unpopularity. He emphasised that years of experience in managing HIV/AIDS have confirmed that legislation and policy is most effective when it respects the human rights of the people concerned, especially non-discrimination, equality, and due process.

In 1989, he was a senior adviser to NSW Health Minister Peter Collins and the Chief Health Officer, Sue Morey, during the events where Sharleen Spiteri, an HIV-positive sex worker, was forcibly detained. Dwyer had argued against this course of action, but he lost that argument, stating later that Collins was "quite open about saying that he felt he had to be seen to be being tough … and protecting the community." Dwyer was then obliged to hold Spiteri in a locked ward in his own hospital unit for a short time. This came to public attention when the television show 60 Minutes featured the controversy. Dwyer went on to found the AIDS Society of Asia and the Pacific, which still convenes bi-annual international conferences on HIV/AIDS in the Asia Pacific region, becoming its first president.

Throughout his career Dwyer continued his research and he is an author of 184 articles on PubMed. He has also written books, including:

- Management of the immune-compromised patient. Cutter Biological, 1983
- The Body at War: The Miracle of the Immune System. NAL, 1989; ISBN 0-453-00646-9

Dwyer served as Professor and Clinical Dean of the Faculty of Medicine for more than twenty years, until his retirement in 2006. Following his retirement from full-time teaching, he was appointed as an Emeritus Professor at the University of NSW and he is a Director of the Prince of Wales Hospital Foundation.

== Public health advocacy ==
In addition to his formal academic roles, Dwyer has been involved with bodies that advise policy, including co-chairman of the Medical Staff Executive Council of NSW. He has pushed strongly for a reform of the way health care is delivered in Australia. Since retiring from his full-time academic position, Dwyer has become a champion for evidence-based medicine and for educating the general public.

"As a doctor I know that even the most intelligent of us, faced with a life-threatening situation, may suspend our normal good judgement and be easily exploited."

— John Dwyer

Dwyer is a passionate advocate for structural reform of Australia's primary care system, which he says fails to provide preventive strategies to minimise lifestyle-related chronic and complex diseases, which in turn place enormous strain on public hospitals. He advocates the "Medical Home" concept that features multi-disciplinary primary care teams who facilitate an approach that involves the community seeking clinical help to stay well, not just treat disease.

He is frequently quoted in the press as an expert on matters such as managing the costs of health care, the risks of having universities become dependent on corporate sponsorship, anti-vaccine conspiracy theories, and unproven practices such as homeopathy, "detoxification", nutritional supplements, "slapping therapy" or "esoteric breast massage".

Dwyer pressures the government to stop using public funds to support unproven practices. The Australian taxation system provides a rebate to help cover the premiums for people who take out private health insurance. Benefits paid for natural therapies have been increasing rapidly in spite of lack of testing: Choice magazine estimates that over the 10 years to 2015, benefits paid for natural therapies increased 345%. In 2014, after the National Health and Medical Research Council (NHMRC) review of global research into homeopathy found it had no efficacy, Dwyer called on the government to stop supporting it financially via the government rebate to private health insurers.

He advocates a combination of orthodox medicine with so-called "alternative medicine" based on the strength of the available evidence, rather than thinking of them as two separate systems: "The challenge we now face involves creating a converging pathway that will incorporate the best of CAM and orthodox medicine into unified and routine management plans."

=== Advisory committee to the Minister for Health ===
In 2002, Dwyer chaired the New South Wales Healthcare Complaints and Consumer Protection Advisory Committee (HCCPAC) (informally called the "Quackwatch Committee"), whose objective was to tighten controls on "wonder drugs" and "miracle cures", and to "combat dodgy cures and health practices".

This advisory committee identified the following systemic issues with the health care system:

- Medical boards need tougher standards and more power to enforce them, to protect consumers.
- Advertising makes claims that have no basis in reality. Voluntary codes of practice have not been effective at preventing this.
- Medical practitioners are trained in standardised ways, which leads to consistent advice, but this is not the case for alternative practitioners, leaving the consumer without any protection.
- Fines for acting fraudulently are so small that they are not effective as a deterrent.
- The Therapeutic Goods Administration (TGA) is the Government's nominal watchdog to protect consumers, but it does not have the resources it needs to do the job effectively.
- Co-ordination between the state and federal bodies that aim to protect consumers is not effective.

The committee's conclusion was its recommendation to form an inter-agency committee incorporating the Australian Competition & Consumer Commission, the Department of Fair Trading, the Health Care Complaints Commission and the TGA to facilitate working together.

=== Australian Health Care Reform Alliance ===
In 2003, Federal and State governments were negotiating the funding of public hospitals but little attention was paid to non-hospital approaches such as preventive care, early diagnosis, community-based health care, mental health, indigenous health and workforce health. Dwyer pointed out that there are dependencies between these, for example every day the Prince of Wales Hospital was forced to turn away ambulances, because its emergency departments were filled with patients who could not get a bed in a nursing home, or who had no access to a bulk-billing doctor. At the time, Dwyer was chairman of the National Hospitals Clinicians' task force, and this prompted him to look at options for a more balanced system. He approached other health organisations to form an alliance that could provide a co-ordinated response on major health reform issues. The result was that he founded the Australian Health Care Reform Alliance (AHCRA). The AHCRA aimed to inform the political decision-making process by representing the Australian Medical Association, the Nursing Federation, Catholic Health, the deans of all the medical schools, Access Economics, physicians, surgeons, rural doctors, and consumers.

Initially, its executive organizations were the Australian Healthcare Association, Royal Australian College of General Practitioners, National Rural Health Alliance, Australian Consumers' Association, Royal Australasian College of Physicians, Australian Council of Social Service, Doctors Reform Society, Health Consumers Network, Australian Physiotherapy Association and Health Issues Centre. Three years later, the Australian Nursing Federation joined the executive of the AHCRA. Their evaluation of the AHCRA at that time was that it "has already proved to be a powerful force in persuading governments and the community about the necessity and value of making fundamental changes to the structure and funding of Australian health care."

=== NSW Government Inter-Agency Committee on health care fraud ===
He is the Clinical Consultant to the NSW Inter-Agency committee examining ways to better protect consumers from health related fraud.

=== Friends of Science in Medicine ===
In 2011, Dwyer formed the organization Friends of Science in Medicine (FSM) with a group of Australian doctors, medical researchers and scientists. Dwyer was the inaugural president, a role that he held until early 2019. FSM was formed "to emphasise the importance of having health care in Australia based upon evidence, scientifically sound research and established scientific knowledge."

As of 2014, the organisation's membership included over 1000 doctors, researchers and supporters, including Nobel laureates and three winners of Australian of the Year.

=== Training and regulation of unproven methods ===
"It's terribly important that alternative medicine in Australia is underpinned by credible evidence and science."

— John Dwyer

Dwyer supports conducting robust research in complementary practices, and adopting the ones that prove to be safe and effective. He strongly opposes teaching practices which are not supported by good evidence, especially when they are presented to students as if they were.

National registration has led to many alternative practitioners being registered by the Australian Health Practitioners Registration Authority (AHPRA), which is the same federal body that covers doctors and nurses. However, the alternative practitioners are not required to provide evidence of their methods' efficacy because they are deemed low-risk. At the same time, a number of colleges and even universities run courses in supplementary, complementary and alternative methodologies. Dwyer has raised concerns that instead of providing improved accountability, these changes may simply confer an appearance of respectability and professionalism which is not warranted: he told Australasian Science that "it is increasingly difficult to encourage patients to accept only evidence-based treatments for their problems when some universities and indeed private health insurers, provide unacceptable, often dangerous practices with undeserved credibility."

In 2011, he organized a group of 34 prominent Australian doctors, medical researchers and scientists who wrote an open letter to Central Queensland University to express their concerns about its plans to teach “alternative medicine" courses as if they were science. They were concerned that this would be misleading to the public, that public money would be wasted, and that it would damage the credibility of Australia's university system: "such initiatives diminish the academic reputation of participating institutes and Australian science as they give credibility to pseudoscience or blatant anti-science." Similarly, in The Medical Journal of Australia in February 2014 he argues that the pharmaceutical industry's growing practice of selling homeopathic and naturopathic preparations, and nutritional supplements, seriously undermines their standing as trusted professionals, and that "one can only imagine that commercial reasons dominate."

Dwyer made strong public statements in support of Ken Harvey after Harvey resigned his post at La Trobe University in protest when a vitamin company funded the university to set up a centre whose emphasis was to study that company's own products. Writing for the Medical Journal of Australia, Dwyer highlighted the potential for a conflict of interest, to the detriment of the university, and he concluded that there is no value in repeating this research which has been done many times.

== Awards and recognition ==
Dwyer was appointed an Officer of the Order of Australia (OA) in 1991, in recognition of his "service to public health, particularly through the treatment and prevention of infectious diseases".

He was appointed Emeritus Professor to recognize his distinguished service to the University of NSW, and the John Dwyer Lecture Theatre in the Prince of Wales Hospital is named after him.

He is a Fellow of the Royal Australasian College of Physicians, a Fellow of the Royal College of Physicians of Ireland, and an Honorary Doctor of the Australian Catholic University.

In 2000, he was named as the "Skeptic of the Year" by the Australian Skeptics, and in 2012 he again won that award jointly with the other founding members of Friends of Science in Medicine.

He has been a director of the Prince of Wales Hospital Foundation since 2008. He is the patron of the Foundation's Nightingale Bequest Society, having previously served as its Chairman, and he is on its Grant Round Committee. His other board appointments include Eastern Sydney Area Health Board, and South-East Sydney Area Health Board.

== Criticisms ==
Most of the criticisms in the literature are directed at the Friends of Science in Medicine organization, rather than at Dwyer personally. Kerryn Phelps, former president of the Australian Medical Association and of the Australian Integrative Medicine Association called Friends of Science in Medicine an "ultra-conservative" force with "an alarming and far-reaching agenda". She debated Dwyer on the topic of FSM's call to stop universities from teaching unproven methods, when Phelps disagreed strongly with Dwyer's standard of what constituted acceptable evidence, and how universities should deal with alternative practices.

Jon Wardle from the Australian Research Centre in Complementary and Integrative Medicine at the University of Technology Sydney described FSM as "the new poster child for CAM [Complementary and Alternative Medicine] conspiracy theorists".

== Personal life ==
Dwyer married Catherine Thrower in 1966. They have three children: Justin (born 1967), Gabrielle (born 1968), and Christopher (born 1974).
