= Ken Harvey =

Ken Harvey may refer to:

- Ken Harvey (baseball) (born 1978), baseball player
- Ken Harvey (American football) (born 1965), former NFL linebacker
- Ken Harvey (professor), Australian professor at Bond University and critic of pharmaceutical marketing and complementary medicines

== See also ==
- Kenneth J. Harvey (born 1962), Canadian writer
