= Loretta Marron =

Australian public health advocate (born 1951)

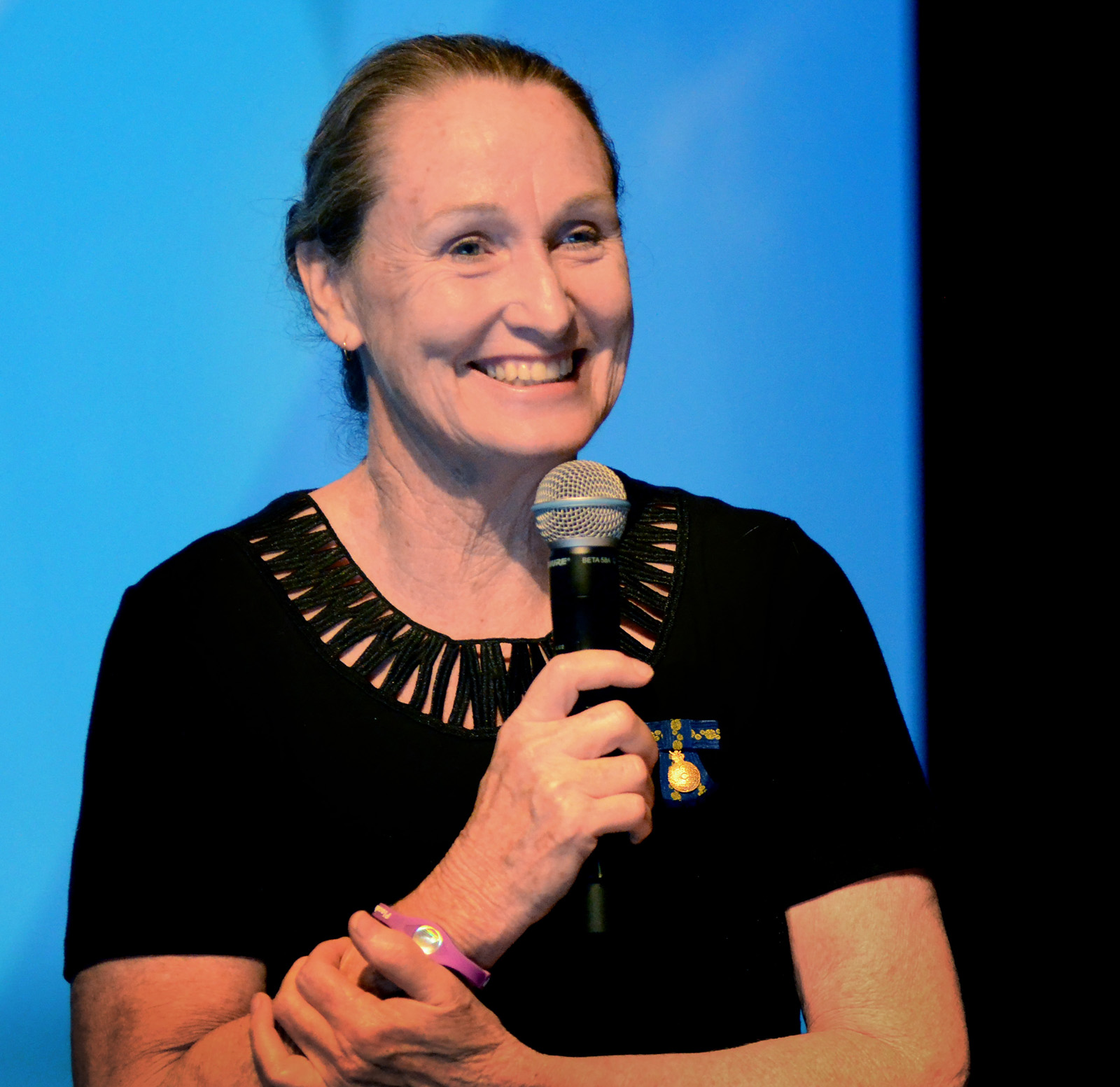
- Speaking at the Australian Skeptics National Convention 2015
- Born: 16 October 1951 (age 75); Hanover, West Germany
- Other name: The Jelly Bean Lady
- Employer: Friends of Science in Medicine
- Known for: Evidence-based medicine
- Title: Chief Executive Officer

Loretta Josephine Marron, OAM (born 16 October 1951) is the chief executive officer of the Australian Friends of Science in Medicine organization. Popularly known as the "Jelly Bean Lady", she has promoted an evidence-based approach to medicine since being diagnosed with cancer herself in 2003. In the media, she has presented exposés of unproven treatments, some of which have resulted in successful legal prosecutions. She was awarded the Medal of the Order of Australia for her service to health, and she has been "Skeptic of the Year" three times.

== Background ==
Marron was born in Hanover, West Germany in 1951. Her family moved to the United Kingdom in 1954, and then to South Australia in 1959. She graduated with a Bachelor of Science from the University of Adelaide in 1972, with majors in Physics and Mathematics. She spent her career working as an information technology specialist.

In 2003, she was diagnosed with breast cancer. At her cancer support group, she was exposed to promotions for a range of alternative treatments, many of which urged her to reject conventional medicine and not to have surgery or chemotherapy. However, her research revealed that there was a lack of evidence to support the effectiveness of those alternative treatments. Marron said she became horrified to see how charlatans were attempting to take advantage of her and fellow sufferers, offering treatments with no verifiable benefits, often while charging large fees, and this drove her to expose the worst practices of people who promote unproven, "alternative" approaches.

"It's understandable that people reach out for alternatives when they are ill. But they don't work...People are hanging on for a panacea that, regrettably, does not exist", she says.

== Support for evidence-based medicine ==
Marron began campaigning against the "outrageous claims" made by some alternative therapists, instead promoting that people should have access to reliable, evidence-based information. "They need protecting; they are victims twice — first of the disease, and then of the behaviour of alternative therapists."

She studied a series of short courses at Bond University in the Faculty of Health Science and Medicine to improve her understanding of the issues, but she emphasizes that she is not a medical professional. Instead, she has worked with medical specialists, researchers, and practitioners to ensure her information is backed by evidence. Initially she worked with her GP and the Adverse Medicines Advice service to create a brochure on how to get good advice, and then a website called Health Information, aimed at helping other patients to get trustworthy medical information that is based on reliable evidence.

Marron approached the Therapeutic Goods Administration (TGA) for assistance, but their policy was that if a product could claim "traditional use" then they would list it without needing any assessment of whether that product was safe or effective. She told The Australian newspaper that the lax oversight means "the internet is now flooded with incorrect information on therapeutic goods, many of which are TGA-approved." Some of the claims for these products included promising to "nourish the fei", "tonify the qi", transform "turbid dampness", "nourish the blood", harmonise the "middle jiao", or to stimulate "energy meridians to aid stress relief". Listing a product with the TGA simply entailed entering some details on the TGA's website and paying their fee. Even where there is testing, "sponsor 'evidence' could be a trial with two rats and a guinea pig – it does not have to be peer-reviewed". Marron told The Australian newspaper that "it's really easy to make money with the current rules – just find any garden weed that has a traditional use, put it in a box with flowers or a has-been athlete, list it with the TGA and go on a marketing blitz – and rake in the money." She pointed out that the enormous amount of money involved in supplementary, complementary and alternative medical treatments, estimated by The Sydney Morning Herald as $1.8 billion per annum in Australia, is an incentive to continue these practices regardless of the public welfare. "Desperate people will do anything when they are sick", she says.

Her investigations into unsupported claims started with fundamental (vitalistic) chiropractic practitioners who claimed to cure a range of unrelated conditions and to be an alternative to vaccination. In the state of New South Wales, she identified 50 chiropractic practitioners whose treatment plans explicitly covered pregnant women, babies, and children. She published her findings in a report to the Australian Health Minister, which was also supported by the British Medical Journal, calling for a ban on chiropractic treatment of babies and children, and for an end to teaching these "inappropriate and potentially dangerous techniques that target pregnant women, babies, infants, and children". In particular, she called for the chiropractic pediatric clinic run by the Royal Melbourne Institute of Technology (RMIT) University, which recorded 113 patients aged 13 and under, to be closed down, and to stop using government funds to pay for these practices.

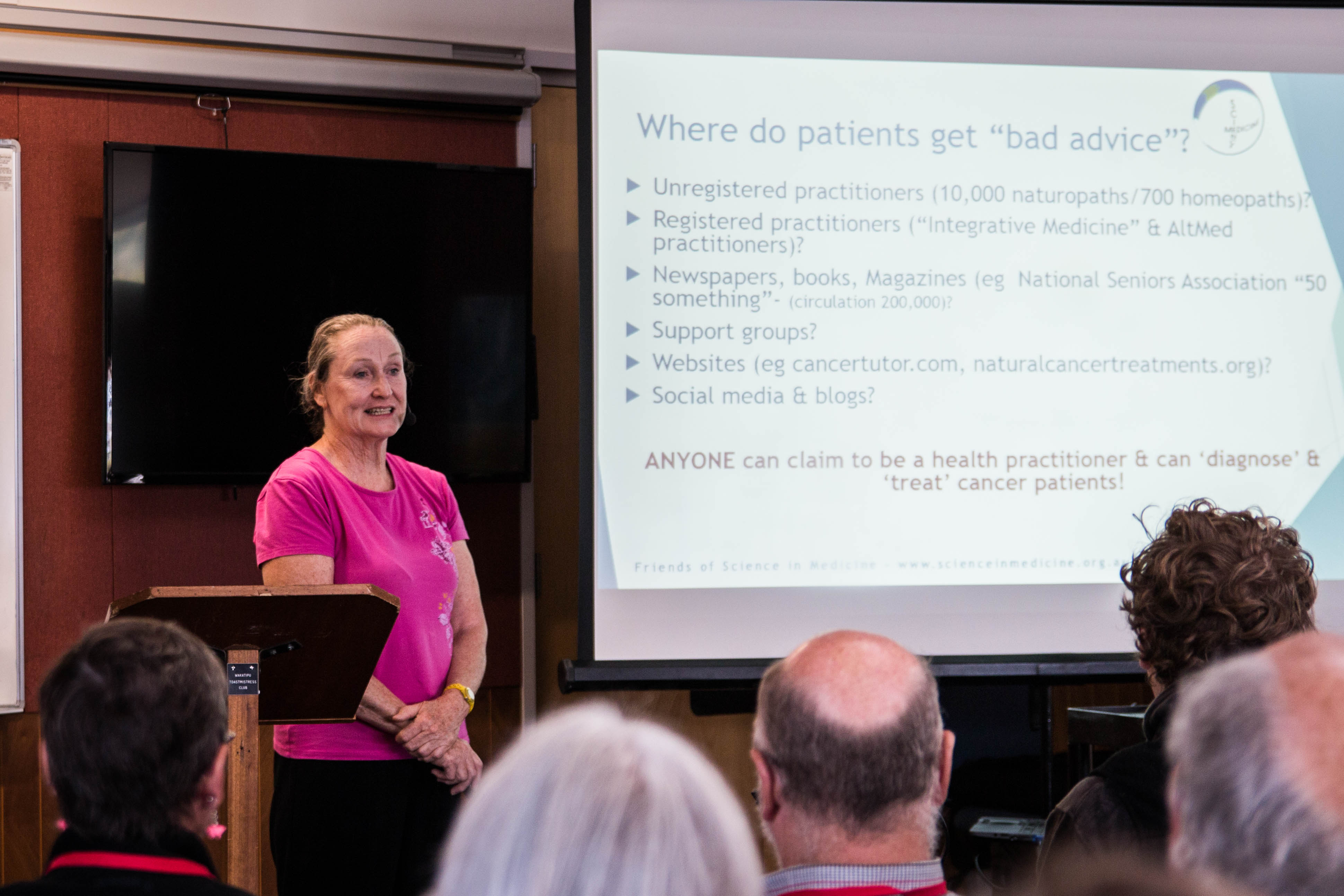
Speaking to the New Zealand Skeptics 2016

=== Jelly bean lady ===
Marron developed a character loosely based on advertisements for a "natural therapist" and substituting "jelly bean" instead to highlight some of the more ridiculous claims. She started to refer to this role as a "Jelly bean therapist", complete with a range of mock jelly bean "therapies".

Marron became known as "the Jelly Bean Lady" after she used jelly beans to test magnetised mattress underlays, which the makers claimed could cure a range of health ailments. She substituted jelly beans for the magnets in one of the underlays, and had participants test them using a meter that measures magnetism. They were not able to tell which one had the magnets and which one had the jelly beans through the mattress – the results were the same. This trial was telecast on Channel Nine, and their journalist suggested the name "Jelly Bean Lady" which Marron stayed with. Her conclusion that the magnets were just as effective as jelly beans, was an effective way to communicate the results accurately to a non-technical audience, without using jargon about topics such as controls and blinding.

She further developed this persona of "the Jellybean Lady", including colourful clothing to play well on television, as a fun way to engage people's attention while being easily identifiable. Later in New Idea magazine it was changed slightly to become the "Candy Crusader". It also helped to keep a clear distinction that she was not a medical professional.

Over this period, she became a frequent contributor to the media, including investigative journalism pieces to expose alternative therapists making false and misleading claims. A high-profile investigation on A Current Affair involved a beauty therapist who claimed that she could cure cancer by injecting sufferers with a mixture of citric acid and sodium chlorite. Marron's under-cover investigation was covered on national television, including showing the practitioner mixing up and injecting the mixture into Maria Worth, who was dying of breast cancer and paid $2000 for the "treatment". Four days later, Worth was in the emergency ward at Toowoomba Hospital with life-threatening blood clots. Marron's evidence contributed to the Supreme Court's determination that the practitioner was unqualified and unregistered, ordering her to discontinue the treatment in 2009.

Her investigations into fraudulent practices led to cancellations of the approvals for nine alternative "medical" devices from the Australian Register of Therapeutic Goods in 2010, and another 31 in 2011.

=== Friends of Science in Medicine ===
In 2011, Marron joined with a group of 34 prominent Australian doctors, medical researchers and scientists, to form the organization Friends of Science in Medicine (FSM). Marron was the inaugural chief executive officer. FSM was formed "to emphasise the importance of having health care in Australia based upon evidence, scientifically sound research and established scientific knowledge."

The organization has grown to gain the support of over 1000 doctors, researchers and supporters, including Nobel laureates and three winners of Australian of the Year.

Marron's role as the public face of this organization has included submissions to the Therapeutic Goods Administration (TGA) and presentations to professional conferences including the Australian Institute of Medical Scientists conference (AIMS) and the Australian and New Zealand College of Anaesthetists (ANZCA).

=== Training and regulation of unproven methods ===
National registration has led to many alternative practitioners being registered by the Australian Health Practitioners Registration Authority (AHPRA), which is the same federal body that covers doctors and nurses. However, the alternative practitioners are not required to provide evidence of their methods' efficacy because they are deemed low-risk. At the same time, a number of colleges and even universities run courses in supplementary, complementary and alternative methodologies. Marron is concerned that instead of providing improved accountability, these changes may simply confer an appearance of respectability and professionalism which is not warranted: "Once they are regulated, that legitimises them, but it comes with a responsibility to consumers; they can't have it both ways," she says.

Marron is particularly critical of universities which teach courses in unproven treatments, some of which have lecturers who promote their own practices and products in the process. In 2011, she wrote to the Federal Health Minister outlining the seriousness of the problem, which she said "is a form of child abuse", calling for universities to stop teaching health-related courses which could not produce adequate evidence to support their claims. The submission incorporated 20 pages of supporting letters from leading academics and clinicians. It focussed especially on the RMIT University chiropractic paediatric clinic, which dismissed the claims it was teaching techniques that could be harmful, although it acknowledged there was an "overall lack of high-level clinical evidence in chiropractic".

Speaking with the journal Australian Doctor, she said: "It never occurred to me before that they would teach this type of nonsense in a university." She was more forthright in an interview with The Australian newspaper, saying she felt "ashamed that our universities, once deemed to be pillars of excellence and enlightenment, are letting the bean-counters who run them sell off their reputations for considerable profit by actively embracing subjects no better than witchcraft and voodoo".

Marron supports giving students the knowledge to critically appraise all therapies. She is concerned that the lack of consistent standards currently does not support this: "The two victims of the self-regulatory system are consumer health and truth." Universities had to keep a close eye on what was actually being said in courses and included in the teaching material, she said.

== Awards and recognition ==
Marron was awarded the Order of Australia Medal (OAM) in the General Division of the 2014 Australia Day honours, in recognition of her "service to community health".

Marron was named "Skeptic of the Year" by the Australian Skeptics twice (in 2006–2007, and 2011) individually in recognition of her "great contributions to public health and the exposure of dangerous and discredited treatments that profit through offering spurious cures to the vulnerable and ill", and again in 2012 as the representative of Friends of Science in Medicine. In 2016, she was awarded life membership of the Australian Skeptics.

== Criticisms ==
Kerryn Phelps, former president of the Australian Medical Association and of the Australian Integrative Medicine Association, opposed Marron's call to stop universities from teaching unproven methods. She argued that these treatments are already part of mainstream society. "There is a consumer-led movement ... people are looking for different ways to manage their illnesses", she said. She called Friends of Science in Medicine an "ultra-conservative" force with "an alarming and far-reaching agenda". However, she conceded that "if natural therapies are found to be ineffective or dangerous, they should also be eliminated from the market".

== Selected publications ==
- Harvey, Ken J; Korczak, Viola S; Marron, Loretta J; Newgreen, David B (7 January 2008). "Commercialism, choice and consumer protection: regulation of complementary medicines in Australia". Medical Journal of Australia. 188 (1). Australian National Prescribing Service: 21–25. doi:10.5694/j.1326-5377.2008.tb01498.x. ISSN 1326-5377. PMID 18205557. S2CID 20700660.
- McGuire TM, Walters JA, Dean AJ, Van Driel M, Del Mar C, Kotsirilos V, Moses GM, Chong S, Deed G, Eldred B, Hardy J, Heussler H, Hollingworth S, Marron L, Mendel J, Pache D, Steadman K, Trenerry H, Brown J, Williamson M (March 2009). "Review of the Quality of Complementary Medicines Information Resources: Summary Report" (PDF). Australian National Prescribing Service. Archived from the original (PDF) on 4 March 2016.
- Marron, Loretta (October 2009). "Regulating Treatments "Down Under"" (PDF). HealthWatch Newsletter (75). U.K.
- Olver, Ian; Robotin, Monica, eds. (2012). "Ch. 21 The Perspective of a Cancer Patient by Loretta Marron". Perspectives on complementary and alternative medicines. London: Imperial College Press. ISBN 9781848165571.
- Marron, Loretta. "The US NCCIH: What is it?" (PDF). HealthWatch Newsletter (97, Spring 2015). U.K.
- O'Sullivan, Jack; Del Mar, Chris; Barnes, Alex; Marron, Loretta J (March 2016). "Acupuncture in Australia". Focus on Alternative and Complementary Therapies. 21 (1): 22–24. doi:10.1111/fct.12228.
- Marron, Loretta (Spring 2018). "The 'rise and rise' of Traditional Chinese Medicine" (PDF). The HealthWatch Newsletter (107): 7–9.
