= Therapeutic Goods Act 1989 =

Australian law

Parliament of Australia
- Long title: An Act relating to therapeutic goods
- Citation: Therapeutic Goods Act 1989 (Cth)
- Territorial extent: Australia
- Assented to by: Governor-General Bill Hayden
- Assented to: 17 January 1990
- Administered by: Department of Health
- Bill citation: Therapeutic Goods Bill 1989 (Cth)
- Introduced: 5 October 1989

Repeals
- Therapeutic Goods Act 1966
- Status: Current legislation

The Therapeutic Goods Act 1989 is a piece of legislation passed by the Australian Parliament which aims to regulate therapeutic goods. The act is administered by the Therapeutic Goods Administration (TGA), which is part of the Commonwealth Department of Health. As of July 2025, the statutory framework set out in the act is mainly supplemented by the Therapeutic Goods Regulations 1990, the Therapeutic Goods (Medical Devices) Regulations 2002 and the Therapeutic Goods (Charges) Act 1990.

The central mechanism through which therapeutic goods (medicines, biologicals and medical devices) are regulated is the Australian Register of Therapeutic Goods (ARTG). Subject to the alternative supply and export pathways set out in the act, all therapeutic goods must be "registered" (for prescription medicines), "listed" (for complementary and over-the-counter medicines) or "included" (for biologicals and medical devices) in the ARTG to be lawfully supplied in Australia.

== History ==
In 2020, the TGA re-classified nicotine as a Schedule 4 substance under the Poisons Standard, meaning that consumers require a prescription from a medical prescription to obtain a nicotine vaping product. To date, there are no nicotine vaping products registered or included on the ARTG, so consumers must obtain these through the Authorised Prescriber (AP) Scheme, Special Access Scheme (SAS) B or Personal Importation Scheme pathways.
