= Ken Harvey (professor) =

Australian public health doctor

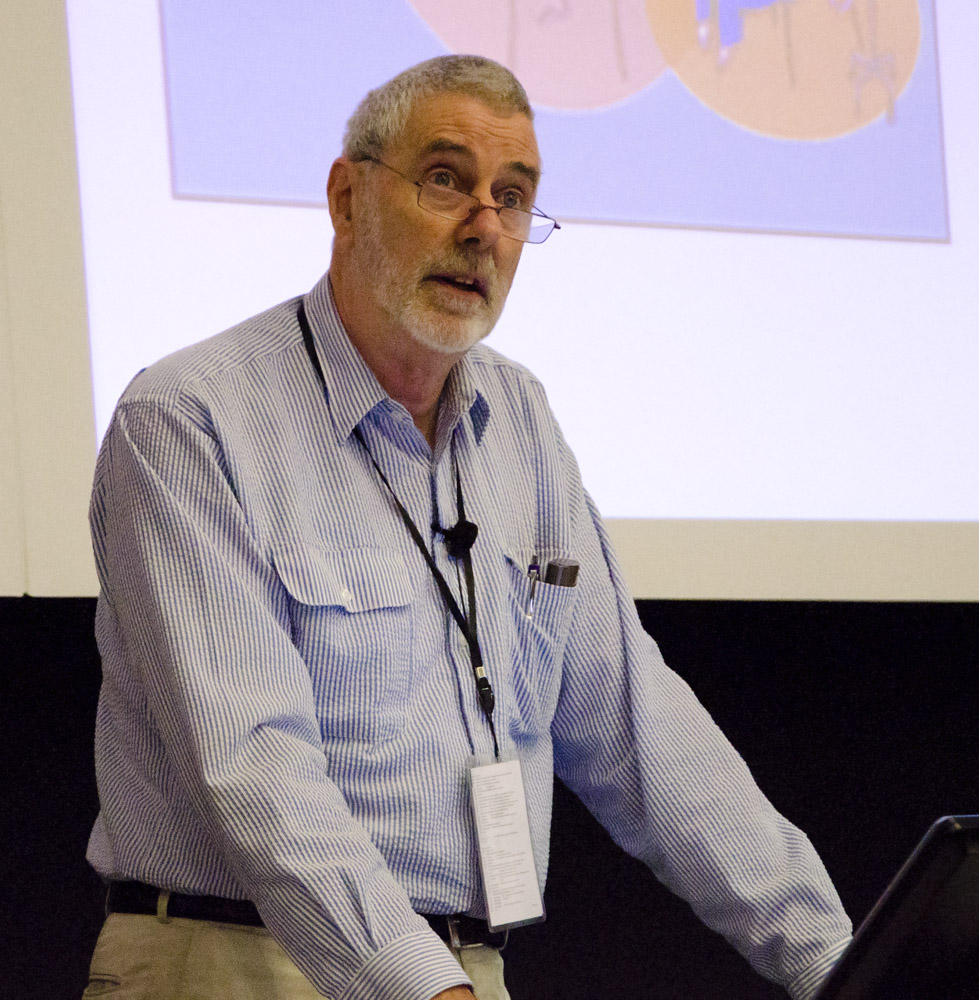
Ken Harvey speaking at the Australian Skeptics National Convention 2012

Kenneth John Harvey AM is an Australian public health doctor, currently Honorary Adjunct Associate Professor at the Institute for Evidence-Based Healthcare in Bond University. Described by The Age as an "anti-quackery crusader", Harvey is an advocate of evidence-based medicine and a critic of pharmaceutical marketing and unproven diet products. He is the president of Friends of Science in Medicine. In 2017, Harvey was awarded a Member of the Order of Australia (AM) for his "significant service to community health and the pharmaceutical industry”.

== Career ==
Harvey graduated in medicine from the University of Melbourne. He developed an interest in the factors that influence the prescribing of antibiotics, especially where it involved unethical promotion. He worked at the Royal Melbourne Hospital and then as an adjunct associate professor in the School of Public Health at La Trobe University.

Harvey took part in drawing up ethical criteria for the promotion of medicinal drugs for the World Health Organization, and served on a committee that formulated the Australian "Quality Use of Medicines" policy. He has also worked on medicinal drug policy in Southeast Asia, Croatia, and Jordan. He is Chair of the Governing Council of Health Action International Asia Pacific. He served on the TGA's Transparency Review Panel, the Medicines Australia Code Review Panel, the Working Group on Promotion of Therapeutic Products, and the Natural Therapy Review Advisory Committee. Another of his areas of interest is the application of information technology to optimise medicinal drug use.

Harvey quit his job with La Trobe in 2014 after the university agreed to receive $15 million from Swisse Wellness to fund a new complementary medicine centre. He told the Australian Journal of Pharmacy that "in 2013–4 Swisse sought a research partnership with a number of Australian universities; all but one resisted on the grounds that, while such an association might give Swisse a fig-leaf of respectability, it would not reflect well on the reputation of the university involved." This followed legal action by Swisse against the Australian Broadcasting Corporation for defamation in a consumer advocacy show The Checkout, which criticised their research methods.

In 2014 after leaving La Trobe, Harvey took a post as Adjunct Associate Professor of Epidemiology & Preventive Medicine at Monash University. Then in February 2021 he accepted an appointment as Honorary Adjunct Associate Professor in the Institute for Evidence-Based Healthcare at Bond University.

He also set up a private advocacy and consultancy company, "Medreach".

== Campaigning ==
Harvey is a critic of drug promotion by pharmaceutical companies, and supports a campaign called "No Advertising Please" that calls on doctors to reject free lunches from drug company representatives (who selectively present evidence that goes in a new drug's favour), and instead to only prescribe drugs that they have independently researched, including reading critical evaluations. Harvey served as a consumer representative on Medicines Australia's transparency working group, which advocated for patients to be able to know whether their doctors had been given free flights to industry-funded conferences that promote new drugs.

=== Therapeutic Goods Administration ===
Harvey has called on the Australian Therapeutic Goods Administration (TGA) "to ban inaccurate, misleading or unethical promotion of medicines", and is a strong critic of the way that therapeutic claims of complementary medicines are regulated. Harvey has criticised the TGA for not regulating body building products that contain synthetic amphetamines, which are instead regulated as food products despite making health claims. In 2016, he highlighted that Chemmart's consumer DNA testing was misleading and breached the TGA's Advertising Code because it was not able to deliver on the claims being made for it. Harvey had been appointed in 2018 by the federal Health Minister, Greg Hunt to represent the consumer organisation and magazine CHOICE on the advertising consultative committee of TGA, but in 2020, he resigned his position, citing a sense of frustration with the way the TGA upheld complaints against the promotion and sale of complementary medicines. He claimed that in 2018–19, the TGA did not issue sufficient penalties, in spite of having the power to do so. The TGA rejected this claim, noting the large number of fines handed out over dishonest advertisements during COVID-19, however, the Consumers Health Forum and CHOICE took Harvey's concerns very seriously.

=== Friends of Science in Medicine ===
In 2019, Harvey became the president of Friends of Science in Medicine (FSM). He replaced Professor John Dwyer AO, the founding president.

FSM, founded in 2011, is an organization which aims "to emphasise the importance of having health care in Australia based upon evidence, scientifically sound research and established scientific knowledge." It has grown to become a major critic of unscientific health practices and fraudulent health claims. It has advised governments and media, made numerous submissions to enquiries and provided extensive public advice concerning dubious health claims and practices. It successfully advocated the removal of private health insurance taxpayer-funded rebates from ‘natural’ therapies that lacked evidence of efficacy. FSM campaigns against the unethical promotion of therapeutic goods and services to consumers. Harvey originally joined the organization in 2016 and is a long-time executive member of FSM

=== Nurofen ===
Harvey criticised the Reckitt Benckiser brand Nurofen for marketing identical ibuprofen products in different packages as "targeting" specific pain, which became the subject of an Australian Competition & Consumer Commission (ACCC) investigation.

=== SensaSlim ===
Harvey was sued for alleged defamation by SensaSlim, a company that marketed products claimed to offer weight loss benefits, after he lodged a complaint about their practices with the Therapeutic Goods Administration. The company attempted to delete all correspondence with an Internet marketing company while under investigation by the ACCC.

The Federal Court determined that the company had engaged in deceptive conduct. The final result was that the company was fined a total of $3.55 million and was de-listed. Its principal, Peter Foster, was fined $660,000 and permanently banned from being a company director or having any business in the diet or health industry. Two other directors, Peter O'Brien and Michael Boyle were fined $55,000 and $75,000 respectively and disqualified from being company directors.

=== Medical Journal of Australia ===
In 2015, Stephen Leeder was sacked as the editor-in-chief of the Medical Journal of Australia after criticizing the decision to outsource production of the journal to the global publishing giant Elsevier. All but one of the AMJ's editorial advisory committee resigned following the decision to sack Leeder, and wrote to AMA president Brian Owler asking him to review the decision. Ken Harvey supported Leeder and said that his sacking, and the use of Elsevier is "a mistake that is fairly irredeemable"

=== Chiropractic ===
Harvey is very critical of the way that complaints against chiropractors have been handled by the Australian Health Practitioner Regulation Agency's (AHPRA) Chiropractic Board of Australia, regarding violations of its registration standards since the board's inception. The violations include "advertising in a misleading or deceptive manner," use of testimonials, and encouragement of "unnecessary use of health services." After a lack of resolution to these complaints, Harvey and the FSM approached the ACCC since they have "powers, under national consumer law, to prosecute for misleading and deceptive and unconscionable conduct" in the hopes that action would be taken to resolve the complaints.

In 2015, over a year after contacting the ACCC, Harvey and the FSM followed up on "ten representative complaints" to see if any action had been taken by either government body. Of those complaints, only one clinic resolved all of the issues while the others were still unresolved, including one clinic which had simply set up a new website containing the previous violations. It appeared that AHPRA had contacted the chiropractic clinics regarding the complaints, but they had not done very much to enforce their own rules. In response to this failure, Harvey and his colleagues contacted the press, including the AMJ and The Sydney Morning Herald, bringing a large amount of attention to the issue.

== Recognition ==
In 2011 he was awarded the Thornett Award for Promotion of Reason by the Australian Skeptics, and in 2013 they made him a life member.

The Australian consumer advocacy organisation Choice gave Harvey its "Consumer Champion" award in 2012, describing him as a "scam buster and snake oil nemesis", and they made Harvey a life member for his "services to the consumer movement".

In 2016, the Australian and New Zealand Association for the Advancement of Science chair Dr Malcolm Jenkins presented Harvey with their ANZAAS Medal, "in recognition of his longstanding advocacy for evidence-based medicine and treatment". The same year, he was awarded Skeptic of the Year by the Australian Skeptics "for continued and determined efforts which have made a significant impact on exposing malpractice in the chiropractic industry and its governing bodies".

Harvey was awarded a Member (AM) of the Order of Australia in the 2017 Queen's Birthday Honours list, to recognize his "significant service to community health and the pharmaceutical industry through roles in developing guidelines for the ethical use of antibiotics”.
