= Marcello Costa =

Australian medical researcher, academic, and public health advocate (1940 - 2024)

Marcello Costa AO
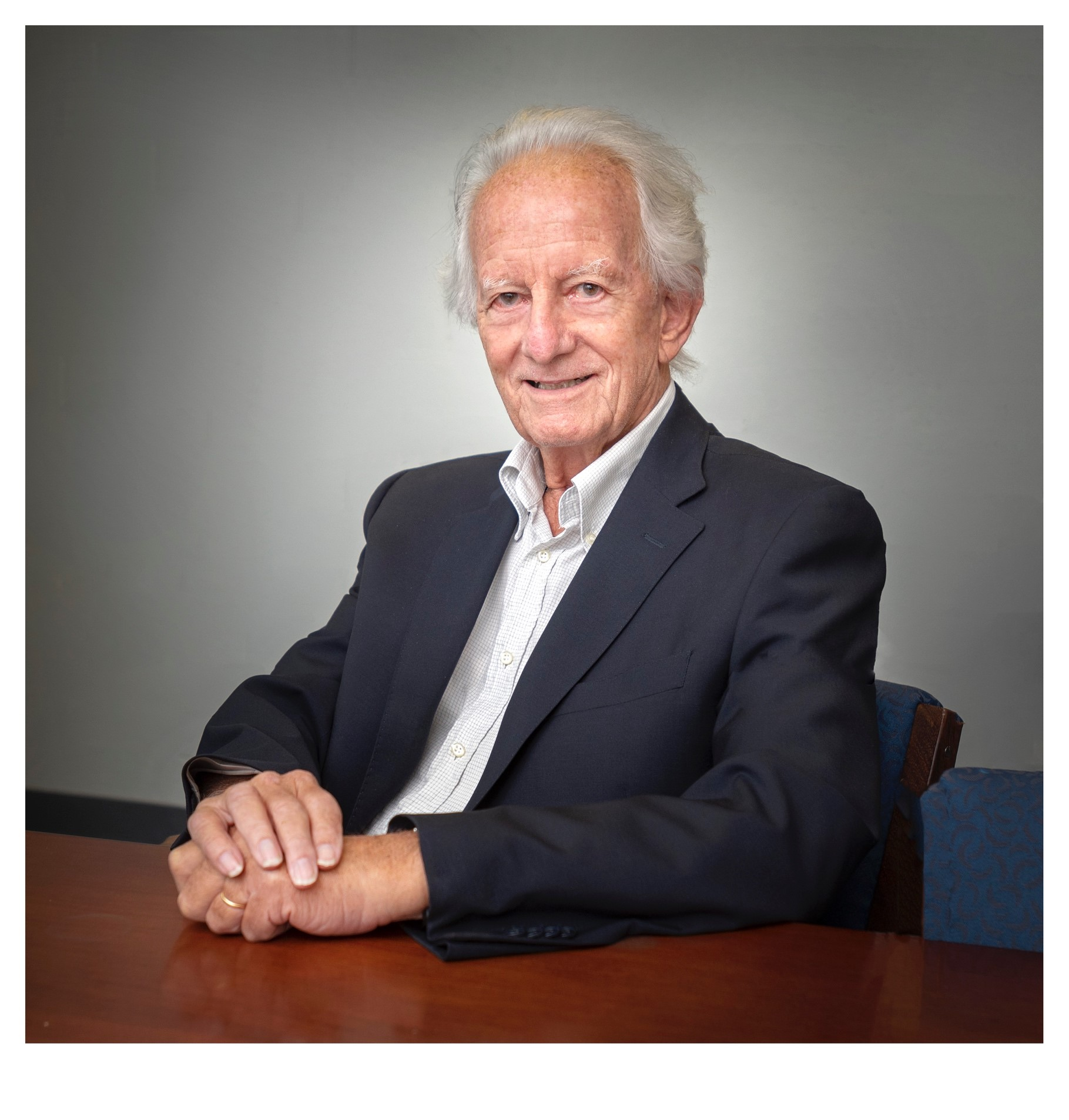
- Born: 9 January 1940; Turin, Italy
- Died: 14 April 2024 (aged 84); Adelaide, Australia
- Known for: Scientific basis of medicine
- Medical career
- Profession: Professor of Neurophysiology
- Field: Neurophysiology
- Institutions: Flinders University
- Research: role of neurons in controlling gut functions
- Website: flinders.edu.au/people/marcello.costa

Marcello Costa AO (9 January 1940 – 14 April 2024) was an Italian-born Australian medical researcher, academic, and public health advocate. He specialized in the structure and functions of the enteric nervous system. He taught in Turin, Melbourne, and Helsinki before moving to Adelaide in 1975 where he was a foundation lecturer at the Flinders Medical School, building the new discipline of neuroscience at the college. He worked at Flinders University, where he held the title of Matthew Flinders Distinguished Professor of Neurophysiology in the Department of Physiology from 2013 until his retirement in 2021.

He co-founded the Australian Neuroscience Society, the South Australian Neuroscience Institute (SANI) and the Friends of Science in Medicine (FSM). He was awarded the Australian Centenary Medal and the inaugural Lifetime Achievement Award by the Federation of Neurogastroenterology and Motility Societies, and in 2020 he was appointed as an Officer of the Order of Australia.

== Early life and education ==
Costa was born in Turin, Italy, on 9 January 1940. In 1949 his family migrated to Argentina, where he attended San Martin High School and then in 1954 entered the public Italian High School Cristoforo Colombo of Buenos Aires, finishing the Scientific Lyceum in 1960. In his youth, he was so intrigued by science that he even sold his bicycle to buy a microscope to study protozoa in ponds.

He studied as an intern in the University of Turin's Department of Anatomy and Histology, working as a researcher under the supervision of Giorgio Gabella. He was involved in a number of extracurricular activities, including acting as the editor of the university newspaper l'Ateneo. Although he was enrolled in anatomy, he also incorporated physiology despite resistance from the university to this multidisciplinary approach. He earned his degree in medicine (Laurea in Medicina e Chirurgia, equivalent to MB BS) from the University of Turin in 1967; his M.D. thesis was "The Adrenergic Innervation of the Alimentary Canal" with Dignita di Stampa (worthy of publication).

== Medical research career ==
"Our neurological systems link us to everything we do, shaping our thoughts, culture, intellectual capacity, emotions and our bodily functions. There is no area of science more important to understand, in my view."

— Marcello Costa,

Upon graduating in 1967, Costa completed compulsory military service as a medical officer, and then he began lecturing at the University of Turin. The following year, he became a Medical Registrar and general practitioner in Italy. In 1970, he and his newlywed wife Daniela migrated from Italy to Australia. Initially he worked as a Postdoctoral Fellow in zoology under Professor Geoffrey Burnstock at the University of Melbourne (1970–1973). In 1973, he also worked as a research fellow at the University of Helsinki in Finland, and then at the University of Turin.

In 1975, he moved back to Australia as a lecturer in Human Physiology at Flinders University. The discipline of Neuroscience was new at the time, and he became a foundation lecturer in the field at the Flinders Medical School (now called the College of Medicine and Public Health). In 1986 Flinders University recognized his service by creating a personal chair in Neurophysiology, and in 2013, he was appointed the Matthew Flinders Distinguished Professor in the College of Medicine and Public Health, and Professor of Neurophysiology.

His research focused on the nervous system, specifically how it interacts with the gut to control it, and he authored or co-authored more than 250 academic works on that subject, 72 review articles and book chapters, and four books. He also made what Flinders University describes as "a range of landmark discoveries about the role of neurons in driving the activity of the gut, and in recognising that a person's neurological system shapes their thoughts, culture, intellectual capacity, emotions and our bodily functions".

Costa's application of a systematic approach to new methods has made the neuronal structure of the enteric nervous system one of the best understood parts of the nervous system in mammals. Observations in this system have also guided the understanding of the function of neurons in the central nervous system. The studies he conducted into neuronal reflexes that enable intestinal motility and the neurotransmitters that are involved led to the discovery of excitatory and inhibitory neurotransmitters.

In 1983, Costa and John Furness organized the first meeting of the global leaders in the new field of enteric Neuroscience, which was held in Adelaide. In 2014, Costa collaborated with younger colleagues to organize a second such global symposium named "The enteric nervous system: 30 years later".

He was a founder of the Australian Neuroscience Society, and he served as its president in 1994–1995. In 2003 he founded the South Australian Neuroscience Institute (SANI) in association with Neuroscience colleagues and the SA Government, representing the three SA Universities; he served as its co-chair from 2003 to 2010.

== Community engagement ==
In addition to his formal academic roles, Costa promoted science-based medicine, philosophy of science and educating the general public, especially concerning neuroscience.

He was often called on by media to give expert commentary on a number of topics, including the evidence against acupuncture, universities which give credibility to pseudo-scientific topics including chiropractic, whether the free trade agreement between Australia and China should include "traditional Chinese medicine", proposals to register traditional Chinese medicine, and the "white light" reportedly seen by some dying people.

He also promoted awareness of the connections between science and humanities, especially in a project called "Science Outside the Square" where he teamed with Ian Gibbins, Professor of Anatomy at Flinders, playing keyboard while Costa sang and played the guitar. Their performances aimed to combine science, music, and art.

Costa jointly founded the "Friends of Science in Medicine" (FSM) in 2011, and he served as its treasurer until 2019. The University of Adelaide described FSM as "a public health watch dog group of distinguished lay members, scientists and health professionals who are concerned about honesty in medical claims and the need for evidence-based medicine particularly in the growing alternative therapy industry". He presented at the 2017 World Science Festival. He was a member of the Scientific Advisory Panel of the Australian Science Media Centre. He was a solo speaker at the Adelaide Festival of Ideas in July 2018, speaking on "A neuroscientist's view of homo sapiens and its world".

== Personal life ==
Costa married Daniela Tuffanelli in 1970. The couple has a son, Andrea, and three grandchildren.

He died in Adelaide on 14 April 2024.

== Awards and recognition ==
His awards and recognitions include:

- 1989: Fellow of the Australian Academy of Science
- 1992: "Cavaliere della Repubblica Italiana" from the Italian Government
- 1994: Piedmontese of the Year
- 1997: Honorary member of the Golden Key Honour Society
- 2001: Centenary Medal Australia
- 2004: Member of the Australian Academy of Brain Sciences
- 2006: Flinders 40th anniversary medal for services to the university
- 2008: "Unsung Hero of South Australian Science Communication" Award (jointly with Ian Gibbins)
- 2008: Life member of the Centre of Neuroscience at Flinders University
- 2010: Life membership of the ANS
- 2012: Matthew Flinders Distinguished Professor at Flinders University
- 2012: (jointly with the other founding members of Friends of Science in Medicine) – "Skeptics of the Year" by the Australian Skeptics Inc.
- 2014: Australasian Neuroscience Society medallion for "individuals who have provided outstanding service to the Society"
- 2015: Inducted as an Honorary Bragg Member of the Royal Institution of Australia (RIAus)
- 2018: Federation of Neurogastroenterology and Motility (FNM) Societies Lifetime Achievement Award in recognition of his research and mentorship, which have substantially influenced progress in the fields
- 2020: Officer of the Order of Australia (General Division) "for distinguished service to higher education, and to medical research, in the field of neurophysiology, and to professional scientific bodies."
- The Australasian Society for Autonomic Neuroscience presents a "Marcello Costa Excellence in Autonomic Neuroscience Award" to recognise excellence in autonomic neuroscience.

== Published books ==
- Brookes, Simon; Costa, Marcello, eds. (2002). Innervation of the gastrointestinal tract: Volume 14 of Autonomic nervous system. Taylor & Francis. ISBN 9780415283779.
- Burnstock, Geoffrey; Costa, Marcello (2013). Adrenergic neurons : their organization, function, and development in the peripheral nervous system. Chapman and Hall. ISBN 9781489972620.
- Costa, Marcello; et al. (2013). Sensory nerves and neuropeptides in gastroenterology: from basic science to clinical perspectives. Springer Science & Business Media. ISBN 9781489907448.
- Furness, John Barton; Costa, Marcello (2016). The Enteric Nervous System : 30 Years Later. Springer. ISBN 9783319275925.
