= Sue Ieraci =

Australian doctor and medical advocate (born 1960)

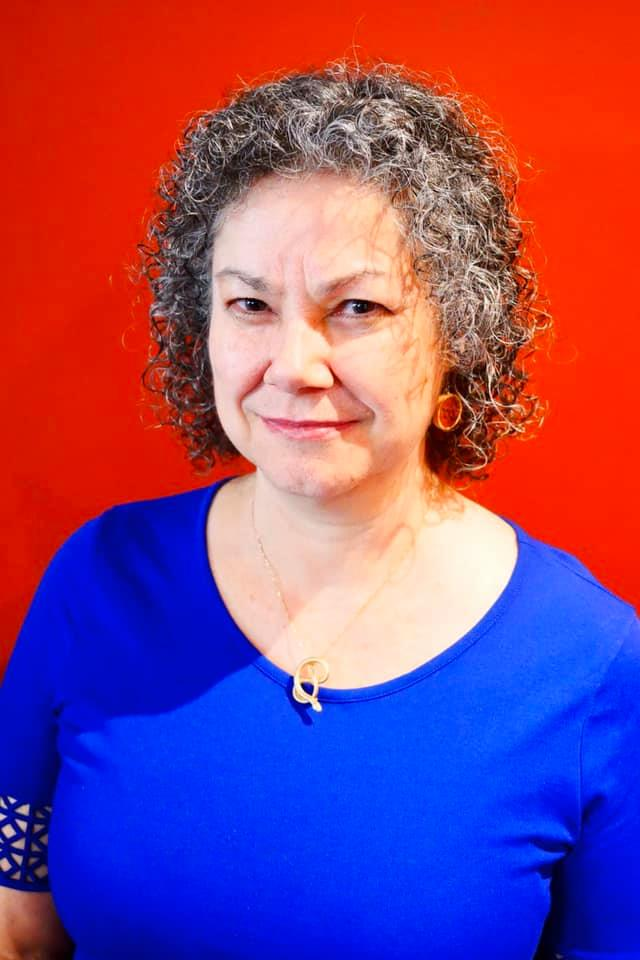
- Sue Ieraci in Dec 2019
- Born: 1960 (age 65–66); Sydney, Australia
- Education: MB, BS, Sydney University
- Occupation: Emergency physician
- Known for: Advocating for improvements in emergency medicine and supporting evidence-based medicine.

Sue Ieraci (born 1960) is an Australian doctor and emergency medicine specialist with more than three decades’ experience in the Australian public hospital system. She is a vocal advocate for improvements in emergency medicine, how it is viewed in the hospital framework and patient-centred care. Ieraci has been a member of the Executive of Friends of Science in Medicine and she strongly promotes evidence based medicine.

== Personal life ==
Ieraci was born in Sydney in 1960 to parents who were both immigrants from the Calabrese town of Roccella Ionica. Her first language was Calabrese but both she and her older sister began to speak only English in their early school years.

Ieraci is married with one daughter.

== Education ==
After matriculation she gained entrance to Medicine at Sydney University. She graduated in 1983, did an internship at St Vincent’s Hospital in Sydney then specialised in Emergency Medicine. She completed her EM training in Sydney in 1990.

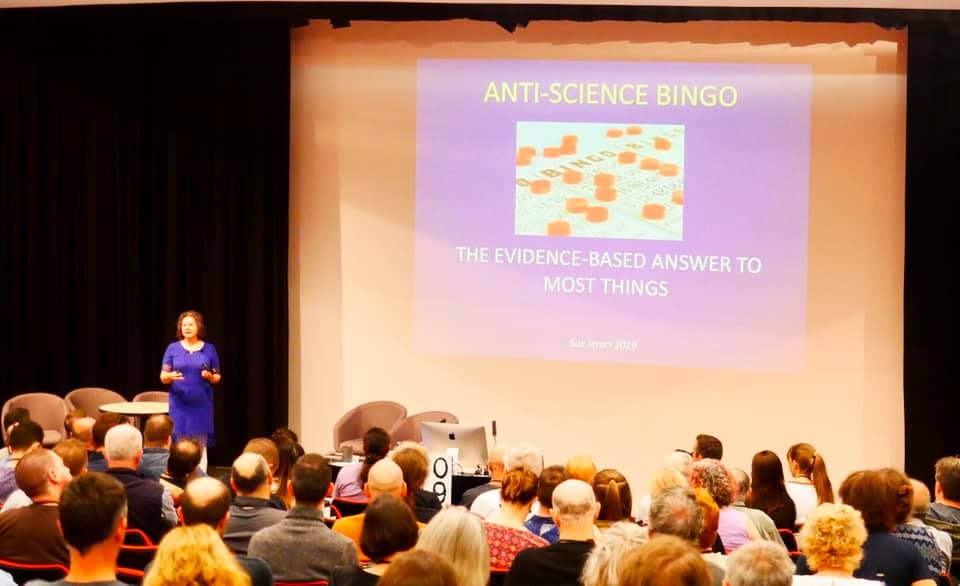
Skepticon 2019 - Sue Ieraci presenting "Medical anti-science bingo" lecture

== Career ==
Ieraci has spent a career of more than 35 years in public hospitals in the South West of Sydney which are working-class areas with lots of migrants. Her career has included periods of management, committees, policy development, medical regulation and health systems consultancy. Increasingly her focus is on human relationships within the health care system, but she has always maintained a clinical role. During her career she has spent 25 years as an emergency medicine specialist.

In 2010 - 2011 she sat on the NSW board of the Australian Health Practitioner Regulation Agency (AHPRA), and from 2010 - 2012 was the Ministerial appointee to the Medical Council of NSW. She now works in Emergency Telemedicine, providing care to a wide range of patients including people in remote areas and in nursing homes.

=== Significance in the national health debate ===
The Herald Sun has called Ieraci a "leading Australian doctor" and she has been called upon by the national media as a commentator on anti-vax topics, by newspapers and national radio to discuss hospital staffing crises, and by other media to give her opinion on alternative health influence. She has published more than 13 academic papers primarily dealing with issues facing Australian hospitals and ED's.

In 2007 she gave evidence to the NSW Government's Joint Select Committee on the Royal North Shore Hospital (The Nile Inquiry). In 2015, she appeared in front of a Federal Parliamentary Committee in her capacity as a medical practitioner in support of the Social Services Legislation Amendment (No Jab, No Pay) Bill 2015.

== Activism ==
Ieraci is a member of the Friends of Science in Medicine (FSM) Executive. She frequently speaks, writes, comments and is interviewed on issues around vaccination, alternative medicine and the wellness industry. In representing FSM she has been the target of criticism by groups opposing her views.

Ieraci appeared at the Federal Parliament Community Affairs Legislation Committee into the Federal No jab - No pay legislation. She has also spoken in the media warning the public against the Australian Vaccination-risks Network (AVN) and started an online petition to warn about the dangers of them.

=== Emergency medicine ===
Ieraci is vocal in supporting better processes and structures for emergency medicine. Her conference presentations have been greeted with applause and support, and she has been quoted on aspects of delivering best practice emergency medicine in both the press and in medical journals. At a meeting of the Australasian College for Emergency Medicine she spoke of the burden upon emergency departments due to the level of inexperience of a number of junior doctors.

She is involved with the Network of Women in Emergency Medicine (NoWEM) group which is "a community of Emergency Physicians celebrating and promoting the advancement of women in medicine in Australasia."

Ieraci has been involved with researching and problem solving around issues associated with integrating large eHealth IT systems. She is also currently working for better patient management in, and community expectations of, Australian emergency departments. Her publicly expressed opinions on emergency management issues have not been without criticism.

== Works ==
- Textbook of adult emergency medicine (contributor) - Churchill Livingstone Elsevier
- Emergency medicine : the principles of practice (contributor) - Churchill Livingstone
- Access block in NSW hospitals, 1999–2001: does the definition matter? - MJA
- Impact of a chest-pain guideline on clinical decision-making - MJA
- Redefining the physician's role in the era of online health information - MJA
- Good HIT and bad HIT - MJA
- EMERGENCY: Real stories from Australia’s ED doctor (contributor) - ACEM & Penguin
- Is there equity in emergency medical care? Waiting times and walk-outs in South Western Sydney hospital emergency departments - Australian Health Review
- 13 publications - Sue Ieraci's research while affiliated with Liverpool Hospital and other places.
