= Friends of Science in Medicine =

Australian association which supports science-based medicine

Friends of Science in Medicine Association
- Formation: 2011
- Type: professional association lobby group
- Headquarters: Morayfield, Queensland
- Location: Australia
- Members: 1000+
- Official language: English
- President: Assoc Prof Bruce Baer Arnold
- Key people: CEO Loretta Marron
- Website: https://www.scienceinmedicine.au

The Friends of Science In Medicine (FSM) is an Australian association which supports evidence-based medicine and strongly opposes the promotion and practice of unsubstantiated therapies that lack a scientifically plausible rationale. They accomplish this by publicly raising their concerns either through direct correspondence (E.g. the Australian government, universities, etc.) or through media outlets. FSM was established in December 2011 by Loretta Marron, John Dwyer, Alastair MacLennan, Rob Morrison and Marcello Costa, a group of Australian biomedical scientists and clinical academics.

== Scope and operations ==
Friends of Science in Medicine advocate the cessation of those university complementary medicine courses that are not based on scientific principles nor supported by scientific evidence, although they do support research into alternative and complementary approaches where there is evidence for potential benefit. By April 2012 they had widened their focus from university education to the clinical practice, use and legitimacy of complementary medicine within Australian society. Entirely volunteer run, FSM was initially supported by a A$3,000 grant from the Australian Skeptics Science and Education Foundation(ASSEF).

== Politics ==
Throughout its history, FSM has been actively involved in a variety of medical policy issues surrounding evidence-based medicine and complementary and alternative medicine. They continue to appeal to the Australian Health Practitioner Regulation Agency, Medicare (Australia) and Australian universities to review current policies.

FSM entered into the Australian media and promoted their message through The Sydney Morning Herald, The Courier-Mail the Australian Broadcasting Corporation, The Conversation, The Medical Journal of Australia, the Australian Doctor magazine and regional radio stations. By May 2012 thirteen separate FSM discursive events created the unified message that all alternative and complementary medicines should be banned unless proven by rigorous scientific inquiry.

In September 2012 FSM was involved in lobbying the Australian Health Minister, Tanya Plibersek, to expand the chief medical officer's study into complementary medicine to include chiropractic and acupuncture. The group further demanded that all alternative medicines be taken off private health insurance which the Australian Government subsidizes. The Australian Government is currently examining the evidence of clinical efficacy, cost effectiveness, safety and quality of natural therapies. The result, expected in April 2015, will include a decision as to which natural therapies should continue to receive the rebate. The therapies under review are those not provided by an accredited health professional, which are covered by private health insurance but not Medicare. In addition to homeopathy, they include iridology, aromatherapy, various kinds of massage, Buteyko, yoga and pilates.

== Criticisms ==
Critics complained in various opinion pieces that the group had "taken its tactics too far." The group underwent further criticism through editorials in The Medical Journal of Australia calling on the association to reverse its tactics.

Kerryn Phelps, former President of the Australian Medical Association, wrote the group had "cast its net too wide" in its condemnations, particularly in attacking courses in chiropractic, traditional Chinese medicine and Western herbalism. She further stated, "there is evidence supporting CAM approaches. You also have to remember that a sizable part of what is done in mainstream medicine lacks robust evidence."

Phelps, along with Stephen Myers, a Professor of Complementary Medicine and Director of the Natural Medicine Research Unit at Southern Cross University, in a 2012 editorial in The Medical Journal of Australia wrote, "there is great danger for the public if complementary medicine practice is allowed to develop outside mainstream education." They wrote it would undermine "safe practice and critical appraisal", and stated there is now an extensive evidence base for complementary therapies available.

In an open letter on their website which was triggered by FSM's position on the proposed partnership between nutraceutical company Swisse and La Trobe University, the Australasian Integrative Medicine Association (AIMA) criticizes the FSM for not contacting AIMA or other complementary medicine organizations which, the AIMA states, would at least establish "a more effective dialogue ... to improve the basis of health care and research for academics, medical professionals and the general population alike." They further state that "FSM appear to be purposefully limiting their use of scientific scrutiny."

== Activities and impact ==
The following describes some of the initiatives and accomplishments of the Friends of Science in Medicine.

=== Acupuncture ===
WHO listed 160 diseases/problems thought to respond to acupuncture treatments, although no well performed studies prove that acupuncture can cure or alter the specified pathologies. FSM successfully approached WHO who retracted the recommendations adding instead plans for further study. FSM also raised its concerns regarding what they consider to be unethical promotion of acupuncture with Australian Health Practitioner Regulation Agency (AHPRA) executives and the AHPRA Chinese Medicine board, but they were unsuccessful at achieving a change.

=== Chiropractic ===
As a result of the efforts of John Dwyer and the Friends of Science in Medicine, in August 2013, the chairman of the Chiropractic Board of Australia said it had removed some courses from its approved training schedule and would be randomly auditing practitioners to ensure they were not making unsubstantiated claims about the benefits of chiropractic. It also announced all registered chiropractors would be required to remove anti-vaccination claims from their websites.

In April 2013, Macquarie University began discussions with higher education providers to transfer its chiropractic degrees by 2015. Executive Dean of Science, Professor Clive Baldock said the initiative was first and foremost an academic one, based on a need for the Faculty of Science to build upon the University's recent major strategic investments in research-intensive disciplines such as biomedical science and engineering.

Earlier in 2013, FSM sent out a series of letters about inappropriate treatment of babies and children by chiropractors who claim that spinal manipulation helps health conditions such as Attention deficit hyperactivity disorder, Asthma, allergies, bedwetting, colic and ear infection and is a substitute for vaccination. This was prompted in part by the report that government funding of chiropractic care for children under 14 was reported to have risen by 185% in four years. FSM sent letters to the Chiropractic and Osteopathic College of Australasia (COCA), Chiropractors' Association of Australia (CAA), Chiropractic Board of Australia (CBA), the Australian Spinal Research Foundation (ASRF), Chiropractic Council of NSW and Council on Chiropractic Education Australasia (CCEA). A second letter sent to the four universities teaching chiropractic, asking them to justify the 'subluxation' theory that is the foundation of chiropractic. The response by the CEO of Chiropractors' Association of Australia, Andrew Macnamara claims that there is no evidence provided to back up the concerns that chiropractic subluxations are an unjustified hypothesis, however there is evidence from a 2007 systematic review published in Pediatrics and a 2009 report by four chiropractors which would back up FSM concerns that subluxations are not causally related to disease and thus have no valid clinical applicability.

In March 2014, surgeon John Cunningham and FSM's Joanne Benhamu published an article in The Medical Journal of Australia calling for a national system for chiropractors to report adverse events in the wake of allegations that a four-month-old baby had a neck fracture following treatment for torticollis. The Chiropractors' Association of Australia responded by saying that it was in favor of a mandatory adverse reporting system but that it should apply to all health professions and be run through Australian Health Practitioners Regulation Agency (AHPRA).

As of 2017, FSM has reported over 1200 chiropractors to APHRA for promoting treatments that FSM considers dangerous and not evidence based. FSM has also called on the Australian Government to ban chiropractors from treating children younger than eight years old.

=== Homeopathy ===
In systematic reviews of randomised controlled trials, Cochrane Researchers examine recent evidence for the safety and effectiveness of therapies. Edzard Ernst conducted a systematic review of reviews in The Cochrane Database of Systematic Reviews (generally considered to be the most reliable source of evidence) in January 2010. Ernst's review, published in The Medical Journal of Australia, concluded, "The findings of currently available Cochrane reviews of studies of homeopathy do not show that homeopathic medicines have effects beyond placebo."

Commenting in an article in The Guardian on a National Health and Medical Research Council (NHMRC) study (draft) debunking homeopathy, FSM co-founder John Dwyer stressed an area that was not investigated; the use of homeopathy for protection. Dwyer told The Guardian, "the most serious issue was the spreading of the concept that homeopathic vaccinations were harmless and just as good as orthodox vaccinations. People who believe that are not protecting themselves and their children."

=== La Trobe University/Swisse Wellness partnership controversy ===
In January 2014, La Trobe University formed a A$15M partnership with vitamin manufacturer Swisse Wellness, causing a wave of controversy in the Australian medical community. One month later, Ken Harvey, Adjunct Associate Professor at the School of Public Health at La Trobe, resigned his position, stating "here were clear dangers in conducting research that was paid for by companies, and he could no longer be associated with the university given the 'fraught way' the research was being undertaken."

In light of this controversy, FSM wrote to the Australian Government's NHMRC, urging them to "generate formal guidelines for research funding that would reflect the 'world's best practices,' as this is needed to protect the credibility and integrity of contracted research, particularly where the results could affect the pecuniary interests of the funder." As a result, the NHMRC is reviewing the evidence for the effectiveness of homeopathy and released a resource for clinicians entitled "Talking with your patients about Complementary Medicine – a Resource for Clinicians."

=== Nursing and midwifery ===
FSM expressed concern after the Australian College of Midwives (ACM) endorsed the training of nurses in a range of alternative therapies, such as moxibustion for turning breech babies, as part of nurses' professional development requirements. Alastair MacLennan of FSM argued that such therapies are "dark arts" that do not have a scientific basis. In response, the ACM defended these courses, arguing that "it is essential that midwives have an understanding of practices that women are interested in, including complementary therapies", and that they believe "that all health professionals, including midwives, have the critical thinking skills to enable them to suitably analyse and assess any practice or research to determine whether it can be incorporated into their evidence-based practice". However, Sue Ieraci, an executive member of FSM, noted that these courses do not review the evidence in favour of these therapies, but rather teach participants how to administer the therapy.

=== Osteopathy ===
FSM raised concerns with AHPRA's Osteopathy Board regarding the advertisement of osteopathy of the cranial field (OCF) and visceral manipulation; techniques that they consider objectionable. Although the Osteopathy Board agreed to state in their advertising that OCF is not backed up by scientific evidence, this did not occur.

=== Therapeutic goods ===
FSM has urged the Therapeutic Goods Administration (TGA) to improve its regulation of the advertising of therapeutic goods, arguing that the advertisement of unproven or disproven complementary medicines and medical devices is dangerous and could potentially harm consumers or delay their use of effective treatments. FSM found that few product claims are actually audited by the TGA and that scientific evidence was absent for these claims in the majority of cases. FSM have also expressed disappointment in what they consider to be a lack of transparency in the TGA's system of handling complaints. FSM also lobbied the TGA regarding advertising relating to products such “bioresonance” devices, which were subsequently the target of a TGA crackdown due to a lack of scientific credibility of these devices.

== Awards ==
Loretta Marron, CEO of FSM, was awarded a 2014 Medal (OAM) in the General Division of the Order of Australia "for service to community health". Marron has also received the Skeptic of the Year award three times from the Australian Skeptics who wrote she "has made great contributions to public health and the exposure of dangerous and discredited treatments that profit through offering spurious cures to the vulnerable and ill."

== See also ==
- Rob Morrison (scientist)
- Marcello Costa
- Alastair MacLennan (obstetrician)
- Ken Harvey (professor)
- Loretta Marron
- John Dwyer (medicine)
- Sue Ieraci
- Australian Skeptics
