= Therapeutic Goods Administration =

Medicine and therapeutic regulatory agency of the Australian Government

Agency overview
- Formed: 1963 (Therapeutic Substances Section); 1974 (Therapeutics Division); 1989 (Therapeutic Goods Administration)
- Jurisdiction: Australian Government
- Employees: 750 (2016)
- Annual budget: A$170 million (2020–21)
- Agency executive: Professor Tony Lawler, Deputy Secretary, Health Products Regulation Group
- Parent department: Department of Health, Disability and Ageing
- Website: tga.gov.au

The Therapeutic Goods Administration (TGA) is the medicine and therapeutic regulatory agency of the Australian Government. As part of the Department of Health, Disability and Ageing, the TGA regulates the safety, quality, efficacy and advertising in Australia of therapeutic goods (which comprise medicines, medical devices, biologicals and certain other therapeutic goods). Therapeutic goods include goods that are represented to have a therapeutic effect, are included in a class of goods the sole or principal use of which is (or ordinarily is) a therapeutic use, or are otherwise determined to be a therapeutic good through a legislative instrument under the Therapeutic Goods Act 1989. Goods that are therapeutic goods must be entered on the Australian Register of Therapeutic Goods (ARTG), or otherwise be the subject of an exemption, approval or authority by the TGA under the Therapeutic Goods Act 1989, Therapeutic Goods Regulations 1990 or Therapeutic Goods (Medical Devices) Regulations 2002 before they can be imported, supplied, exported or manufactured in Australia.

== History ==
=== Early years ===
Regulation of therapeutic goods in Australia was initially undertaken at a state level, with regular conferences held between state and federal governments aimed at achieving uniform standards for drugs. Although federal legislation was sought from an early period, there was considerable uncertainty as to the extent of the federal parliament's ability to legislate in that area. Commonwealth Serum Laboratories was created by the federal government in 1916 and in 1932 was nominated as the local repository for biological standards set by the League of Nations.

The first federal legislation relating to therapeutic goods was the Lyons government's Therapeutic Substances Act 1937, which gave the federal Minister for Health the power to regulate the import and export of therapeutic goods and bring Australian standards into line with League of Nations standards. The act was amended in 1938 to better define which substances were therapeutic. Ultimately the provisions of the legislation was never brought into effect due to changes of government and the onset of World War II. The National Health and Medical Research Council (NHMRC) took a more active role in co-ordinating regulation during war time, including uniformity of labelling, medical nomenclature, and dangerous drugs legislation.

=== First federal legislation ===
In 1952, following lobbying from the NHMRC, the federal government organised a Therapeutic Substances Conference attended by representatives of federal and state governments. The conference passed a series of resolutions calling on major changes to therapeutic goods regulation in Australia, including national legislation for drug purity standards, uniform state legislation for drug manufacture, marketing and labelling, and the establishment of a national standards laboratory for testing new drugs. It has been suggested the increased focus on national standards was prompted by concerns that the Pharmaceutical Benefits Scheme (PBS) was allowing for government subsidy of sub-standard medicines.

The Menzies government's Therapeutic Substances Act 1953, passed in the wake of the National Health Act 1953, was the first effective federal therapeutic goods legislation and allowed for federal control over drug imports, drug sold to the federal government, drugs subject to interstate trade, and drugs supplied under the PBS. The new act allowed for the replacement of the British Pharmacopoeia (BP) as the primary source of quality standards for drugs in Australia, following concerns that the BP had not kept up to date with new medications. In introducing the legislation, federal health minister Earle Page – a former surgeon – referred to the existing poor standard of drug quality in Australia and stated it "would be criminal to allow such a state of affairs to exist and continue merely through lack of appropriate action".

In 1956, regulations under the 1953 act established the Therapeutic Substances Advisory Committee, the Biological Standards Committee, and the Therapeutic Substances Standards Committee to advise the Minister for Health on drug regulations. The National Biological Standards Laboratory (NBSL) was created in 1958 to test the quality of imported drugs and drugs to be supplied under the PBS. One notable absence from the 1953 legislation was the lack of any penalty for possessing or dealing with a sub-standard therapeutic substance.

=== Regulatory expansion ===
The Thalidomide scandal of the early 1960s prompted a reconsideration of federal regulation of drugs. In 1963, the Australian Drug Evaluation Committee was formed to consider legislative reforms and expressed its "grave concern at the continuing lack of adequate statutory control over the importation of new therapeutic substances". The committee's lobbying resulted in the Therapeutic Goods Act 1966, which significantly expanded the Minister for Health's powers in that area. However, regulations under the 1966 act were not proclaimed until 1970, amid significant criticism that the act gave the minister too much power and reduced parliamentary oversight. The new legislation also failed to resolve the issue of uniform state regulations.

A separate Therapeutic Substances Section was created in the Department of Health in 1963, under the Division of National Health, with regulations having previously been overseen by the director of the NBSL. The National Therapeutic Goods Committee was established in 1971 and in 1974 the Department of Health was restructured to create a separate Therapeutics Division in place of the Therapeutic Substances Section. The NBSL was merged into the Therapeutics Division in 1985. In 1981, the Fraser government's Health Acts Amendment Bill 1981 significantly broadened the scope of the Therapeutic Goods Act 1966 to include a wide range of medical devices, update standards and monitoring of manufacturing and testing, established a new National Register of Therapeutic Goods, and increase penalties for contraventions of the act.

=== Modern act ===
Following a series of government and parliamentary inquiries in the 1980s, the Hawke government's Therapeutic Goods Act 1989 came into effect in 1991, repealing the preceding 1966 act. The effect of the new legislation was to establish a comprehensive national framework for therapeutic goods, including a mandatory Australian Register of Therapeutic Goods. The existing Therapeutics Division within the Department of Health was reorganised and replaced by the Therapeutic Goods Administration (TGA). Some functions of the NHMRC were transferred to the TGA later in the 1990s.

== Structure of the TGA and medical regulation in Australia ==
In Australia, medical products are regulated by the TGA and, for controlled drugs such as cannabis, by the Office of Drug Control (ODC). Together, the TGA and ODC form the Health Products Regulation Group within the Department of Health and Aged Care. The Health Products Regulation Group comprises 14 regulatory branches and one legal branch, organised into four divisions.

Structure of the Health Products Regulation Group (August 2024)
Division name	Branch name	Head
Regulatory Legal Services	Regulatory Legal Services	Dr Bridget Gilmour-Wals
Medicines Regulation	Prescription Medicines Authorisation	Andrew Simpson
Medicines Regulation	Complementary and Over-the-counter Medicines	Dr Cheryl McRae
Medicines Regulation	Scientific Evaluation	Dr George Vukovic
Medicines Regulation	Pharmacovigilance	Dr Claire Larter A/g
Medicines Regulation	International Regulatory	Dr Michael Wiseman
Medical Devices and Product Quality	Medical Devices Authorisation	John Jamieson
Medical Devices and Product Quality	Medical Devices Surveillance	Dr Marcelle Noja
Medical Devices and Product Quality	Laboratories	Dr Lisa Ker
Medical Devices and Product Quality	Manufacturing Quality	Jennifer Burnett
Regulatory Practice and Support	Office of Drug Control (Note: The ODC is entirely under the Office of Drug Control branch within the Health Products Regulation Group.)	Avi Rebera
Regulatory Practice and Support	Digital Transformation	Terri Dreyer
Regulatory Practice and Support	Vaping Implementation and Enforcement Branch	Nicole McLay
Regulatory Practice and Support	Regulatory Compliance	Tracey Lutton A/g
Regulatory Practice and Support	Regulatory Engagement	Sarah Syme

The TGA also includes seven specialised statutory committees, which the agency can call upon for assistance on technical or scientific issues. Four other committees also exist to give guidance on annual influenza vaccines, industry consultation matters, and the Therapeutic Goods Advertising Code.

== Proposed regulation agency with New Zealand ==
In September 2003, the Australian and New Zealand Government signed a treaty to establish a common therapeutic regulatory agency for the two countries. Australia New Zealand Therapeutic Products Agency, as it was to be called, would replace the TGA and Medsafe, the national regulator in New Zealand. In June 2011, eight years after the original treaty, Australian Prime Minister Julia Gillard and New Zealand Prime Minister John Key signed a letter of intent, reaffirming plans to create such an agency.

In November 2014, both Australia and New Zealand agreed to cease plans to create a shared regulator, citing "a comprehensive review of progress and assessment of the costs and benefits to each country". The joint statement announcing the cessation outlines that both the TGA and Medsafe would continue to cooperate on medicine regulation and that the New Zealand Government would still participate in the now defunct, Council of Australian Governments Health Council.

== COVID-19 vaccine approval and distribution ==
=== Pfizer–BioNTech vaccine ===
Wordmark of the Australian Government's COVID-19 vaccination program.

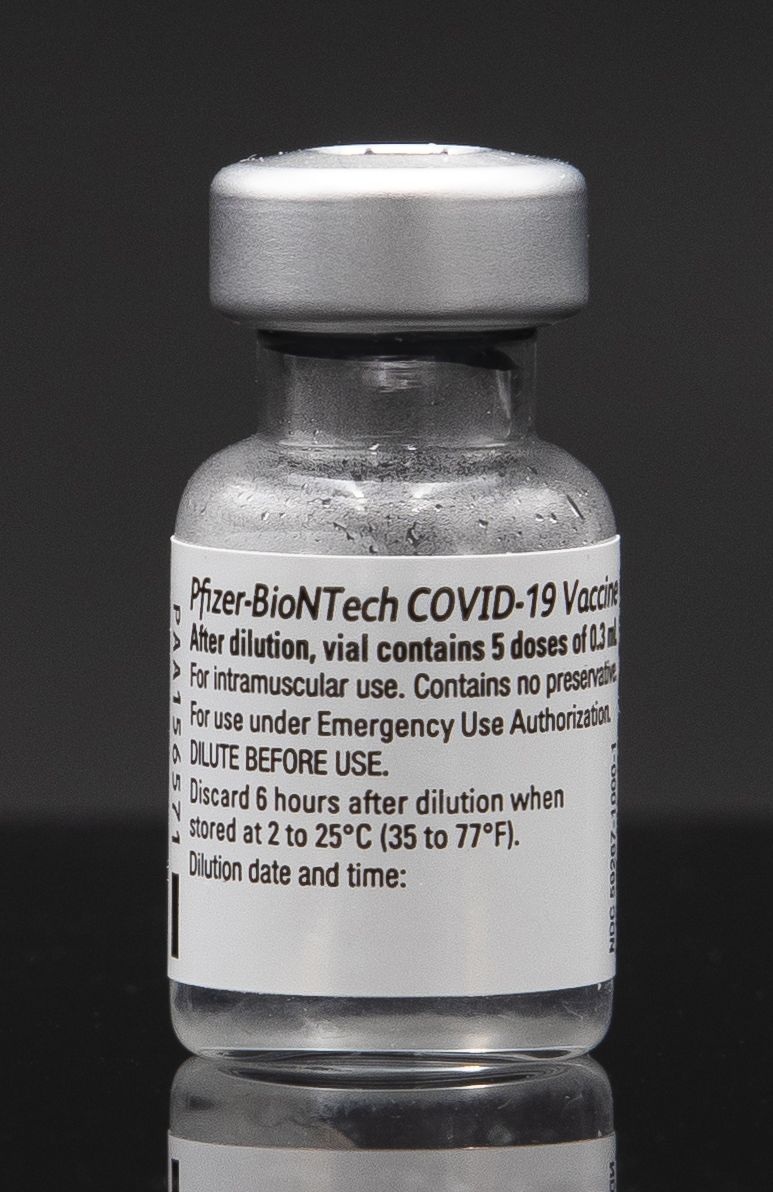
Pfizer–BioNTech vaccine (2021)

On 25 January 2021, the TGA provisionally approved the two-dose Pfizer–BioNTech COVID-19 vaccine, named COMIRNATY, for use within Australia. The provisional approval only recommends the vaccine for patients over the age of 16, pending ongoing submission of clinical data from the vaccine sponsors (the manufacturers, Pfizer and BioNTech). Additionally, every batch of vaccines have their composition and documentation verified by TGA laboratories before being distributed to medical providers.

The Department of Health and Aged Care planned the administration of COVID-19 vaccinations in five phases, organised by the risk of exposure. Border, quarantine, and front-line health and aged care workers were vaccinated first, followed by over 70 year-olds, other health care workers, and essential emergency service members. Following the provisional approval of COMIRNATY, Prime Minister Scott Morrison said that it was planned for the first group to begin vaccinations by February 2021, six weeks earlier than originally planned.

The first public COVID-19 vaccination in Australia actually took place on 21 February 2021 with the Pfizer–BioNTech vaccine at Castle Hill in Sydney. An 84-year-old aged care resident was the first Australian to receive the vaccine. To show confidence in the national immunisation vaccine rollout, Prime Minister Morrison and Chief Medical Officer Professor Paul Kelly also received vaccinations.

On 23 February 2021, Australia's second shipment of the Pfizer vaccine arrived at Sydney airport. Health Minister Hunt confirmed the arrival of 166,000 doses, and 120,000 more doses expected to arrive in the following week.

On 9 April 2021, Prime Minister Morrison announced that Australia had secured another 20 million doses of Pfizer vaccine on top of 20 million already on order, meaning 40 million doses should be available to Australians in 2021. This was amid concerns about the AstraZeneca vaccine, in rare cases, causing blood clots; see section Oxford–AstraZeneca vaccine below. The additional doses of Pfizer were expected to arrive in Australia in the last quarter of 2021.

On 23 July 2021, the TGA approved the Pfizer COVID-19 vaccine for teenagers between 12 and 15 years old.

On 5 December 2021, the TGA provisionally approved the Pfizer COVID-19 vaccine access for five to 11-year-olds.

=== Oxford–AstraZeneca vaccine ===
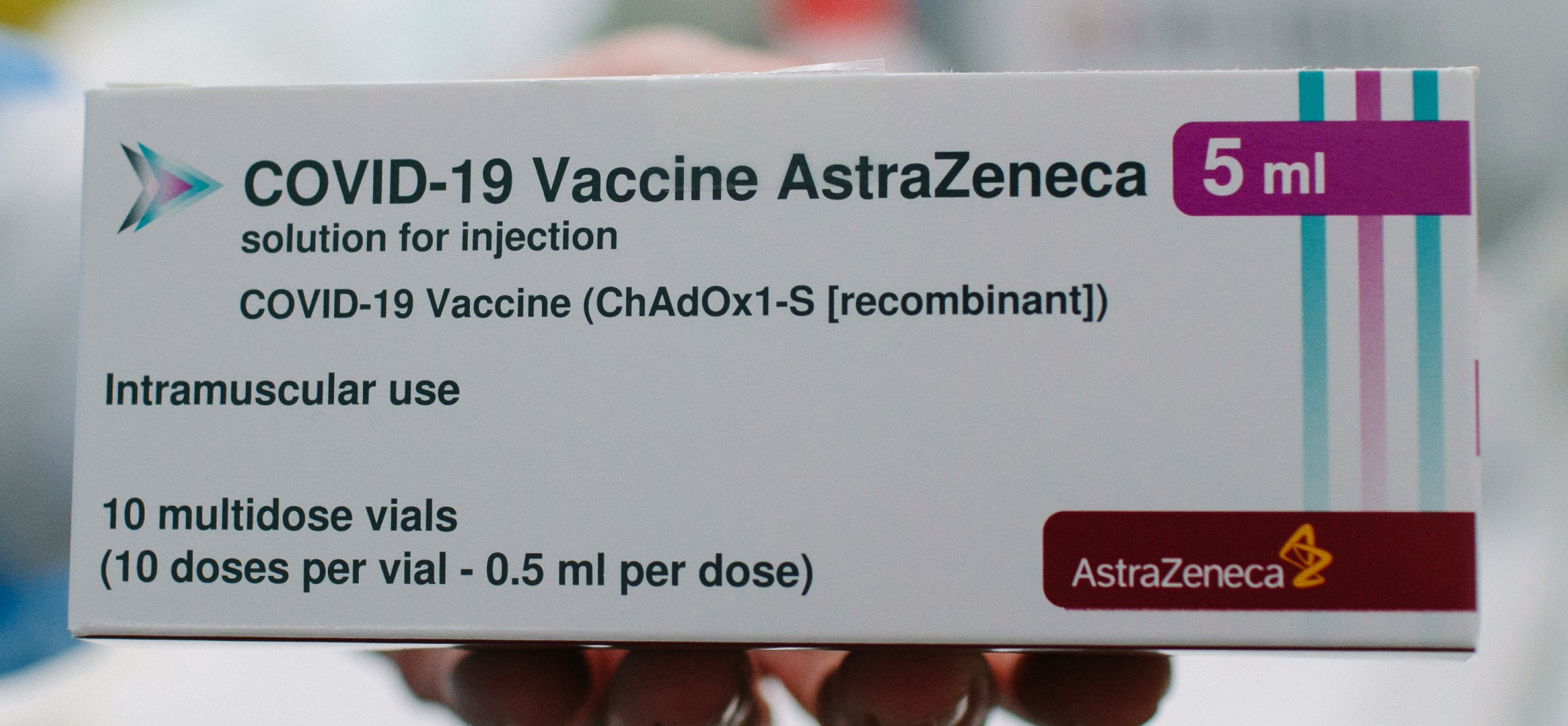
Oxford AstraZeneca COVID-19 vaccine (2021)

On 16 February 2021, the Oxford–AstraZeneca vaccine was approved by the TGA for use in Australia. The administration of this vaccine was scheduled to start in March. Two weeks later, on 28 February, the first shipment of the vaccine, around 300,000 doses, arrived at Sydney for rollout from 8 March. On 5 March 2021, Italy stopped the export of AstraZeneca vaccine to Australia due to their slower rollout of that vaccine in the EU. On 23 March, TGA approved the first batch of locally manufactured AstraZeneca vaccine by CSL-Seqirus in Melbourne, and 832,200 doses were ready for rollout in the following weeks.

On 17 June 2021, Federal Health minister Greg Hunt announced a rise in the age limit for administration of the AstraZeneca vaccine. After new advice from the Australian Technical Advisory Group on Immunisation (ATAGI), the vaccine was no longer recommended for people aged under 60 years. This advice came after new cases of blood clotting, thrombosis with thrombocytopenia syndrome (TTS), in those under 60 after AstraZeneca vaccinations.

On 23 June 2021, the Federal government released vaccine allocation projections and forecast that the Oxford-AstraZeneca vaccine would be in "little need" past October 2021 when all Australians over 60 years were expected to be fully vaccinated.

On 9 February 2022 within Australia the Oxford-AstraZeneca vaccine was approved by the TGA (still pending ATAGI approval) as booster vaccines for individuals – joining Pfizer and Moderna booster vaccines for individuals approved months ago.

=== Janssen COVID-19 vaccine ===
On 25 June 2021, provisional approval was given by the TGA to the Janssen COVID-19 vaccine, the third vaccine for potential use in Australia. Strict conditions were imposed on Janssen which includes further investigation documents related to the efficacy, long term effects and safety concerns that must be provided regularly to TGA. It is still not included in the vaccination programme.

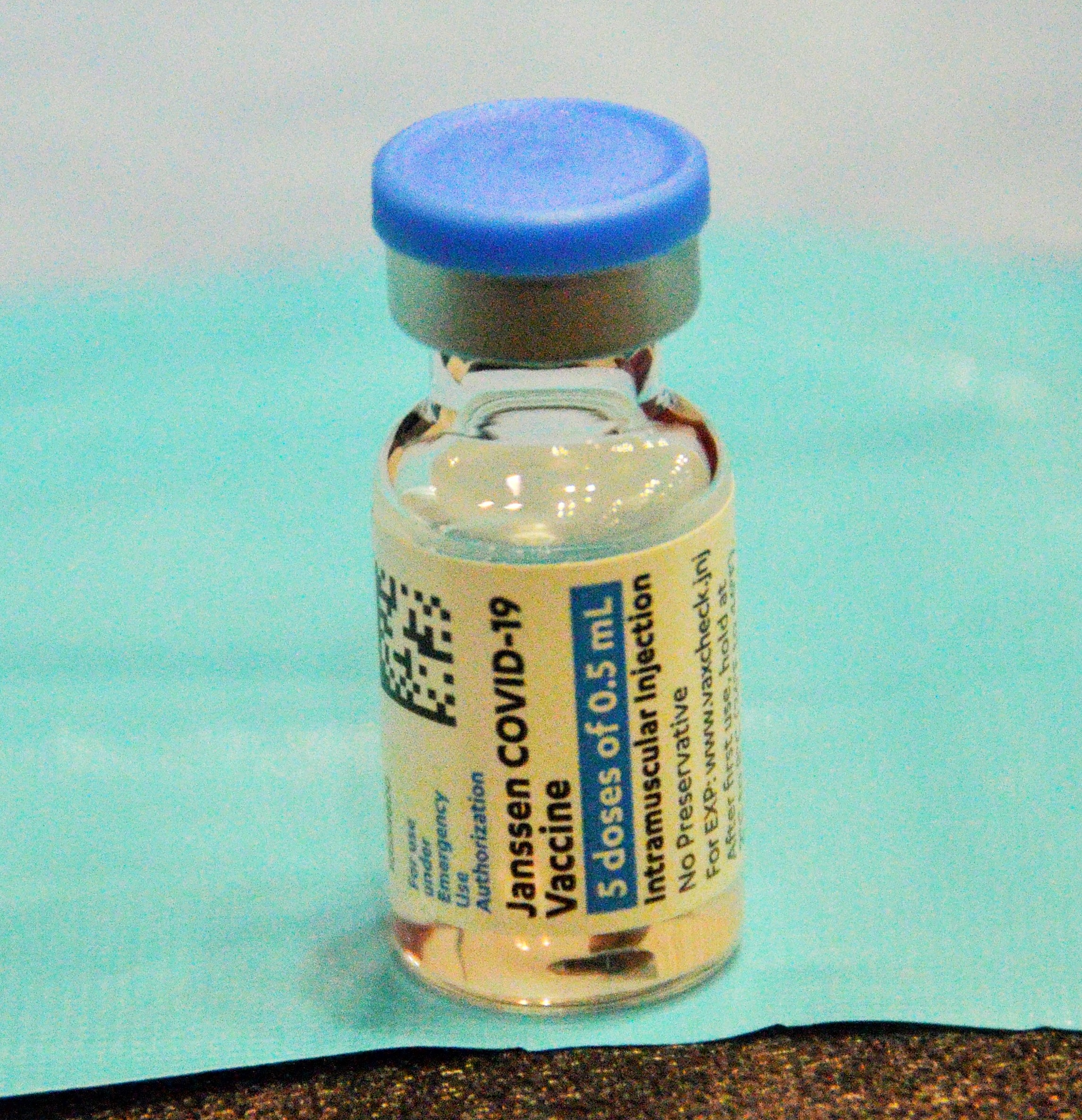
Johnson & Johnson COVID-19 vaccine developed by Janssen

== See also ==
- Medsafe, New Zealand's health regulation agency
- International Council for Harmonisation of Technical Requirements for Pharmaceuticals for Human Use
- Standard for the Uniform Scheduling of Medicines and Poisons
- COVID-19 vaccination in Australia
