= Barbara O'Neill =

Banned Australian alternative medicine promoter

Barbara O’Neill
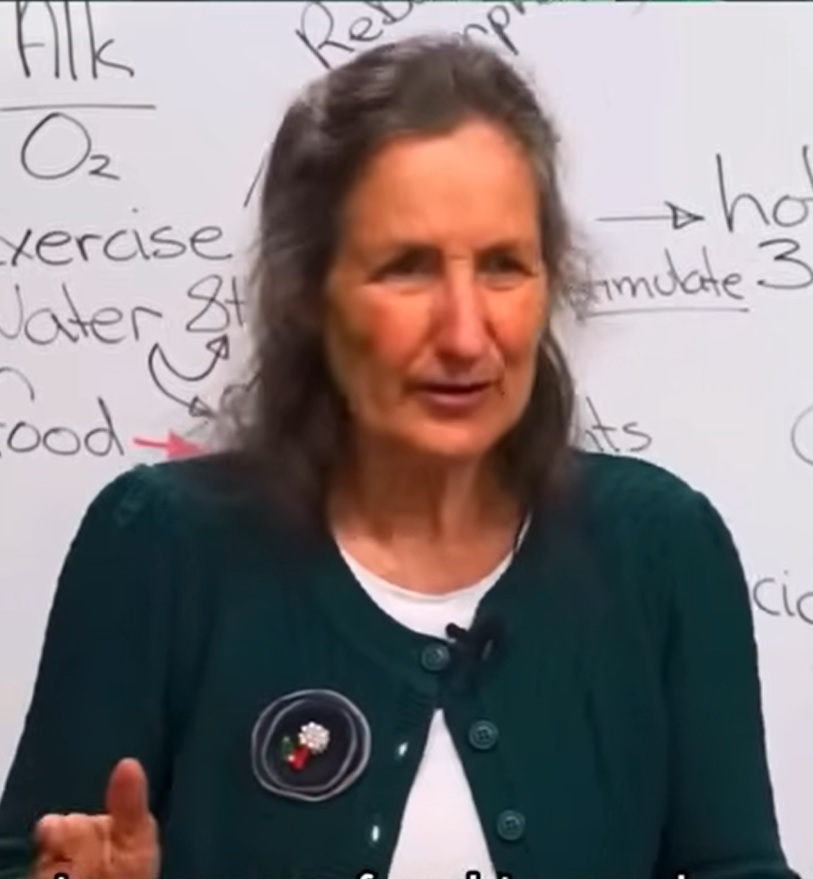
- Barbara O'Neill in 2024
- Occupation: Alternative medicine promoter
- Years active: 2004–
- Known for: Dangerous and unsubstantiated alternative medicine claims
- Spouse: Michael O’Neill
- Website: officialbarbaraoneill.com

Barbara O'Neill is an Australian alternative health care promoter who advertises unsupported health practices described as misinformation and a risk to health and safety by the New South Wales Health Care Complaints Commission. She does not have any recognised qualifications and did not finish nursing training. She has presented her claims at alternative medicine organisations, wellness retreats, and Seventh-day Adventist Churches. She is married to Michael O'Neill, the founder of the Informed Medical Options Party, now the Health, Environment, Accountability, Rights, Transparency (HEART) Party, an anti-vaccination and anti-fluoride political group.

In 2019, the Health Care Complaints Commission in New South Wales ruled that she is prohibited from providing any health-related services following several complaints from the public and health professionals. An investigation found that she provided dangerous advice to vulnerable patients, such as telling those with cancer to forgo prescribed chemotherapy for bicarbonate of soda, and to give infants unpasteurised goat's milk. The investigation found that she also did not have any qualifications in a health-related field, and that she failed to meet the expected standards of unregistered health professionals.

== Activities ==
O'Neill has promoted herself as a naturopath, nutritionist, and health educator since at least 2004, despite lacking any relevant qualifications or training. She has rejected the claim that her claims are unsupported, but admitted to not being able to provide any evidence when asked by the Health Care Complaints Commission.

As of 2019, she ran the Misty Mountain Health Retreat near Kempsey, NSW, with her husband, charging clients as much as A$2,450 for a one-week stay for one person, to A$8,800 for two people for two weeks. She also provided paid telephone consultations. According to O'Neill's website, she provided detox services claiming to aid recovery from heart disease, diabetes, hormonal imbalance, chronic fatigue, candida albicans (fungus), drug addiction, cancer, heartburn, and obesity.

She previously worked at health retreats in Australia before she was barred from doing so by the HCCC; she continues to conduct them internationally, including in the United States, New Zealand, and Fiji. O'Neill continues to deliver programs aimed at cancer patients in the United States as of July 2023 at a cost of almost US$6,000 per person.

As a member of the Seventh-day Adventist Church, she has also spoken at churches. Fred Hardinge, DrPH, MPH, Associate Health Ministries Director of the SDA Church, has written: "We are not able to recommend her as a speaker for churches or any gatherings." He cited her dubious claims, lack of training, and opposition to vaccines. In March 2025, she held sold out seminars at the Sacramento Central SDA church that were sponsored by Amazing Facts. The magazine Adventist Today covered the event and criticized her.

She has also published several books on health and nutrition which include dangerous claims and advice. Videos of her presentations have been viewed more than 700,000 times as of 2019.

In October, 2025, O'Neil was awarded the satirical Bent Spoon Award by the Australian Skeptics for her unfounded medical claims, such as promoting cayenne pepper for curing ulcers, claiming that placing sliced garlic on a baby's foot was stronger than an antibiotic, and using chopped onions to cure pneumonia. Australian Skeptic Tim Mendham stated, "With all her references to vegetables we'd say she was a shill for Big Farmer."

In August 2026 the online newspaper Egypt Independent reported that Egypt’s Supreme Council for Media Regulation (SCMR) banned Barbara O’Neill from appearing across Egyptian media outlets.She was due to run an event 2 - 7 November 2026 there.

In October 2026 The Guardian reported that health experts in the UK and the Republic Of Ireland raised concerns in a letter to venues across UK and Ireland where O’Neill, 73, is scheduled to speak.

The letter – which was organised by Dr David Robert Grimes, a science communicator and expert in Biostatistics at Trinity College Dublin – describes O’Neill as “a leading vector of medical misinformation”, adding that she repeatedly made “misguided medical assertions”, gave “unqualified advice” and promoted “abject demonisation of conventional medical treatment.”

Among those who have signed the letter are Orla Dolan, the chief executive of Breakthrough Cancer Research; Prof Colin Doherty, head of Trinity College Dublin School of Medicine; Prof David Colquhoun, a fellow of the Royal Society and University College London; and Sander van der Linden, professor of Psychology at the University of Cambridge.

== Unsubstantiated claims ==
=== Cancer ===
According to the HCCC investigation, O'Neill falsely claimed to be able to cure cancer and although she claimed that she did not give clients advice, she told clients that they would be more likely to cure their cancer if they did not use chemotherapy.

O'Neill promoted the discredited claim that cancer is a fungus that can be treated with baking soda, falsely claiming that a doctor had shown "a 90% success rate curing cancer with sodium bicarbonate injections". She also encouraged her clients to cure cancer by eating a low carbohydrate diet for six weeks.

In late 2019, it was revealed that a Cook Islands man with stage-four cancer had died after following O'Neill's advice, having declined medical intervention and attempting to treat his disease with bicarbonate soda, lemon juice, and boiled water. Supporters of O'Neill claim that he had been in remission for two years before his death.

=== Anti-vaccination ===
O'Neill discourages immunisation, claiming that all vaccines are harmful and cause a range of conditions. In one of her YouTube videos, she stated that "children can be naturally vaccinated against tetanus by drinking plenty of water, going to bed early, not eating junk food and running around the hills".

O'Neill has campaigned against the No Jab, No Pay initiative, which primarily affects eligibility for Child Care Subsidy and partially reduces Family Tax Benefit payments for children who are not up-to-date with vaccinations. She is also associated with the HEART Party, a known alternative health and anti-vaccination political group led by her husband, Michael O'Neill, that has drawn significant criticism from medical associations and health professionals.

=== Antibiotics ===
In several of her YouTube videos, O'Neill discourages the use of antibiotics, promoting the disproven claim that they cause cancer. She has told pregnant women it is unnecessary to take antibiotics for group B streptococcal infection because "no baby has ever died from Strep B catching out of birth". In reality, the Royal Australian and New Zealand College of Obstetricians and Gynaecologists' statistics show that 14% of newborns who contract early-onset streptococcal B infections die, and that antibiotics can reduce this risk dramatically.

=== Infant nutrition ===
O'Neill has recommended that parents unable to breastfeed their infant use substitutes besides formula. These have included unpasteurised goat milk and a mix of almond milk and dates or bananas. Co-author of the National Health and Medical Research Council (NHMRC) infant feeding guidelines Jane Scott has stated this advice is "definitely not safe," and that "there is a real danger here for infants as these will not support healthy growth and development".

When provided with the NHMRC infant feeding guidelines for health practitioners, which provide evidence-based recommendations, O'Neill said that she had never read them and that she would refuse to.

=== Pap Smears and Mammograms ===
In part of one of her lectures found on TikTok, (shown below), O'Neill attempted to dissuade women from having Pap Smear tests and mammograms, claiming that they cause cancer.

This is contrary to expert advice on cervical cancer detection published by organisatons, such as the Australian Department of Health, Disability and Aging who say 'The National Cervical Screening Program reduces illness and death from cervical cancer,' and on breast cancer detection by mammography by the U.S. Preventive Services Task Force, the American College of Radiology, Society of Breast Imaging, the American Cancer Society, the Canadian Task Force on Preventive Health Care and the European Cancer Observatory.

Barbara O'Neill lecture dissuading women from Pap Smears and mammograms

== Criminal investigations ==
=== Health Care Complaints Commission ===
Between October 2018 and January 2019, the New South Wales Health Care Complaints Commission (HCCC) received several complaints from health practitioners and the general public about O'Neill's health advice. There was a complaint that the advice she gave on infant nutrition could lead to death if followed, as she acknowledged her recommendations were not based on any established guidelines or evidence.

The Commission found that some of her recommendations were based on ideas espoused by Tullio Simoncini, a disgraced Italian former oncologist and alternative health advocate incarcerated for fraud and manslaughter following the death of one of his patients. Some of her guidance was based on the views of clinicians who patients sued for not providing appropriate treatment. When the HCCC noted these facts to O'Neill, she stated that she still intended to use their advice.

The HCCC also found that O'Neill could not recognise and provide health advice within the limits of her training and experience, and had failed to maintain records of the health advice she provided as required by law. While O'Neill has claimed to have received diplomas in naturopathy, nutrition, and dietetics from two now-defunct organisations, the HCCC found that she did not have any health-related qualifications. O'Neill claimed that she was merely providing clients with information rather than health advice, and that she never claimed to be able to cure cancer.

==== Prohibition Order ====
The HCCC ultimately found that O'Neill's actions had breached five clauses of the Code of Conduct for Unregistered Health Practitioners and that she poses a risk to the health and safety of the general public.

On 24 September 2019, the HCCC indefinitely banned O'Neill from providing health services or education in any capacity, regardless of whether she accepted payment. This precludes her from giving lectures, public speaking, or seeing clients.

A HCCC spokesperson said that O'Neill's activities were being monitored closely and the prohibition order applies across New South Wales, Victoria, Queensland, and South Australia. He also stated, "In general, if the material is accessible in [those jurisdictions] online, then it is considered to be delivering a health service", and that "Presenting health education in any form or delivering health services would be a breach of her prohibition order."

Following the decision, O'Neill launched an online petition calling for the HCCC to reverse its decision. Accompanying the petition, O'Neill comments that, “It looks a bit dark now, but the Great God of the Universe will not let His wonderful health truth to be eliminated, regardless of how men and women may try.” She has also claimed to the press that she is a victim of a Nazi-style propaganda campaign.

=== Australian Charities and Not-for-profits Commission ===
In late 2019, O’Neill and her husband's Misty Mountain Health Retreat were investigated by the Australian Charities and Not-for-profits Commission for alleged breaches of Australian charity law. Under its health promotion charity status, the Retreat had received government grants and various tax concessions. In defending its status, the Retreat had claimed it had provided diet, exercise and health advice to Aboriginal and Torres Strait Islander peoples and people with chronic and terminal illnesses, and that it had previously been branded as "The Aboriginal Healing Centre".

Although the HCCC ruling prevented her from providing or promoting her services, O'Neill continued to advertise through her website and that of the Misty Mountain Health Retreat.

Misty Mountain Health Retreat lost its charity status in 2021.

=== Investigations in the Cook Islands ===
In October 2019, Cook Islands health secretary Josephine Herman expressed concern after learning O'Neill had been running health workshops in Rarotonga, and referred the matter to the chief medical officer for investigation. Herman raised concerns regarding O'Neill's suitability to be delivering health services, including the legal requirement of an annual practising certificate amongst other documentation.
