= Light for Riley =

Public health campaign for whooping cough

- Formation: 2015
- Type: Health campaign
- Key people: Catherine and Greg Hughes, founders
- Website: ifa.org.au/lightforriley

Light for Riley is a public health campaign with the aim of increasing awareness of the disease whooping cough (pertussis) and improving vaccination rates. It was founded by Catherine and Greg Hughes in 2015, after they lost their baby Riley to the disease.

== Background ==
In his first month of life, Riley Hughes fell ill with what seemed like a cold. He was admitted to hospital, where he was diagnosed with whooping cough (pertussis). Despite the best efforts of medical staff, Riley succumbed to the disease when he was 32 days old. Riley had been too young to be vaccinated, with the whooping cough vaccination schedule beginning at six weeks of age, and so was relying on others around him to be vaccinated.

It was at this time that his mother, Catherine Hughes, learned that if she had received a whooping cough booster during her third trimester, Riley could still be alive. Having been vaccinated for the disease as a child and boosted three years earlier, Hughes had previously been assured by medical professionals that she had done everything necessary to protect her baby. However, she discovered that the United States and several European countries had been recommending a vaccine booster to pregnant women. In the UK, the vaccine had been responsible for a dramatic decrease in whooping cough deaths. There was evidence to confirm that the vaccination was safe during pregnancy and that it was 80 to 90 per cent effective at preventing the disease in newborns. But at the time of Hughes' pregnancy, Queensland was the only state in Australia to offer the vaccine during pregnancy, and in Western Australia, Hughes had not heard of it being available to pregnant women. At that time in mid-March, there had already been 252 known cases of pertussis for the year.

In order to change this, Catherine and Greg Hughes decided to campaign for this vaccine booster to be offered to the pregnant women of WA. In a widely shared, public Facebook post, Catherine announced the passing of her son Riley. She also allowed the media to tell her story, which was then widely publicised. After being overwhelmed with offers of condolence and support, the "Light for Riley' tribute page was created. This was intended firstly to be a focal point for sympathy and support. Secondly, it was to bring awareness to whooping cough in infants and of its prevention through vaccination. The campaign brought much attention to the cause, with more than 33,000 people signing up to the page in its first 24 hours. Later, in January 2016, Catherine Hughes shared a video to the Light for Riley Facebook page of Riley suffering through his whooping cough, which quickly garnered more than 300,000 views.

== Initiatives and achievements ==
Shortly after Riley's death, it was announced that free whooping cough vaccines would be available to pregnant women in Western Australia. It was anticipated that 2,500 women each month would be eligible to receive it. This free booster program was very successful, with around 62 per cent of eligible women opting to receive the vaccine in only its first few months. This was in contrast to the United Kingdom, where, despite the program having been running for some years, the uptake was only 16 per cent. The WA health director general at the time, David Russell-Weisz, would later acknowledge the Hughes' role in bringing awareness to the need for this vaccine program.

Eventually, all Australian states followed Western Australia's and Queensland's lead and began offering free vaccine boosters to pregnant women. In 2018, it was announced by federal health minister Greg Hunt that all pregnant women in Australia would be offered a free whooping cough vaccine, as it would be added to the National Immunisation Register.

Another initiative of the Light for Riley campaign has been to encourage people to donate vaccines to UNICEF. In the first twelve months following Riley's death, they saw over 100,000 vaccines donated in the baby's name. Catherine and Greg Hughes have attended numerous baby expos around Australia, bringing awareness to whooping cough and the vaccine. At one Melbourne expo in 2017, they were responsible for 430 people pledging to be vaccinated. In their "No Vax, No Visit" campaign, they point out that most infants are infected with pertussis by adults, and that the onus is solely on pregnant women to educate adults about keeping their vaccinations up to date.

The Hughes also established the Immunisation Foundation of Australia, whose aim is to inspire community-based immunisation advocacy. This is done by educating the general community about the impact and prevention of all vaccine-preventable diseases.

In 2018, the Western Australian health department revealed that the number of whooping cough cases in WA had fallen 20 per cent since Riley Hughes' death. Their figures showed that the number of infections had been rising each year until 2015 but had then fallen to their lowest level in recent years. A health department spokesperson said the Light for Riley foundation had helped WA achieve some of the highest whooping cough immunisation rates in the world for pregnant women.

== Awards ==
In 2015, Greg and Catherine Hughes received the Director General's Award at the WA Health Excellence Awards. The health director general David Russell-Weisz acknowledged the Hughes' ongoing courage and strength to "raise awareness of pertussis and ensure their plight was never experienced by another Western Australian family".

In the same year, the couple received the Australian Skeptics – Fred Thornett Award for the Promotion of Reason. This award acknowledges someone who has made a significant contribution to educating or informing the public regarding issues of science and reason.

In 2016, Catherine Hughes received the Young Australian of the Year, State Recipient for Western Australia award. She was also a 2016 semifinalist in The Australian Women's Weekly's "Women of the Future" Awards. Other awards the couple has received include the AMP Foundation Tomorrow Maker Award in 2018 and the Mylee Manning Award of Recognition 2019.

In the Queen's Birthday honours of 2022, Catherine Hughes was appointed a Member of the Order of Australia for her services to immunisation.
