= Desiree Schell =

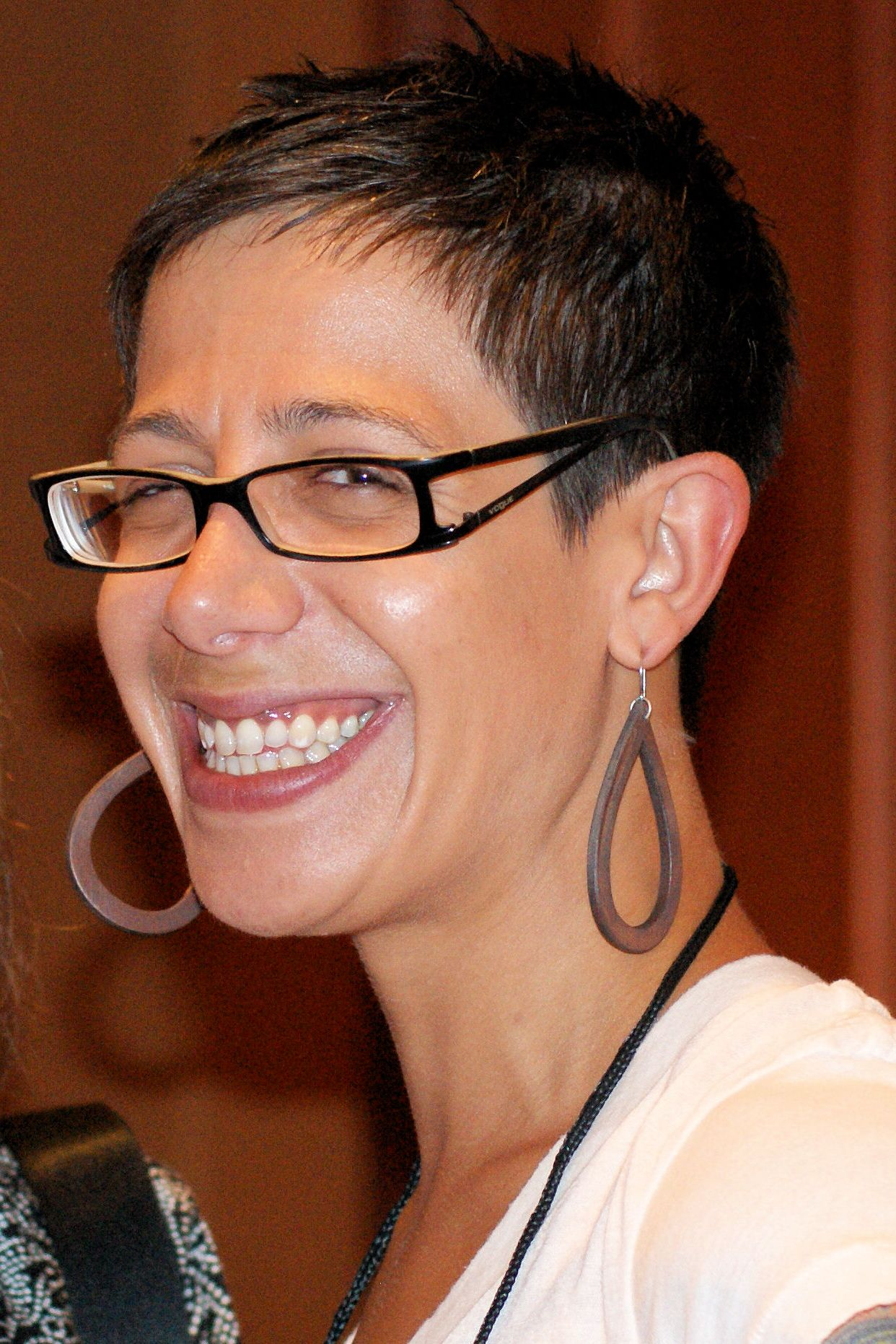
- Schell at The Amaz!ng Meeting (TAM) 9, held July 2011 in Las Vegas, Nevada
- Citizenship: Canadian
- Occupations: Radio Show Host, Lecturer, Labour Organizer, Blogger
- Years active: 2008 - Present
- Known for: Notable Skeptic Speaker for Center for Inquiry (CFI), host of the Skeptically Speaking, and featured speaker at The Amazing Meeting.

Desiree Schell is the host of the live Canadian call-in radio talk show and podcast, "Science for the People". An advocate for scientific skepticism, Schell is a strong advocate of critical thinking and is strongly interested in the promotion of skepticism publicly. In her work as a labour organizer Schell creates curricula and teaches courses on effective activism, drawing on the experience of other social movements.

Desiree has also blogged for The Paltry Sapien.

== Skeptical Activism ==
In 2011 Schell was a featured speaker at The Amazing Meeting and has, "emerged as one of skepticism’s most open and innovative public voices". She has made numerous appearances including SkeptiCamp Alberta in July 2010, LOGICON, SkepchickCon, Imagine No Religion 2, the CFI Student Leadship Conference, and the Women In Secularism 2 conference in May 2013. Schell is a member of the Speaker Bureau for the Center for Inquiry.

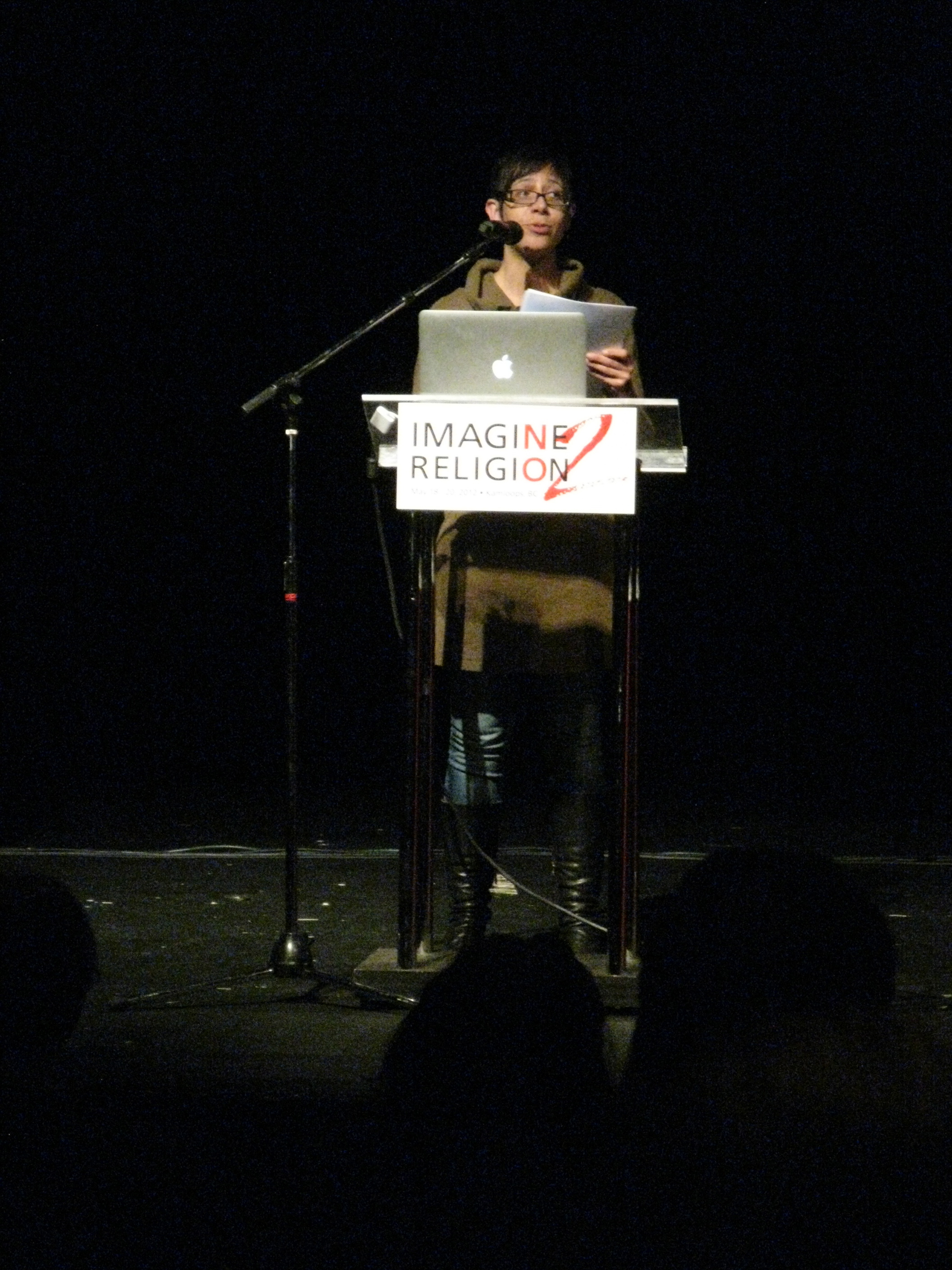
Schell speaking at the Imagine No Religion 2 conference in Kamloops BC, May 2012

Along with Maria Walters, Trevor Zimmerman, and K. O. Meyers, Schell created The Skeptical Activism Campaign Manual. She advocates single-issue campaigns with a clear objective and a measurable outcome. In a 2011 interview with the Young Australian Skeptics Schell states, "Activism takes a long time; you don't change things overnight. Like evolution, it's those small incremental changes that are so important." In an interview with Kylie Sturgess Schell states, "We are a young movement but we can learn from other movements. We have access to all these studies done around science communication and around science education. We need to use that kind of research the way we would for homeopathy."

Schell states, "Skepticism 2.0’s rebirth is a demographically broad social movement. We really want to spread critical thinking to the broadest possible audience. In order to do that, we as skeptics need to discuss ways that we can make our message more inclusive." In a 2011 interview Schell states, "Skepticism is getting larger. If you want to represent different viewpoints you have to get different people with different viewpoints to represent them." "If you genuinely want them involved you have to genuinely take them seriously."

=== Outreach ===
In a biography for The Skeptics Society Schell cites an essay by Junior Skeptic Magazine Editor Daniel Loxton, "Where do we go from here?", as a source of inspiration for her skeptical outreach. "It brought home just how much work there really is to do, but it also helped me understand that we can move beyond simply being skeptics ourselves. With enough effort and the right planning, we really can help people become better critical thinkers." "There is more to skepticism than just being right." Schell also advises those interested in activism to, "know your audience" and understand your resources, people, money, and supplies. Look for allies that may want to support your cause.

=== Science for the People ===
The radio show is based out of CJSR in Edmonton, Canada. Started in March 2009, it currently airs live every Friday night at 6 pm MST. The show is also streamed live at Skepticallyspeaking.com and is rebroadcast by several radio stations in Canada and the United States. The show is also available as an MP3 download on the website and via Apple's iTunes.

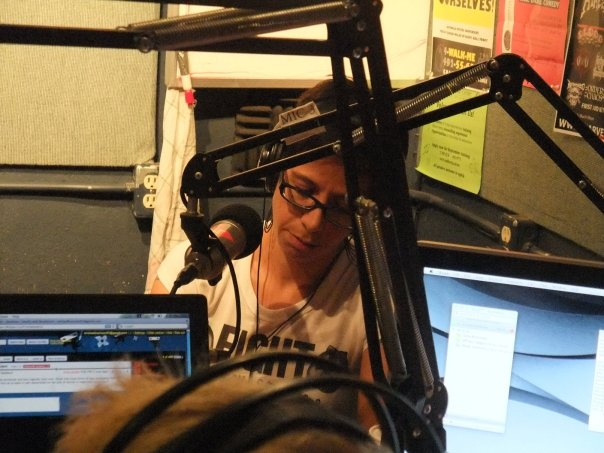
Desiree Schell at CJSR

Science for the People is known for investigating social and gender issues in skepticism and for attempting to make skepticism a demographically broad social movement. It features interviews with prominent skeptics, researchers, and scientists including Adam Savage, Derek Colanduno, Phil Plait, and Carl Zimmer. Skeptically Speaking explores the connections between science and skepticism and looks at strategies for promoting critical thinking beyond the ranks of current Skeptics.

=== 60 Second Science ===
Schell is an International Judge for an Australian Project called 60 Second Science, a science promotion campaign encouraging students to submit a 60-second video with a science theme.
