= Australian Skeptics =

Skeptic organisation

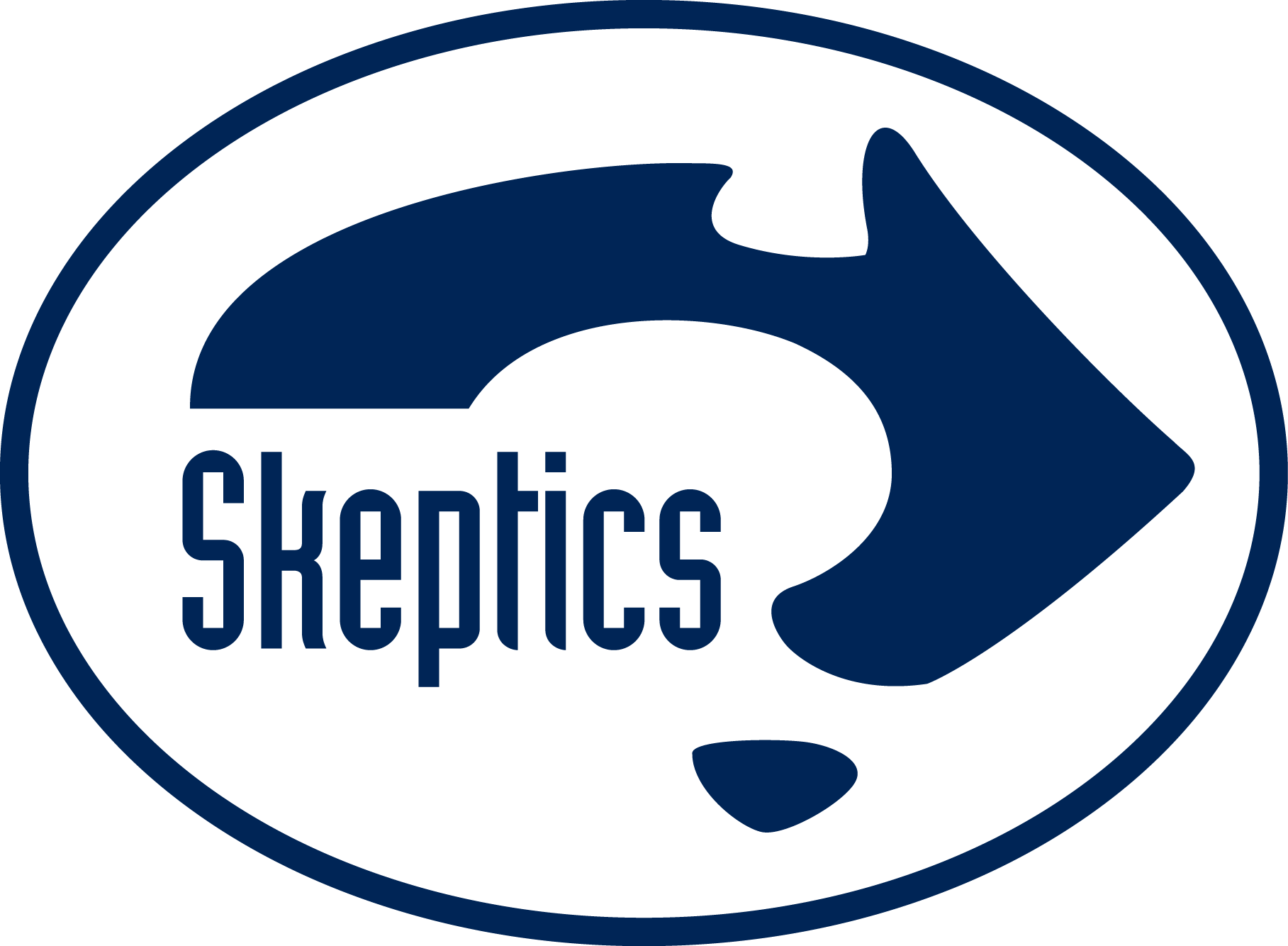
- Formation: 1980; 46 years ago
- Purpose: "Investigating pseudo-science and the paranormal from a responsible scientific viewpoint"
- Region served: Australia
- Publication: The Skeptic
- Website: skeptics.com.au

Australian Skeptics is a loose confederation of like-minded organisations across Australia that began in 1980. Australian Skeptics investigate paranormal and pseudoscientific claims using scientific methodologies. This page covers all Australian skeptical groups which are of this mindset. The name "Australian Skeptics" can be confused with one of the more prominent groups, "Australian Skeptics Inc", which is based in Sydney and is one of the central organising groups within Australian Skeptics.

== Origins ==
In 1979, Mark Plummer (later president of Australian Skeptics) sent a letter to the American skeptical magazine The Zetetic in which he expressed interest in beginning a skeptical organisation in Australia. Sydney electronics entrepreneur Dick Smith responded to the letter, and offered to sponsor a visit to Australia by James Randi, the principal investigator for the American-based Committee for the Scientific Investigation of Claims of the Paranormal (CSICOP), now known as the Committee for Skeptical Inquiry (CSI), part of the non-profit organisation Center for Inquiry (CFI), which are joint publishers of the Skeptical Inquirer. During this visit, James Randi, Dick Smith, Phillip Adams, Richard Carleton and an unidentified businessman offered a $50,000 prize to anyone who could prove psychic phenomena in front of Randi. A number of contenders, largely water diviners came forward, but all failed to prove their claims in front of independent observers.

The Australian Skeptics formed in 1980 out of this event, with the original purpose of continuing to test claims of the paranormal, with committee members Mark Plummer (president), James Gerrand (secretary), Joe Rubinstein (treasurer), and Allan Christophers, as well as Bill Cook, John Crellin, Logan Elliot, Peter Kemeny, Loris Purcell, and Mike Wilton. It was at this time that the group adopted the name "Australian Skeptics". The amount of the prize was raised to AU$100,000 and it has been offered since then (see The $100,000 Prize below). Very soon after the original formation of the Australian Skeptics in Victoria, Barry Williams from Sydney, New South Wales (NSW), responded to a call from Dick Smith seeking interest for new members. He became involved, and the New South Wales committee formed. The NSW committee included Barry Williams (president), Tim Mendham (secretary/treasurer), Mel Dickson, Dick Champion, Jean Whittle and others. The Australian Skeptics are the second oldest English language skeptical group in the world after CSICOP in the US. Tim Mendham joined the NSW committee from the very first meeting and went on to become secretary, treasurer, and editor of the magazine.

In 1986, the year after the first national convention in Sydney (see below), Mark Plummer stepped down as national president when he began a new job as an executive officer at CSICOP in the US. At this time the NSW Skeptics group took over the role as the national secretariat and the national committee, but the magazine production remained in Victoria with various editors including James Durand. The national committee did not consist of representative from all the state organisations, but rather was just of the state groups which acted as the national organising committee. "Australian Skeptics incorporated in NSW" (Australian Skeptics Inc. - ASI) became an incorporated association in 1986 in NSW with Barry Williams as president.

ASI still operates today and is responsible for several national activities, such as the publication of The Skeptic magazine and coordination of awards (listed below) and the annual conventions. Today ASI is one of many formal and informal skeptical groups throughout Australia that fall under the general umbrella title of "Australian Skeptics". Over time, other branches around Australia became incorporated including Australian Skeptics (Victorian Branch) Inc, Skeptics (S.A.) Incorporated, Hunter Skeptics Incorporated, Canberra Skeptics and Borderline Skeptics Inc (which caters for skeptics living around the NSW and Victorian border). ASI is the local group in NSW.

In 1995 the Australian Skeptics received a sizeable bequest from the estate of Stanley David Whalley. With these funds the organisation established the "Australian Skeptics Science and Education Foundation", tasked to expose "irrational activities and pseudoscience and to encourage critical thinking and the scientific view". This foundation now funds the "Thornett award for promotion of reason", known affectionately as "the Fred", named after the late Fred Thornett, an influential figure in the skeptical movement in Tasmania and nationally. "The Fred" is a $1000 prize given by ASI for significant contribution to educating or informing the public regarding issues of science and reason. The bequest also allowed for the introduction of a paid position, that of executive officer. This position is answerable to the ASI committee, and traditionally manages accounts, queries from the public and media, editing The Skeptic, and various sundry tasks. Barry Williams was executive officer from 1995 to 2009, followed by Karen Stollznow (2009) and Tim Mendham from 2009 to the present.

In 1989 at a national committee meeting the aims of Australian Skeptics were updated and drafted as follows:

- To investigate claims of pseudoscientific, paranormal and similarly anomalous phenomena from a responsible, scientific point of view.
- To publicise the results of these investigations and, where appropriate, to draw attention to the possibility of natural and ordinary explanations of such phenomena.
- To accept explanations and hypotheses about paranormal occurrences only after good evidence has been adduced, which directly or indirectly supports such hypotheses.
- To encourage Australians and the Australian news media to adopt a critical attitude towards paranormal claims and to understand that to introduce or to entertain a hypothesis does not constitute confirmation or proof of that hypothesis.
- To stimulate inquiry and the quest for truth, wherever it leads.

As of 2015, every state and territory within Australia has its own regional branch, and some have their own newsletters, with new local skeptics' groups springing up in Melbourne, Brisbane, Adelaide, Launceston and Darwin.

== Awards and prizes ==
=== Thornett Award for the Promotion of Reason ===
The Thornett Award for the Promotion of Reason, affectionately known as "The Fred" (much like the Academy Award is known as the "Oscar"), is named after Fred Thornett, a noted member of Australian Skeptics from Tasmania who died in April 2009. The Fred award includes a $2000 cash prize (increased from $1000 in 2018) that is given to the recipient or to a charity or cause of their choice. It is awarded annually to a member of the public or a public figure who has made a significant contribution to educating or informing the public regarding issues of science and reason.

Year	Winner	Reason
2025	Robyn Williams	"'Robyn is a justifiably famous national living icon, and his dedication to science, reason and truth over the years makes him a highly worthy winner.'"
2024	Dr Nikki Milne	
2023	Nathan Eggins	
2021	Prof Kristine Macartney, NCIRS	
2020	Dr Vyom Sharma	GP and magician, who has maintained his cool while imparting information that is both accurate and understandable when bringing his medical and scientific expertise to bear on COVID-19, despite what has been a hazardous road full of pseudoscientific pitfalls.
2019	Guy Nolch	Former publisher of the magazine Australasian Science which ceased publication in 2019.
2018	Ian Musgrave	For being a long-standing and effective science communicator in the area of pharmacology and providing a voice of reason in challenging "chem-phobia".
2017	John Cunningham	In recognition of his continued and authoritative exposure of chiropractic misconduct and anti-vaccination misrepresentation.
2016	Jill Hennessy MP	For courageously facing down those who misrepresent and mislead the public in their promotion of dodgy medical claims and practices.
2015	Catherine & Greg Hughes "Light for Riley"	Continuing the fight against vaccine preventable diseases after the death of their son Riley from pertussis.
2014	Northern Rivers Vaccination Supporters	A grassroots pro-vaccination group in a northern NSW region which has among the lowest vaccination rates in the country.
2013	Sonya Pemberton	For her documentary Jabbed, a dramatic presentation on the impact of delaying or refusing immunisation.
2012	Adam vanLangenberg	For his work in founding McKinnon Secondary College in Melbourne’s skeptical club.
2011	Ken Harvey	For taking great personal risks in exposing pseudomedicine claims, including his much publicised stoush with the SensaSlim company.
2010	Wendy Wilkinson and Ken McLeod	For their relentless campaign to ensure that the Australian (anti)Vaccination Network's activities are brought into the light of official scrutiny, and their subsequent success in this campaign. The prize in 2010 was doubled (not shared).
2009	Toni and David McCaffery	For their unstinting and extremely brave efforts on behalf of children in the face of the anti-vaccination movement.

=== Skeptic of the Year ===
The Skeptic of the Year award is given annually to someone associated with the skeptical community who has been particularly active over the previous year. ASI coordinates the prize, and the final decision is voted on by representatives from the various Australian Skeptics groups.

Year	Winner
2023	Paul Gallagher
2020	Mandy-Lee Noble
2017	Christine Bayne
2016	Mal Vickers and Ken Harvey
2014	Peter Tierney
2013	Simon Chapman
2012	Friends of Science in Medicine
2011	Loretta Marron
2010	Stop the AVN
2007	Loretta Marron
2006	Karl Kruszelnicki
2004	Lynne Kelly
2002	Paul Willis
2000	John Dwyer
1999	Cheryl Freeman
1998	Mike Archer
1997	Peter Doherty
1996	Derek Freeman

=== Barry Williams Award for Skeptical Journalism ===
The Barry Williams Award for Skeptical Journalism which recognises "the best piece of journalism (in any medium) that takes a critical and skeptical approach to a topic" within the scope of the Australian Skeptics. The award is named in memory of Barry Williams who died in 2018 and carries a $AU2000 prize. Williams was a past president and executive officer of Australian Skeptics who regularly appeared in the Australian media. The award has been nicknamed "the Wallaby" after the nom-de-plume Sir Jim R Wallaby, used by Williams in some of his more whimsical writing.

Year	Winner	Reason
2025	Henrietta Cook and Liam Mannix	For "'their story on the use of the toxic substance belladonna for infant colic.'"
2024	Henrietta Cook	
2023	Media Watch	
2021	Melissa Davey	
2020	Dr Norman Swan, and Science Friction (Click-Sick episodes)	Dr Norman Swan of the ABC Health Report, and the ABC Radio National program Science Friction, have both presented serious, rational and uncompromising pieces on the COVID-19 pandemic and how to deal with its effects, across a range of media platforms.
2019	Liam Mannix	Reporter who writes with a critical approach for The Age and The Sydney Morning Herald.
2018	Jane Hansen	Reporter for News Corp, who has written extensively on the anti-vaccination and anti-fluoride movements, fad diets, and quack cures.

=== Bent Spoon Awards ===
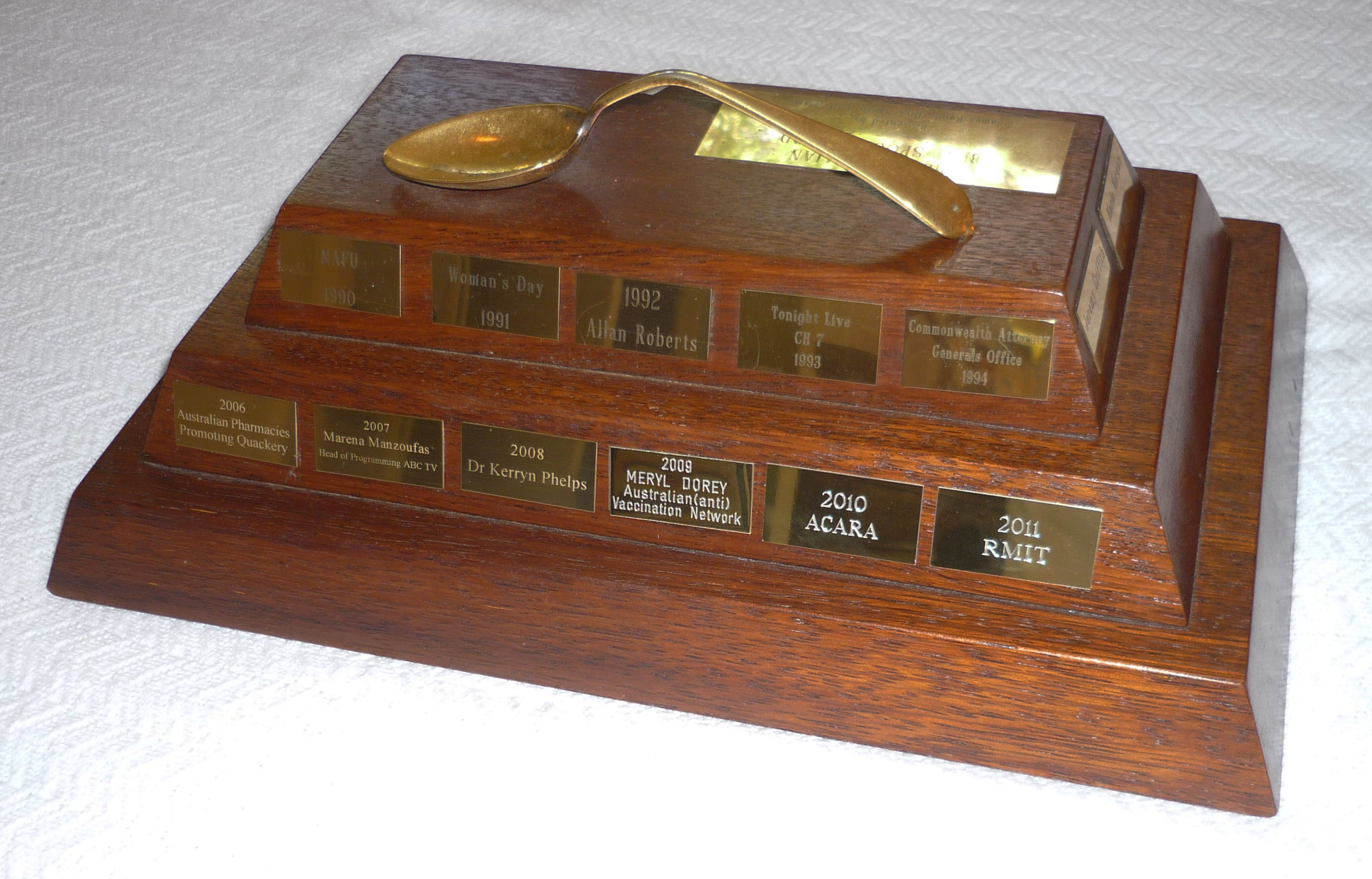
The ASI Bent Spoon Award

The Bent Spoon Award is an annual award coordinated by ASI, although the final decision is voted on by representatives from the various groups comprising Australian Skeptics. It is "presented to the perpetrator of the most preposterous piece of paranormal or pseudoscientific piffle" in a tongue-in-cheek fashion. The group describe the award trophy as follows:

A piece of timber, which we had no reason to doubt was an off cut of gopher wood from the Ark construction site, was polished to a high gloss and thereupon was affixed a spoon, which, rumour suggests, may have been used at the Last Supper. The spoon, having been tastefully bent into a graceful curve, by energies that are, we suspect, unknown to science, is plated with gold by means of a deposition process long thought lost with the submergence of Atlantis.

Although awarded annually since 1982, only one copy of the trophy exists, as "anyone wishing to acquire the trophy must remove it from our keeping by paranormal means" and no winner has yet overcome this obstacle.

The award is offered only to Australian individuals or groups, or those who have carried out their activities in Australia. The New Zealand Skeptics have a similar Bent Spoon Award.

Year	Winner	Position	Reason
2026	Dolly Adamson	Psychic Medium	For claiming to get messages from murdered or missing children and adults, including the Beaumont children (presumed murdered in 1966), Joanne Ratcliffe and Kirste Gordon (missing since 1973), William Tyrrell and Madeleine McCann. Adamson also claimed to get messages from the ghost of Dezi Freeman, who murdered two policemen in 2025. However at the time of the messages, January 2026, Freeman was still alive and on the run.
2025	Barbara O'Neill	naturopath	"'In 2019, the Health Care Complaints Commission in New South Wales ruled that she is prohibited from providing any health-related services in Australia. An investigation found that she provided dangerous advice to vulnerable patients'".
2024	Cancer Council WA		For endorsing the practices of reiki and reflexology.
2023	Ross Coulthart	Award-winning journalist	For espousing UFO conspiracies, including unsubstantiated claims that world governments and The Vatican are hiding extraterrestrial alien bodies and spacecraft on Earth.
2022	Maria Carmela Pau	Spiritual healer and self-described COVID denier	For pretending to be a medical doctor to issue false COVID exemptions, reportedly making $120,000 from 1200 certificates.
2021	Craig Kelly	United Australia Party MP	For misinformation about COVID and vaccinations for some time, offering dubious cures, conspiracy theories, and an interesting way with statistics
2020	Pete Evans	Former celebrity chef	For the promotion of the pseudoscientific non-medical BioCharger and continuing his anti-vaccination position.
2019	SBS-TV	TV program – Medicine or Myth?	For misinforming the public as to how products and therapies can or should be tested for safety and effectiveness.
2018	Sarah Stevenson	Video blogger "Sarah's Day"	For spreading misinformation about health via her online following of over 1 million people.
2017	National Institute of Complementary Medicine at the University of Western Sydney		For continuing to promote unproven treatments and being involved in a project to establish a traditional Chinese medicine clinic on campus.
2016	Judy Wilyman, Brian Martin and the Faculty of Social Sciences at University of Wollongong		For awarding a doctorate on the basis of a PhD thesis riddled with errors, misstatements, poor and unsupported 'evidence' and conspiratorial thinking.
2015	Pete Evans	Chef, author and television personality	For his support of pseudomedicine, his stance against fluoridation, and his association with Stephen Mercola.
2014	Larry Marshall	Chief Executive, CSIRO	For his support of water divining.
2013	Chiropractors' Association of Australia and the Chiropractic Board of Australia		For failing to ensure their own members – including some committee members – adhere to their policy announcements.
2012	Fran Sheffield	Homeopathy Plus!	For advocating the use of magical sugar and water in place of tried and true vaccination for many deadly diseases, most notably whooping cough.
2011	RMIT University (Royal Melbourne Institute of Technology)		For having a fundamentalist chiropractic education program – if the word education can be used in this way – and for endorsing the practice by targeting children and infants in their on-campus paediatric chiropractic clinics.
2010	The Australian Curriculum and Reporting Authority (ACARA)		For its draft science curriculum.
2009	Meryl Dorey and the deceptively named Australian Vaccination Network ∞		For spreading fear and misinformation about vaccines.
2008	Kerryn Phelps	Former head of the AMA	For lending her name to a clinic offering various unproven ‘alternative’ remedies.
2007	Marena Manzoufas	Head of programming at the ABC	For authorising the television show Psychic Investigators.
2006	The pharmacists of Australia		For managing to forget their scientific training long enough to sell quackery and snake oil (such as homoeopathy and ear candles) in places where consumers should expect to get real medical supplies and advice.^{[Editorializing]}
2005	The ABC television program Second Opinion		For the uncritical presentation of many forms of quackery.
2004	The producers of the ABC television show The New Inventors		Principally for giving consideration to an obvious piece of pseudoscience, the AntiBio water conditioning system.
2003	The Complementary Healthcare Council		
2002	Gentle Heal Pty Ltd		For the selling of fake (homoeopathic) vaccine.
2001	The Lutec "Free Energy Generator"		
2000	Jasmuheen		For claiming one can live without food and water.
1999	Mike Willesee		For the documentary Signs From God.
1998	Southern Cross University		For offering a degree course in naturopathy, while also claiming to be conducting research into whether there was actually any validity to naturopathy.
1997	Viera Scheibner	Anti-immunisation advocate.	
1996	Marlo Morgan	American new age author	For claiming in her book, Mutant Message Downunder, that Australian Aborigines could levitate.
1995	Tim McCartney-Snape		for promotion of the beliefs of Jeremy Griffith self described prophet and founder of the World Transformation Movement, the Foundation for the Adulthood of Mankind.
1994	Commonwealth Attorney-General		For an enterprise agreement with its 2,400 employees that included a clause so any employee, who had taken sick leave, need not provide a medical certificate signed by a medical practitioner, but could provide one signed by a naturopath, herbalist, iridologist, chiropractor or one of assorted other "alternative" practitioners.
1993	Steve Vizard	Tonight Live television programme on Channel 7.	
1992	Allen S Roberts	Archaeological research consultant and fundamentalist pastor	For a search for Noah’s Ark.
1991	Woman's Day magazine		For its coverage and support of the paranormal, in particular astrology.
1990	Mafu	Multilifed entity	For being channelled by Penny Torres Rubin and who, despite millennia of experience, was remarkable for the banality of his/her pronouncements.
1989	Diane McCann		For writing that Adelaide was built on one of the temples of Atlantis.
1988	None		
1987	Anne Dankbaar	Adelaide psychic	For her discovery of the Colossus of Rhodes, which created something of a media stir until it was shown to be modern builder's rubble.
1986	Peter Brock	Prominent racing driver	For his highly touted "energy polariser" which generated more heat in the motoring media than it did energy in his car.
1985	The Findhorn Festival Group		For sponsoring the visit to Australia of American psychic dentist Willard Fuller. "Brother" Willard left town just ahead of some injunctions from real dentists.
1984	Melbourne Metropolitan Board of Works		For its payment of $1,823 to US psychic archaeologist Karen Hunt to use divining rods to detect an alleged "electromagnetic photo field".
1983	Dennis Hassel	Melbourne mystic	For the trick of making his hand disappear.
1982	Tom Wards	Self-proclaimed psychic	For predictions in the popular press which were renowned for their inaccuracy.

∞ In 2012 the Australian Vaccination Network was ordered by the New South Wales Office of Fair Trading to change its name within two months. The order was challenged, but the challenge was dismissed, and in 2014 the group changed its name to the Australian Vaccination-Skeptics Network.

=== $100,000 Prize ===
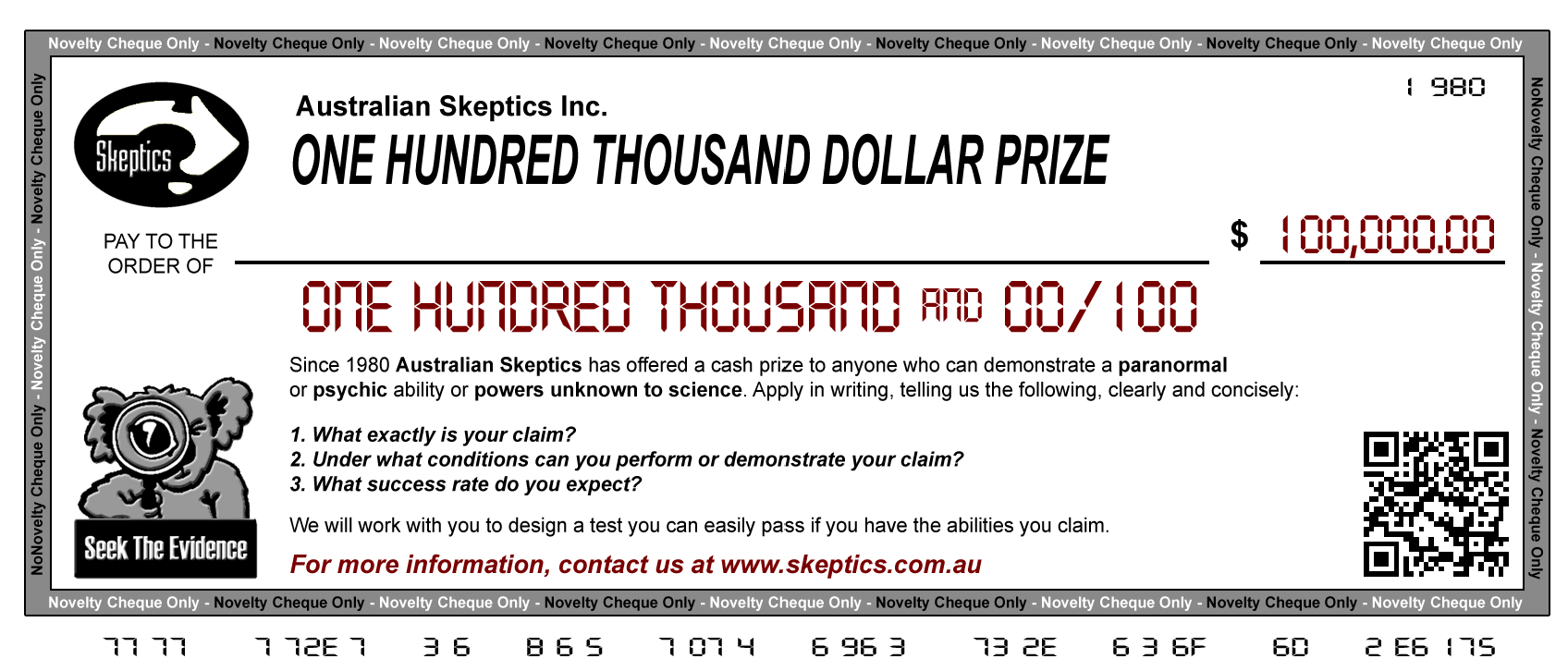

Since its foundation in 1980, Australian Skeptics has been offering a cash prize to anyone who can prove they have psychic or paranormal powers and is able to demonstrate their ability under proper observing conditions. The offer has been made in an effort to seek out the truth of paranormal claims such as those of psychics, healers, witnesses to paranormal events and those selling devices which claim to defy scientific laws. If someone nominates another person, and that person is successful, then 20% of the prize may be awarded to the nominator.

The challenge originally offered $50,000 to any water diviner who was able to demonstrate their powers, and it was later raised, with contributions from various sources, to AU$100,000 offered to anyone who could demonstrate any form of paranormal or psychic ability unknown to science. Up to the end of 2018, more than 200 claims have been seriously investigated but none of them has produced a positive result.

This challenge is now coordinated by ASI and the prize money is backed by the Australian Skeptics Science and Education Foundation. It is open to any contender who can state exactly what their paranormal claim is, and the claim can give a definite yes or no result. They must define under what conditions the claim can be performed, and expect to beat million to one odds in order to claim success. The result of each test is then published in The Skeptic, the magazine of Australian Skeptics. ASI states that should any contender pass the challenge, and be awarded the prize, they want to tell the world and give the claimant proper recognition. If, however, a claim is proved to be unfounded or fraudulent, the association reserve the right to expose this result in an effort to prevent clients from spending time and money on a product or service that cannot deliver what is claimed for it.

=== Eureka / Critical Thinking Prize ===
The Australian Museum Eureka Awards is a series of annual awards presented by the Australian Museum in partnership with their sponsors, for excellence in various fields. Until 2005 the Australian Skeptics were major sponsors of the award for critical thinking, which during this period was awarded to:

Year	Winner
1996	Trevor Case
1997	Amanda Barnier
1999	Melissa Finucane ∞
2000	Richard Kocsis
2001	Tim van Gelder
2002	Robert Morrison
2003	Brendan McKay
2004	Cheryl Capra
2005	David Henry & Amanda Wilson

∞ The 2000 Spring edition of The Skeptic magazine erroneously listed Richard Kocsis as the 1999 winner

After 2005 the Australian Skeptics decided to withdraw from the Eurekas, and award their own critical thinking Prize known as the Australian Skeptics Critical Thinking Prize. The winners are as follows:

Year	Winner
2006	Martin Bridgstock
2007	Kylie Sturgess
2008	Peter Ellerton

Both of these prizes have been discontinued.

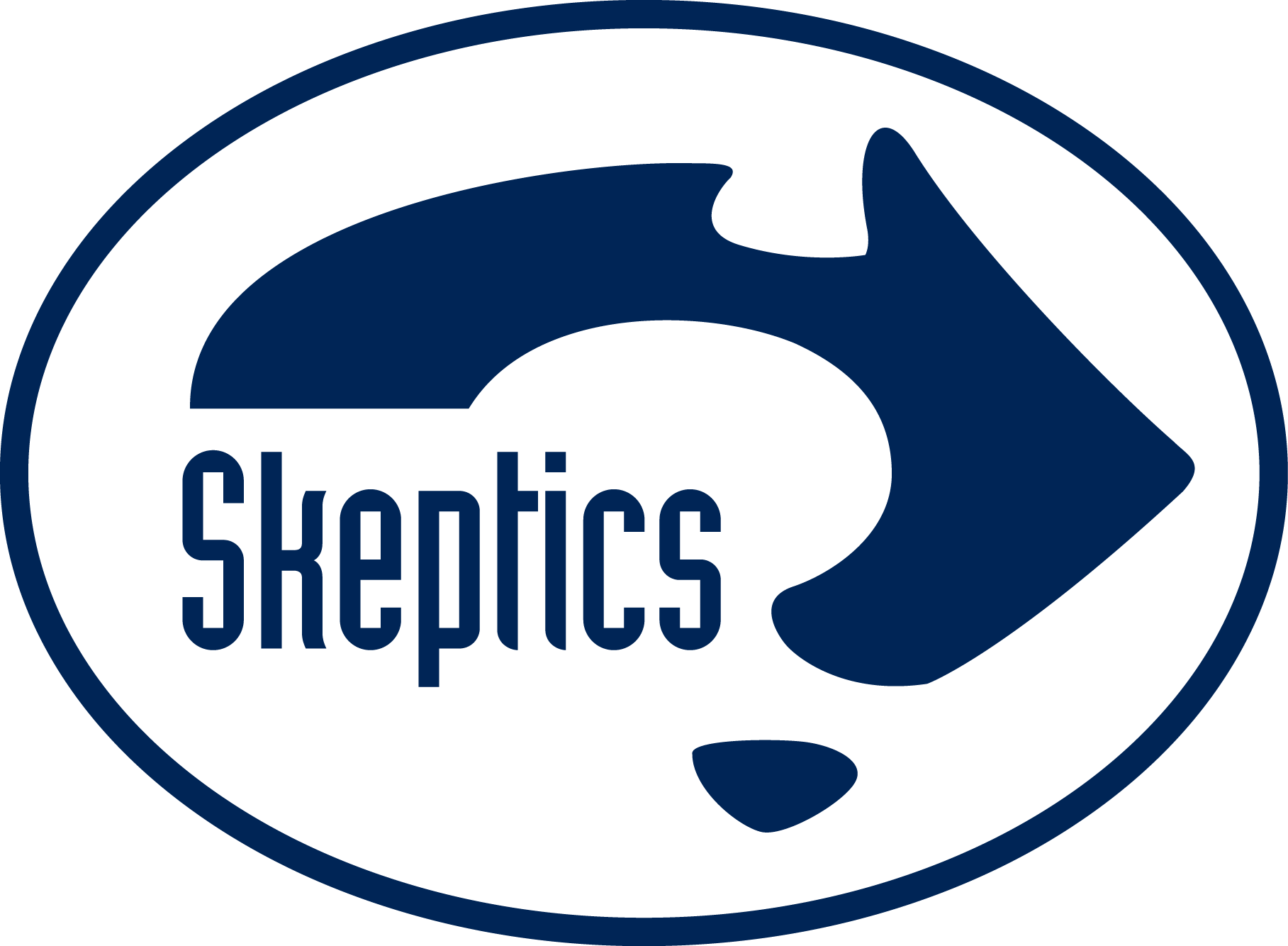
The map of Australia in the shape of a question mark was adopted as the official logo by the Australian Skeptics in 1996 and is a registered trademark image of the Australian Skeptics Inc. All Australian skeptical groups have been granted unconditional licence to use the image.

Australian Skeptics Inc. former president Eran Segev on the secrets of an effective skeptical organisation

== Regional and state groups ==
=== New South Wales ===
- Australian Skeptics Inc.
- Hunter Skeptics

=== Victoria ===
- Australian Skeptics (Victorian Branch) Inc.
- Ballarat Skeptics
- Borderline Skeptics Inc.
- Citizens for Science
- Great Ocean Road Skeptics
- Melbourne Eastern Hills Skeptics in the Pub
- Melbourne Skeptics
- Mordi Skeptics
- Young Australian Skeptics

=== Queensland ===
- Brisbane Skeptic Society Inc.
- Gold Coast Skeptics
- Queensland Skeptics Association Inc.

=== Australian Capital Territory ===
- Canberra Skeptics

=== Western Australia ===
- WA Skeptics
- Perth Skeptics

=== South Australia ===
- Skeptics SA
- Thinking and Drinking

=== Tasmania ===
- Hobart Skeptics
- Launceston Skeptics

=== Northern Territory ===
- Darwin Skeptics

== Past events ==
=== National conventions ===
The Australian Skeptics National Convention is the longest running annual skeptical convention, and has been held annually since 1985.

	Year	Dates	Location
39	2025	3-5 October	Melbourne
38	2024	23–25 November	Sydney
37	2023	2-3 December	Melbourne
36	2022	3-4 December	Canberra
35	2019	6-8 December	Melbourne (Carrillo Gantner Theatre, Carlton)
34	2018	13-14 October	Sydney (The Concourse, Chatswood)
33	2017	18–19 November	Sydney (City Recital Hall)
32	2016	25–27 November	Melbourne (University of Melbourne)
31	2015	16–18 October	Brisbane (QUT)
30	2014	28–30 November	Sydney (The Concourse, Chatswood)
29	2013	22–24 November	Canberra (CSIRO Discovery Centre)
28	2012	30 November – 2 December	Melbourne (Melbourne University)
27	2011	19 November (one-day event)	Sydney (Australian Museum)
26	2010	28–30 November	Sydney TAM Australia (Sydney Masonic Centre)
25	2009	27–29 November	Brisbane (University of Queensland)
24	2008	October	Adelaide (Norwood Town Hall)
23	2007	November	Hobart (University of Tasmania)
22	2006	November	Melbourne (Melbourne Museum)
21	2005	August	Gold Coast (Bond University)
20	2004	November	Sydney (University of Technology, Sydney)
19	2003	August	Canberra (CSIRO Discovery Centre)
18	2002	November	Melbourne (Melbourne University)
17	2001	November	Brisbane (West End Club)
16	2000	November	Sydney World Skeptics Convention III (Sydney University)
15	1999	November	Adelaide (Adelaide Convention Centre)
14	1998	October–November	Canberra (National Science & Technology Centre)
13	1997	August	Newcastle (Western Suburbs – Newcastle – Leagues Club)
12	1996	September	Melbourne (Monash University)
11	1995	June	Melbourne (Melbourne University)
10	1994	June	Sydney (Willoughby Town Hall)
9	1993	June	Melbourne (Melbourne University)
8	1992	June	Newcastle (Western Suburbs – Newcastle – Leagues Club)
7	1991	June	Sydney (Manly-Warringah Leagues Club)
6	1990	June	Melbourne (Holmesglen Conference Centre
5	1989	March	Canberra (National Science & Technology Centre)
4	1988	April	Sydney (Manly-Warringah Leagues Club)
3	1987	April	Canberra (Aust National University)
2	1986	March	Melbourne (Monash University)
1	1985	April	Sydney (Institution of Engineers)

=== No Answers in Genesis ===
No Answers in Genesis is a website affiliated with the Australian Skeptics organisation that provides information to defend the theory of evolution, and, more specifically, counter young Earth creationist arguments put forward by Answers in Genesis. It was founded by Australian atheist and skeptic John Stear, a retired civil servant. The website contains links, essays and other postings that rebut creationist arguments against evolution. Stear states that the site is meant for educational purposes as well as to illustrate the problems with young Earth creationism. The site also contains simple introductions to evolutionary concepts. It mainly has posts on creationism, but now has some essays on "intelligent design". It has two discussion boards.

In June 2005, members of the creationist group Answers in Genesis – Australia debated a team from the Australian Skeptics online on Margo Kingston's web diary section of the Sydney Morning Herald website.

=== Psychic hoaxes ===
In 1984 the Australian Skeptics brought magician Bob Steiner to Australia to pose as a psychic under the name "Steve Terbot". He went on The Bert Newton Show with Derryn Hinch who was in on the hoax, and accused him of being a charlatan. He also performed shows to live audiences in Melbourne and Sydney, pretending to be psychic. He later returned to the Bert Newton Show to reveal that he was a magician performing a hoax.

Later in February 1988 Richard Carleton, a reporter on the TV show 60 Minutes, brought James Randi back to Australia to oversee an elaborate hoax involving a fictional character named Carlos who was reported to be a 2,000-year-old entity who had last appeared in the body of a 12-year-old boy in Venezuela in 1900 was now manifesting through a young American art student named José Alvarez. In reality José had no special abilities, and was actually Randi's partner and assistant. The hoax involved the character Carlos appearing on various television shows in character and culminated in channel nine hosting a large media event at the Sydney Opera House where members from the Australian Skeptics were interviewed in front of a large audience of believers. The Australian Skeptics had not been made aware of the hoax until hours before it was revealed, a few days later, on 60 Minutes. There was outrage amongst the Australian media, to which Randi responded by pointing out that none of the journalists had bothered with even the most elementary fact-checking measures. There were some among the Australian Skeptics who took the view that this hoax had the potential of harming the good relationships that had been formed with certain media organisations, possibly discouraging them from reporting critically on similar stories in the future, and instead leaving such stories to other, less skeptical media organisations.

=== Historical investigations and demonstrations ===
Over the years the Australian Skeptics have conducted many investigations and demonstrations. Some examples are as follows:

==== Divining ====
In the early 1980s Dick Smith brought James Randi to Australia to conduct a test to determine whether those who conduct water divining have any real abilities. They laid out a grid of plastic irrigation pipes which were able to have water flowing or not flowing, and then challenged water diviners to determine which pipes contained the running water. Prior to the testing, the diviners agreed that the experimental conditions were suitable, however, when they were unable to display any ability, they changed their positions and blamed various external influences for preventing their success. This experiment was repeated several times beginning in 2001 using bottled water and bottled sand hidden within paper bags, with similar results.

==== Water powered car ====
In 1983 Ian Bryce and Mark Plummer investigated a patent filed for a "water powered car", designed by Stephen Horvath. The car was well publicised in the media of the day, and promoted by the then Premier of Queensland; Joh Bjelke-Petersen. The investigation concluded that the claim that the car was powered by nuclear fusion was not supported by evidence.

==== Psychic surgery ====
In 1981 when James Randi was visiting Australia he demonstrated how psychic surgery can be performed by sleight of hand with no actual surgery taking place. This was then later demonstrated again by the Australian Skeptics at a convention held in Sydney. The publicity from these demonstrations led to other forms of media, including the Australian Penthouse magazine publishing the story.

==== Fire walking ====
The Victorian Skeptics have demonstrated several times how firewalking or lying on a bed of nails can be achieved without any harm to the person. As publicity stunts they had various celebrities such as Steve Moneghetti, as well as committee members including Barry Williams, demonstrate fire walking, and then invited members of the public to repeat the stunt.

==== Telepathy ====
In 2010, a $100,000 prize challenger named Barrie Hill claimed to have the ability to transfer information by paranormal means, i.e. not through established communications or other physical means, from Australia to the USA. A test protocol was developed and agreed to by both parties. On test day, the Sydney "transmit" team assembled and was ready to execute the test, but in New York, the "receiver", known only as "Sue" and her lawyer "Jamie", did not show up to the agreed location. Hill claimed that they could not be reached by cell phone as they did not use them due to concerns over health. The test was eventually called off. After the first attempt, Hill explained that the receiver team was stuck in an elevator on the test date, and asked for another test. The investigation team insisted on speaking to the receiver, and asked the name. Hill replied it was "An Indian Spirit Guide."

==== Cold Fusion ====
On behalf of Australian entrepreneur Dick Smith, the Australian Skeptics performed an investigation of Andrea Rossi's Energy Catalyzer purported cold fusion generator. Several reviewers, including 2 nuclear physicists, had previously observed the device in operation and found it worth more study. Bryce's investigation postulated that extra energy was being added into the system through an unmetered earth ground wire.

==== Wine Card ====
In 2014 the Australian Skeptics investigated a product marketed by a Brisbane company known as the 'Premium Wine Card'. The device was the size of a credit card with holes punched in it that one would press against a glass when wine was poured in. The claim is that 'embedded frequencies' in the card improve the taste of wine, and was sold for about sixty-five dollars. Investigators devised an informal test using a placebo wine card, and placed both cards into identical envelopes, after which they invited participants to select which glass of wine was superior. The test was performed with two types of wine of differing price and with tap water. Sixty-six trials were performed. The results showed no correlation between use of the wine card on samples and the preference of the participants.

== Publications ==
=== The Skeptic magazine ===
The journal of the Australian Skeptics is called The Skeptic. The first issue of The Skeptic came out of Melbourne in January 1981, edited by Mark Plummer and produced by James Gerrand. The first issue was a black and white broadsheet tabloid. For many years the logo was the same logo as the American publication the Skeptical Inquirer only photocopied with the end chopped off. After that first issue, the format was reduced to a standard A4 publication produced on a typewriter. In the early days of the Australian Skeptics there was a strong focus on media and outreach, and the magazine ran a special column in each issue listing all media coverage for that period. After the national secretariat moved up to NSW in 1986, the production of the magazine was moved to the Sydney branch in 1987 with Tim Mendham as the new editor, and at this time the magazine was produced on a computer (a Macintosh) for the first time. About a year before the change, there was a competition held to choose a new logo for the Australian Skeptics, and this new logo was used in the magazines up until the 1990s. In 1988 for the first time the magazine was produced with a cover, showing the title and various art work, and for a few years after that the publication was produced in a different colour for each issue. In 1990 Tim Mendham stepped down as editor and Barry Williams took on the role, intending to only edit one issue in 1991, but then remaining in the role until 2008. Both Karen Stollznow and Steve Roberts were editors briefly in 2009, until editing was handed back to Tim Mendham in June 2009, and with whom it remained until the printed magazine stopped being published in 2025 and the magazine became an online only publication.

=== Books ===
The first big project that the Australian Skeptics undertook was in the 1980s when two scientists, Martin Bridgstock and Ken Smith, researched the various claims of creationism, and the Australian Skeptics, along with other authors, published a very successful book detailing their debunking of creationist claims. The book, titled Creationism: An Australian Perspective was first published 1986. At this time creationism was still being taught in science classes in some public schools in Queensland, but this research led to campaigns led by Martin Bridgstock, which resulted in creationism being removed from science classes. Ken Smith and Martin Bridgestock were both awarded the first life memberships in the Australian Skeptics at the 1986 convention for this service.

The Australian Skeptics also re-published the book Gellerism Revealed: The Psychology and Methodology Behind the Geller Effect by Ben Harris, originally published in 1985.

The Canberra Skeptics also published a book titled Skeptical which gave one- to two-page overviews of various skeptical topics.

=== Booklet ===
During the creationism in science classes debate, the Australian Skeptics attended a talk by a creationist geologist and collected various leaflets at that event. They responded to the leaflets by setting up a small sub-committee for the purpose of researching and responding to the various points raised in the creationist leaflets. The results of this research were published in a booklet in 1991 titled "Creationism-Scientists Respond".

== Skeptical Australian podcasts and radio programs ==
Independent and affiliated podcasts of a skeptical nature produced in Australia
Podcast	Host / creator	Dates	Details	Affiliation
Brains Matter	"The Ordinary Guy"	October 2006 to present	Brains Matter is a podcast discussion of science, trivia, history, curiosities and general knowledge.	
Diffusion Science Radio	Ian Woolf	November 1999 to present	Diffusion Science Radio is a weekly science and technology community radio show and podcast featuring a mix of new science, hard science, pop science, historical science and very silly science.	
Dr Karl's Great Moments in Science	Karl Kruszelnicki		Great Moments in Science is a short podcast featuring easy to understand explanations of interesting science topics and recent discoveries.	ABC Science
Einstein A Go-Go	Dr Shane		A discussion show about science.	3RRR
Hunting Humbug 101	Theo Clark	27 May 2014 to present	Hunting Humbug 101 is a biweekly podcast that examines logical fallacies using examples from the media, discussing pseudoscience, science misconceptions, politics, and philosophy.	Humbug! the eBook
The Imaginary Friends Show	Jake Farr-Wharton	8 February 2011 to present	The Imaginary Friends Show is a twice-weekly panel style podcast covering topics including science, skepticism, secularism, religion and politics, as well as irrational, illogical and dangerous posed beliefs.	Independent
Mysterious Universe	Aaron Wright and Benjamin Grundy	2006 to present	Mysterious Universe is a weekly podcasts covering issues and events that are strange, extraordinary, weird, wonderful and everything in between.	
Smart Enough To Know Better	Greg Wah and Dan Beeston	June 2010 to Dec 2025	Smart Enough to Know Better is a bi-weekly skeptical podcast including chat, sketches and interviews about science and skepticism.	
Reality Check	Tony Pitman	July 2009 to present	Reality Check is a radio show and podcast produced at the studios of JOY 94.9 FM in Melbourne. Each episode includes a round-up of LGBT world news and a movie review, along with a skeptical analysis of an issue related to pseudoscience, the paranormal or religion.	
Skeptically Challenged	Ross Balch	2 June 2013 to present	Skeptically Challenged a forum for exposing pseudoscience. It includes a regular podcast, combined with blogging and YouTube videos about issues in pseudoscience as well as the skeptic community at large and the promotion of scientific and critical thinking within the community.	Independent
Ockham's Razor	Robyn Williams		Ockham's Razor is a weekly radio program on ABC Radio National with short talks by researchers and people from industry with something thoughtful to say about science.	ABC Radio National
The Pseudoscientists	Jack Scanlan, Rachael Skerritt, Tom Lang, Sarah McBride and Elizabeth Riaikkenen	23 December 2008 to present	The Pseudoscientists is a panel discussion podcast covering topics including science, skepticism, news and pop-culture. It is created by the Young Australian Skeptics, who are a group of young Australian science communicators, professionals and students, with an interest in science, critical thinking, religion, education, politics, medicine, law, wider society, scientific skepticism and its cultural impact.	Young Australian Skeptics
Science on Mornings, on triple j	Zan Rowe and Karl Kruszelnicki		Science on Mornings, on triple j is a weekly science segment on Zan Rowe's morning radio show on triple j. The show's mission is to "bring science to the peeps" by answering listener questions with science.	ABC triple j
Science On Top	Ed Brown	10 February 2011 to present	A panel style podcast hosted by Ed Brown and including regular co-hosts Penny Dumsday, Shayne Joseph and Lucas Randall as well as guests and experts discussing science news in an in-depth yet casual style.	Independent
The Science Show	Robyn Williams	1975 to present	The Science Show is a weekly radio program on ABC Radio National which gives unique insights into the latest scientific research and debate.	ABC Radio National
The Skeptic Tank	Stefan Sojka and Richard Saunders	2001 to 2002	The Skeptic Tank started as a weekly radio programme on the internet radio station netFM in October 2001. The programme consisted of discussions on skeptical and science related topics, as well as guest interviews. Some regular guests were Peter Bowditch, Richard Lead and Helen Vnuk. 'The Skeptic Tank' stayed on netFM until October 2002.	Independent
The Skeptic Zone	Richard Saunders and Stefan Sojka	26 September 2008 to present	The Skeptic Zone podcast replaced The Tank Vodcast. Though still hosted by Saunders and Sojka, and featuring members of "The Tank", the podcast adopted a new format with clearly defined segments. Episodes usually feature an interview, or several shorter interviews, along with one or more regular segments. Though The Skeptic Zone originated with Saunders, long-time member of the Australian Skeptics, occasionally features members of the latter and their views are often aligned, the podcast is formally independent.	Independent
Sleek Geeks	Karl Kruszelnicki and Adam Spencer	26 June 2014 to present	Sleek Geeks is a geeky podcast by Adam Spencer and Dr Karl discussing the latest science news and events.	ABC Science
Token Skeptic	Kylie Sturgess	25 December 2009 to present	The Token Skeptic podcast was the first podcast produced by a solo female presenter in the social sciences category for skepticism on iTunes. In it Kylie Sturgess discusses, among other things, psychology, philosophy, ethics, science, critical thinking, literacy and education. The show includes interviews with international and Australian figures from pop-culture, science fiction, science communication, philosophy and more. The Token Skeptic is also featured on the radio programs Science for Skeptics on the 99.1FM station in Wisconsin, and on Skeptical Sundays for WPRR 1680AM Public Reality Radio in Michigan. Interviews from the Token Skeptic are regularly featured on the Skeptical Inquirer website Curiouser and Curiouser.	Independent
The Tank Vodcast (or The Tank Podcast)	Richard Saunders and Stefan Sojka	2005 to 2008	The Skeptic Tank was revived in 2005 as a podcast, and was in 2006 renamed The Tank Podcast. The podcast was produced and hosted by Richard Saunders, with Stefan Sojka as the co-host. The format remained much the same as The Skeptic Tank radio programme, but the podcasting format also made it possible to record segments, or entire episodes, out of the studio. In 2007 The Tank became a video podcast, and renamed The Tank Vodcast. Reporters for the vodcast include Jayson Cooke, Karen Stollznow, Kylie Sturgess and Michael Wolloghan.	Independent
Unfiltered Thoughts	Jack Scanlan	26 September 2013 to present	Unfiltered Thoughts is a discussion podcast where Jack Scanlan sits down with young people to discuss their main topic of interest and what they think about issues relating to science and skepticism over coffee in a Melbourne café.	Young Australian Skeptics

== Criticisms ==
There are claims the NSW Skeptics have over-reached in claiming the name 'Australian' skeptics, and also that supporters have no democratic standing, the group being akin to an 'invite only' gentlemen's club, amongst other criticisms about how they conduct themselves generally.
