= Barry Williams (skeptic) =

Australian skeptic (1938–2018)

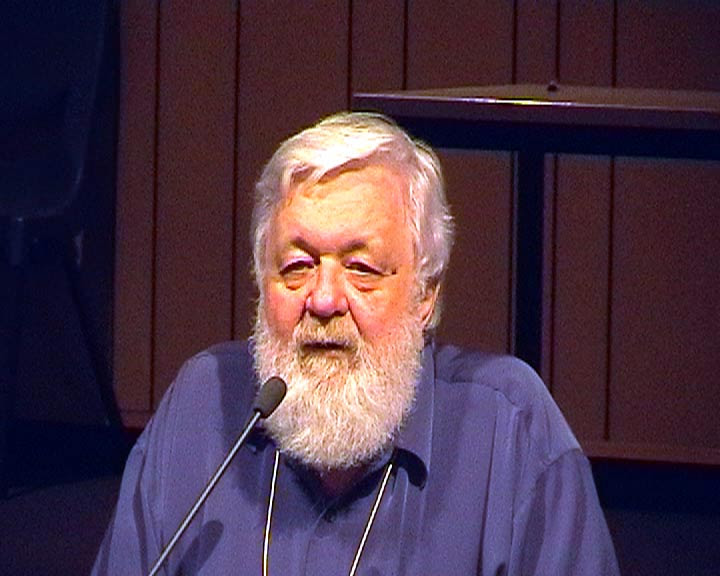
- Barry Williams speaking at an Australian Skeptics conference in the 2000s
- Born: 10 November 1938
- Died: 20 January 2018 (aged 79)
- Known for: Skeptical activism

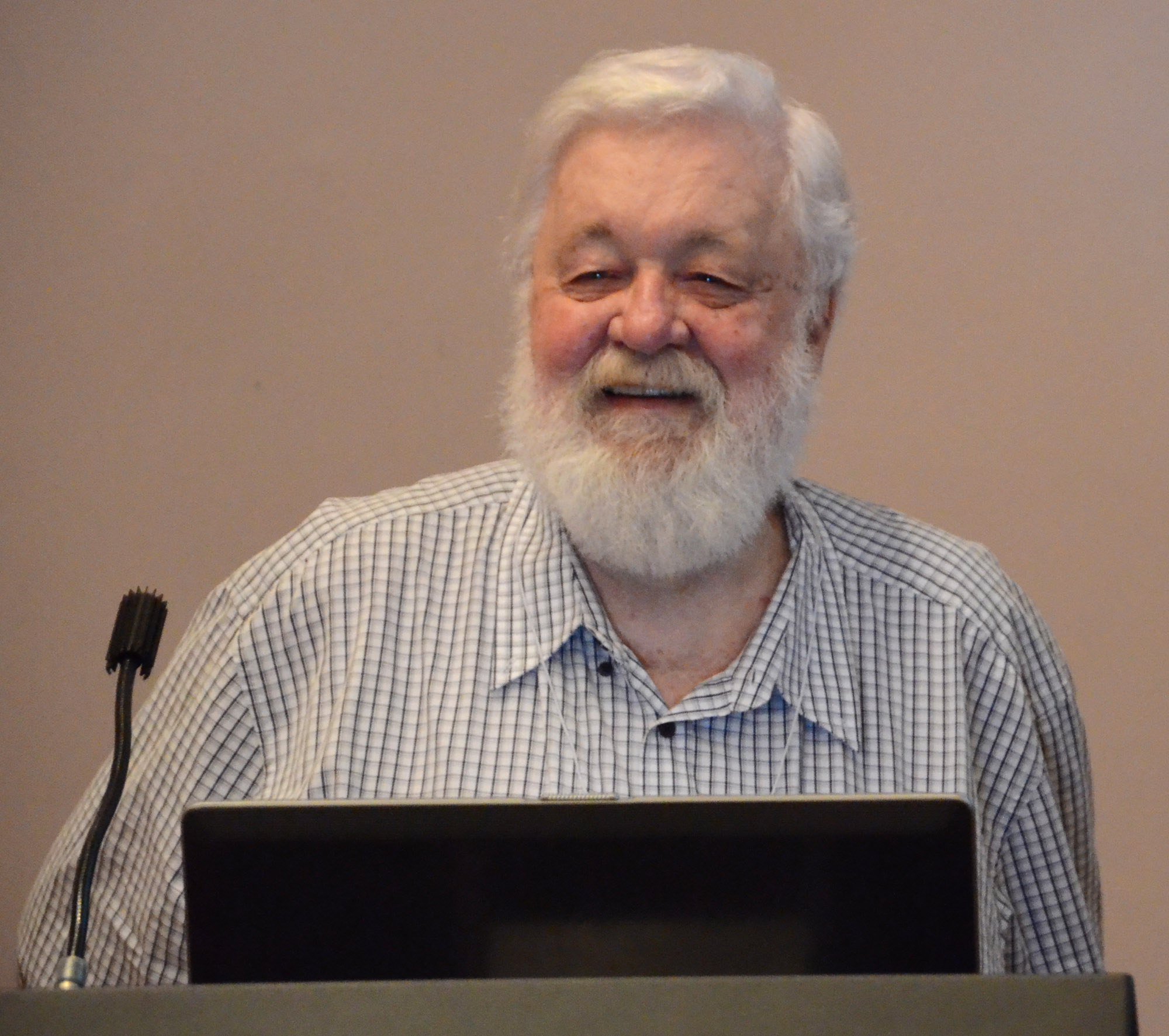
Barry Williams in 2011

Barry Justyn Williams (10 November 1938 – 20 January 2018) was a skeptic and writer, who was the president of the Australian Skeptics from 1986 until 1997. In 1997 he became the first paid Australian skeptic when he took on the role of Executive Officer of the Australian Skeptics. He was involved in many investigations of paranormal claims and the editor of The Skeptic magazine for 18 years. Williams was often called on by Australian media outlets for comments relating to paranormal claims.

== Life and career ==
Williams joined the Royal Australian Air Force (RAAF) and served in various places, including Butterworth and Williamtown. After leaving the RAAF, Williams worked for the US Department of Commerce in Sydney in sales and as an exhibition manager.

Williams served as Vice President of the North Sydney federal electorate conference for the Liberal Party. In 1979 he was part of an investigation of Dr. Paul Solomon, a candidate who had been pre-selected for the federal seat of North Sydney, who had made false claims in his pre-selection dossier.

In 1995 Williams became the first Executive Officer of the Australian Skeptics.

After several heart operations, Williams died on 20 January 2018, at the age of 79.

== Skeptical activism ==
Williams first realised that he was a skeptic when he read Chariots of the Gods?; he thought it was fascinating, until he read to the section about the pyramids. He is quoted as saying about the section "This is tripe". He later heard Dick Smith say in an interview that things like UFOs needed to be challenged; he wrote to Smith and said that if he got anything off the ground he was interested. Until then Williams thought that he was the only person who believed that such things did not exist. In 1980, Williams formed the New South Wales branch of the Australian Skeptics. In 1986, the head office of the Australian Skeptics moved to Sydney and Williams served as their president until 1996. In 1990, Williams took up the role of editor of The Skeptic magazine, and remained in that role for 18 years.

In 1995, the Australian Skeptics received a bequest which enabled them to create the position of executive officer. Williams relinquished his position of president and took up the full time position of executive officer in 1997, becoming the first paid employee of the Australian Skeptics.

During his time as president and executive officer of the Australian Skeptics, Williams appeared in various media outlets and became the face of Skepticism in Australia. He was often called on for comment about psychics, UFOs, ghosts, new age beliefs, creationism, and the "Energy Polarizer" of racing driver Peter Brock.

In 1993 Williams successfully "predicted" the winner of the Australian Federal election. He said that "the winner would have a campaign manager whose name had four letters, the second letter being "o" and the last two letters being identical." The Labor Party won the election under campaign manager Bob Hogg. Williams claimed a "double whammy" when, in 1996 the Liberal Party won the election under campaign manager Andrew Robb.

While editor of The Skeptic, Williams contributed to every edition of the magazine not only in an editorial role, but also a writer and investigator. His investigation "UFO was IPO" was cited in Martin Bridgstock's book Beyond Belief: Skepticism, Science and the Paranormal and described as a "rather elegant example" of using "scientific knowledge to explain paranormal phenomena".

Williams was a cricket fanatic and he wrote a piece on the "Devil's number, 87" in Australian cricket which was first published in the Australian Skeptic in 1993 and re-printed the Skeptic in March 2012. The piece was published in The Best Ever Australian Sports Writing: a 200 year collection.

In August 2018 the Australian Skeptics announced they would be presenting The Barry Williams Award for Skeptical Journalism in Williams' honour. The award recognises "the best piece of journalism (in any medium) that takes a critical and skeptical approach to a topic" within the scope of the Australian Skeptics, and has been nicknamed the Wallaby, after the nom-de-plume "Sir Jim R Wallaby" used by Williams in some of his more whimsical writing. The award carries a citation and a $AU2000 prize.

== See also ==
- Australian Skeptics
