= HEART Party =

Australian conspiracy political party

Health, Environment, Accountability, Rights, Transparency
- Abbreviation: HEART
- Leader: Michael O'Neill
- Secretary: Michael O'Neill
- Founded: 26 October 2016; 10 years ago
- Registered: 26 October 2016; 10 years ago
- Merger of: Health Australia Party; Informed Medical Options Party
- Preceded by: Informed Medical Options Party; Involuntary Medication Objectors Party
- Headquarters: Bellbrook, New South Wales
- Ideology: Anti-vaccination; Anti-fluoridation

Website
- heartparty.com.au

Health, Environment, Accountability, Rights, Transparency (HEART) is a minor Australian political party registered federally and in New South Wales. The party supports alternative medicine, COVID-19 scepticism, climate change scepticism, and opposes mandatory vaccination and water fluoridation. The party's rhetoric has often been described as unscientific by authorities, who have stated the party spreads misinformation.

The party was founded as the Involuntary Medication Objectors (Vaccination/Fluoride) Party, before later renaming to the Informed Medical Options Party (IMOP). The party's leader is Michael O'Neill, husband of barred (in Australia), alternative medicine promoter Barbara O'Neill. Rebecca McCredie is its deputy registered officer.

In August 2023, IMOP attempted to merge with the Health Australia Party (HAP) to become HEART, with HAP subsequently backing out from the merger and later dissolving. HEART was previously registered in Queensland, but voluntarily deregistered on 9 February 2024. The party was also previously deregistered at the federal level between August 2024 and February 2025, as it failed to demonstrate required minimum membership at the time.

== History ==
The Involuntary Medication Objectors (Vaccination/Fluoride) Party was first registered at the federal level by the Australian Electoral Commission (AEC) on 26 October 2016. Its registered officer was Gary Martin at the time of registration.

Between 2019 and 2020, the Involuntary Medication Objectors (Vaccination/Fluoride) Party applied to rename itself to the Informed Medical Options Party at the federal level.

The party is regularly described as "anti-vax", including by former federal health minister Greg Hunt, which its founder has described as "insulting". National peak medical organisation, the Australian Medical Association, also describes the party as spreading health misinformation and that the group's positions "lack the backing of scientific evidence".

=== Rebranding to the Informed Medical Options Party ===
On 4 December 2019, the Involuntary Medication Objectors (Vaccination/Fluoride) Party applied to the AEC to be renamed to the "Informed Medical Options Party". The AEC received 27 written objections to the proposed name change, including from then-federal health minister, Greg Hunt. Most objections centred around the use of the term "Medical" and concerns that it would infer the party was based on medical evidence/science, and the chance of being confused with the Australian Medical Association. The AEC rejected the objections on the basis that the term did not meet the legislative criteria required to refuse the application.

On 22 April 2020, the party was officially was renamed to the Informed Medical Options Party at the federal level.

IMOP applied to the Electoral Commission of Queensland (ECQ) to change its name to HEART on 15 December 2023, and officially was renamed on 19 January 2024.

As of 2 September 2024, IMOP has been formally renamed to the HEART Party and is listed on the New South Wales register of political parties.

=== Merger with the Health Australia Party and rebranding to HEART ===
The party announced that HAP would merge into IMOP in a Facebook video, with both parties saying the decision to merge was made after a "long period of negotiations" and due to their similar policies. However, HAP withdrew from the merger on 10 October, a week after IMOP rebranded to HEART. HAP proceeded to collapse and was deregistered nationally.

The Informed Medical Options Party was rebranded to HEART by the:

- Australian Electoral Commission for federal elections, on 3 October 2023
- Electoral Commission of Queensland for Queensland state and local elections, on 19 January 2024
- New South Wales Electoral Commission for New South Wales state and local elections

=== 2024–25 deregistration at the federal level ===
On 20 April 2023, the Australian Electoral Commission initiated a review of the HEART Party requiring the party to submit a list of members. Australian federal law requires political parties to have at least 1,500 party members, or have a representative in parliament, to remain registered. After several extensions, HEART provided a list of 1,533 members to the AEC. After the Commission removed deceased members and duplicate listings, a random sample of the list were contacted to verify their membership following Australian Bureau of Statistics methodology. Of a random sample of 33 people, 3 declined membership of the party resulting in the test failing to meet the standard threshold. The AEC subsequently issued a notice to the party on 13 December 2023.

On 12 January 2024, HEART provided a written response to the AEC claiming it had over 7,000 members, but was unable to provide evidence of such. HEART submitted an amended list of 1,601 names. After removing further deceased peoples and duplicates, a random sample was again selected and contacted. Five of the 27 people contacted denied their membership, ultimately resulting in the AEC formally deregistering HEART on 26 August 2024 under federal electoral laws.

In September 2024, the party requested a review of the AEC's previous deregistration decision, providing another version of a membership list. HEART protested that the assurance process was "onerous, not fit-for-purpose and creates obstacles" which inhibited the party's political participation, and did not provide the party with enough time to prepare the required membership lists. The updated membership list included 1,650 people, of which 31 people were screened out as duplicates or deceased. A repeat random verification of 53 listings were completed, of which one only person denied membership, ultimately meeting the threshold required to demonstrate minimum membership. As a result, the AEC set aside its previous deregistration decision and HEART was restored on the Register of Political Parties on 4 February 2025.

=== Deregistration in Queensland ===
On 25 January 2024, the deputy registered officer of HEART submitted an application to the ECQ requesting that it cancel the registration of the party. The ECQ approved the deregistration of the party on 9 February 2024.

== Policies and political positions ==
The HEART Party positions itself as a party advocating for individual choice, government transparency, and holistic health practices. Its platform emphasises personal autonomy, environmental sustainability, and accountability in governance.

=== Core Principles ===
Health:

- Advocates for full autonomy over health decisions, opposing coercion in medical procedures.
- Supports holistic and natural treatments, mental health care incorporating complementary medicine, and a fluoride-free water supply.
- Promotes lifestyle choices that strengthen immunity, such as organic food consumption and small-scale food production.

Environment:

- Endorses independent, balanced scientific reviews of environmental policies. Supports clean and efficient energy production, transparency on renewable energy impacts, and regenerative farming practices like permaculture.
- Opposes hazardous substances and calls for reviews of commercial farming and mining practices.

Accountability & Rights:

- Seeks greater transparency in government decisions, including disclosure of conflicts of interest.
- Advocates for a Federal Bill of Rights to protect freedoms such as speech, association, religion, movement, privacy, and medical choice.
- Calls for reassessment of foreign trade agreements and challenges Australia’s alignment with WHO and UN directives.

=== Political Positions ===
- Strongly opposes mandatory vaccination and water fluoridation; promotes informed consent and skepticism toward pharmaceutical regulation.
- Supports a Royal Commission into the government’s pandemic response and regulatory bodies’ roles.
- Calls for balance regarding mainstream climate change narratives and for consideration of diverse academic perspectives.

== Electoral results ==
=== Federal elections ===
The party was first registered for federal elections on 26 October 2016. HEART was deregistered between 26 August 2024 as it failed on two occasions to meet minimum membership requirements, and was re-registered on 2 February 2025 following a third appeal.

The party first ran in the 2019 Australian federal election as the Involuntary Medication Objectors (Vaccination/Fluoride) Party. It received 1,179 primary votes for the House of Representatives (0.01%), and 17,055 primary votes for the Senate (0.12%). It did not result in any parliamentary representation.

The party ran again in the 2022 Australian federal election, this time as the Informed Medical Options Party. It received 25,850 primary votes for the House of Representatives (0.18%), and 48,830 primary votes for the Senate (0.32%). It did not result in any parliamentary representation.

=== Queensland elections ===
The Informed Medical Options Party has only run in one Queensland election - the 2020 Queensland state election. The party did not win any seats, gaining 17,646 primary votes (first preference) or 0.61% of all votes. The party has since collapsed in Queensland and voluntarily deregistered.

=== New South Wales elections ===
The "HEART" acronym was first used by IMOP at the 2023 New South Wales state election, although the party continued to be registered as the Informed Medical Options Party at the time. The party received 11,529 primary votes, accounting for 0.25% of all primary votes in the State. No members were elected to parliament.

== See also ==
- Barbara O'Neill – wife of founder Michael O'Neill and alternative medicine promoter
