= Young Australian Skeptics =

Organization

- Formation: 2008; 18 years ago
- Location: Melbourne, Australia
- Founder: Elliot Birch
- Editors: Elliot Birch; Richard Hughes; Belinda Nicholson; Jack Scanlan
- Website: youngausskeptics.com

The Young Australian Skeptics (YAS) is an Australian skeptical organisation whose primary focus is its collaborative blog, which attempts to address topics central to science, critical thinking and scientific skepticism. The group has published a Skeptical Blog Anthology Book reviewed in Scientific American, and has been represented in national broadcast media in Australia and North America, skeptically addressing conspiracy theories, as well as discussing topics specific to young members of the skeptical movement.

== Overview ==
The Young Australian Skeptics (YAS) organisation was founded in 2008 by Elliot Birch, with its web site functioning "as an experimental community-style blog." They have been described in a guest post at Scientific American as "an affiliation of skeptically-minded people, primarily college students, scientists and artists living in the city of Melbourne." The group caters specifically to young people, defined as individuals who are in the age range "from high school to maybe late 20s," according to editor Jack Scanlan.

In 2009, the Young Australian Skeptics began an anthology project, compiling a list of skeptical blogs based on nominations from users, initially including "blog entries posted between January 1 and December 1, 2009," according to a 2009 article in Skeptical Inquirer. In 2012, the Skeptical Blog Anthology book was made available as a print collection of reader-nominated articles and essays, edited by Kylie Sturgess.

The Young Australian Skeptics assumed a leadership role in promoting the activities of Freethought University Alliance groups at The Amaz!ng Meeting Australia 2010 (TAMOz), interviewing "current leaders in skepticism such as Eugenie C. Scott and Simon Singh," as reported in Skeptical Inquirer by Sturgess.

== The Pseudoscientists ==
The Pseudoscientists
- Genre: Science, skeptic, interview
- Running time: approximately one hour
- Country of origin: Australia
- Language: English
- Hosted by: Tom Lang; Sarah McBride; Belinda Nicholson; Jack Scanlan; Rachael Skerritt
- Original release: 2008
- Audio format: Mono
- Podcast: youngausskeptics.com/podcasts/the-pseudoscientists

The Pseudoscientists is the weekly official podcast of the Young Australian Skeptics, which aims to explore issues pertaining to science, critical thinking while engaging young skeptics with science communicators.

As reported in an April 2009 article in The Age, the podcast "rank[ed] higher on the Australian iTunes chart than similar offerings from the BBC, the CSIRO and NASA" within its first four months after launching.

The show format typically spans over an hour in length per episode, and "includes interviews, book reviews, and other segments."

== Media appearances ==
In July 2009, Alastair Tait represented the Young Australian Skeptics on 702 ABC Sydney in an interview with Nick Rheinberger about the group's investigation into Moon landing conspiracy theories. In the interview, Tait addressed several specific claims about the Moon landing, including explaining the effect of torque on the flag as it was planted, discussing the types of radiation (beta particles) that the astronauts would be exposed to while traveling through the Van Allen Belt, the transparent by-product of lunar module thrusters, the lack of visible stars photographed in a light-saturated landscape, and several other popular hoax theories. Tait followed up by pointing audience members to recently taken photographs taken of the lunar landing site by NASA's Lunar Reconnaissance Orbiter, whose mission was in progress during the interview.

A May 2010 episode of the Skeptically Speaking radio show based in Edmonton, Canada featured Young Australian Skeptics' Jack Scanlan, Elliot Birch, and Jason Ball. In dialog with host Desiree Schell, the YAS representatives discussed issues that face young members of the skeptical movement, including their role in the larger skeptical community and relating to peers who might be more credulous.

== Publications ==
- Kylie Sturgess, ed. (16 August 2012). Skeptical Blog Anthology. Young Australian Skeptics.

== See also ==
- Australian Skeptics
- Notable Skeptics and Skeptical Organizations
- Pseudoscience
- Quackery
