= Kylie Sturgess =

Educator, skeptic, podcaster

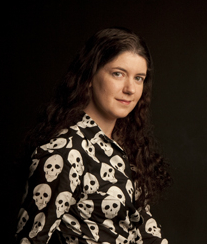
- Citizenship: Australian
- Occupations: Educator; lecturer; podcaster
- Years active: 2003 – present
- Known for: Notable sceptic and host of the Token Skeptic Podcast, covering topics such as psychology, philosophy, science, scepticism, ethics, literacy, education, atheism, and critical thinking.
- Awards: CBAA Community Radio Award, best radio program Talks 2018; Three-Minute Thesis final eight finalist in the Asia-Pacific Virtual Showcase, 2020.
- Website: http://www.kyliesturgess.com/ Kylie Sturgess Voice recorded in January 2014

Kylie Sturgess is a past President of the Atheist Foundation of Australia, an award-winning blogger, author and independent podcast host of The Token Skeptic Podcast. A Philosophy and Religious Education teacher with over ten years experience in education, Sturgess has lectured on teaching critical thinking, feminism, new media and anomalistic beliefs worldwide. She is a Member of the James Randi Educational Foundation (JREF) Education Advisory Panel and regularly writes editorial for numerous publications, and has spoken at The Amazing Meeting Las Vegas, Dragon*Con (US), QED Con (UK). She was a presenter and Master of Ceremonies for the 2010 Global Atheist Convention and returned to the role in 2012. Her most recent book The Scope of Skepticism was released in 2012. She is a presenter at Perth's community radio station RTRFM, and a winner at the 2018 CBAA Community Radio Awards in the category of Talks, with the show Talk the Talk In 2020 she was in the final eight in the Three-Minute Thesis (3MT) Asia-Pacific virtual showcase.

== Influences ==
From a young age Sturgess was influenced by art, literature, and film. Her interest in investigative journalism exposed her to the negative results of scams and pseudoscience. Sturgess also credits the feminist writer Julie Burchill and popular science writer Mary Roach as being positive influences. Female skeptics Karen Stollznow and Lynne Kelly are also important figures in Sturgess's skepticism background.

== Career ==
Since 2003, Sturgess has gained Levels 1 and 2 accreditation in the Federation of Australasian Philosophy in Schools Association's ‘Philosophy / Teacher Educator’. She went on to begin a Graduate Diploma in Psychology at Monash University by distance education in 2006 and completed several Masters Degrees in Education and qualifications in Radio Broadcasting.

At the beginning of 2007 Sturgess had completed her first Masters of Education in Special Learning needs, with a particular focus on Gifted and Talented education and gender issues. For the final unit for her second Masters of Education, her thesis was on "Anomalistic beliefs in Australians : a Rasch analysis", and she was a co-author on a paper raising questions about the Wiseman and Watt’s short scales of positive and negative superstitions.

Her professional background includes working for a number of private schools in Western Australia. In 2010 Sturgess taught Religious Education, Philosophy and Ethics. Currently, she is a lecturer at Murdoch University in Strategic Communication, Podcasting and Radio, whilst completing her PhD in podcasting and further graduate studies in Science Communication at ANU.

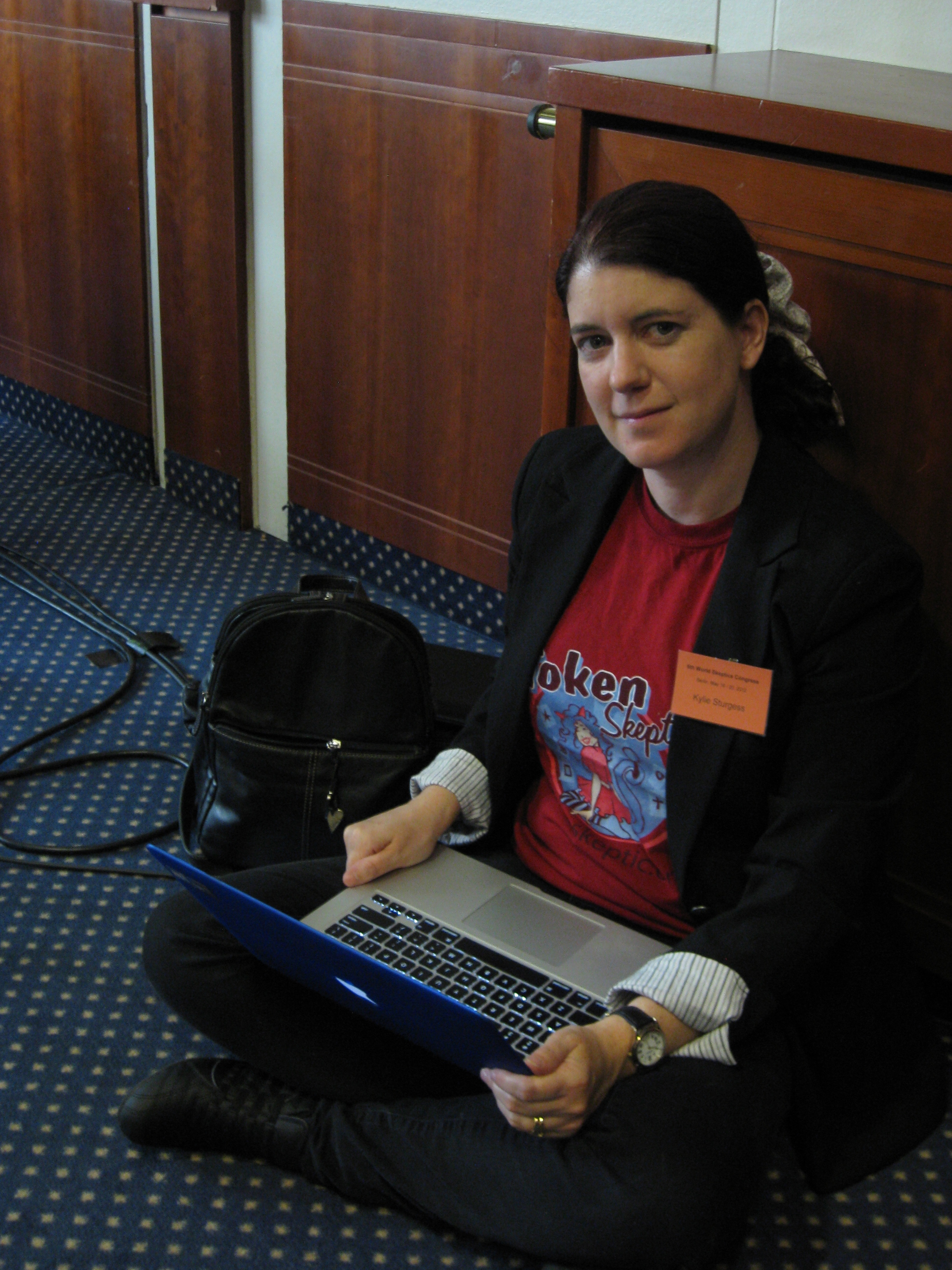
6th World Skeptic Congress, 2012, Berlin "Why Can't a Teacher Be More Like a Scientist? – Pseudoscience in Education"

== Skepticism and speaking engagements ==
Sturgess' influence in skepticism began during The Amazing Meeting 3 where she helped as a volunteer. At the beginning of 2006, after an influential lecture on 'Teaching Critical Thinking in the Physical Sciences' by Liam McDaid of Sacramento City College, the West Australian Skeptic Association ran an Award for challenging pseudo-scientific and paranormal claims. Sturgess used this opportunity as a 'theme' for her Term 2 upper-ability English class (along with studies of Macbeth, GATTACA and The Chrysalids) who subsequently submitted six group reports. The class was commended with two awards and one honourable mention; later repeated in 2007 with two Awards and three honourable mentions.

Sturgess was recognised for this work by a runner-up award by the Australian Skeptics in 2006. At that conference, she presented a speech written by the West Australian Skeptics regarding their project and their request for support. As a result, she was invited to present an essay for Radio National in December 2006, which also became an article in the Australian Skeptics. When she won the Australian Skeptics Critical Thinking Prize in 2007, she used the proceeds to begin her Graduate Diploma in Psychology.

Sturgess was a presenter of a paper at the James Randi Educational Foundation's The Amazing Meeting 5, with the title "The West Australian Skeptics Awards for Young Critical Writers: Investigations and Questions about Future Directions when Studying High School Students’ Beliefs in the Pseudoscientific and the Paranormal.". In 2008 she presented at the Australian Skeptics National Conference in Adelaide, South Australia with "On Sex, Smarts and Where The SkepGrrls At: An Investigation into Gender Differences and Belief In Weird Things".

She has been a speaker on a number of panels on the SkepTrack at Dragon*Con from 2009 to 2011 and in 2010 spoke at Global Atheist Convention, Melbourne 12–14 March 2010 on "Sex and Skepticism: a Study of Belief in Australian Women". and presented on a panel at the QED Convention 2011 in Manchester, UK, called 'Reaching Out Reasonably’ with Eugenie Scott, Sile Lane, David Kirby, and moderated by Janis Bennion.

In 2011, Sturgess was the Australian co-ordinator of the 10:23 campaign and was recognised with First Place for 2011 for her activism efforts by the Secular Student Alliance Best Individual College Activist Awards. She has acted as a consultant to the media on the topic of women and paranormal beliefs for the Australian National Times column "Skeptic Science". In 2016 she promoted the Census No Religion Campaign as the President of the Atheist Foundation of Australia

== Publications ==
- Sturgess, Kylie (2012). The Scope of Skepticism: Interviews, Essays and Observations From the Token Skeptic Podcast. Podblack Books. ISBN 978-1-291-00501-1.

Sturgess regularly writes editorials for numerous publications, including:

- The Australian Skeptics,
- UK Skeptic,
- Skeptical Briefs,
- Skeptical Inquirer, and the
- Committee for Skeptical Inquiry’s (CSI) 'Curiouser and Curiouser' online column.
- Independent Investigation Group's The Odds Must be Crazy website

Sturgess' work has featured in Educational Journals and Publications:

- The Open Laboratory Best Of Science Blogs 2008
- Journal of the Science Teachers Association of Western Australia,
- Lab Talk – Science Teachers Association of Victoria,

Other notable publications:

- The Young Australian Skeptics Skeptical Blog Anthology 2011 – Editor
- Sturgess was a co-author of the paper ‘The structure of superstitious action – A further analysis of fresh evidence‘, in the journal Personality and Individual Differences (Science Direct), a peer-reviewed publication. It involves a re-analysis of Wiseman and Watt's short scales of positive and negative superstitions.
- Essay featured in "The Australian Book of Atheism", distributed in Australia by Embiggen Books.
- Cavanagh, R., Kennish, P., & Sturgess, K. (2008). Development of a theoretical framework to inform measurement of secondary school student engagement with learning. AARE 2008 International Education Research Conference. Changing Climates: Education for Sustainable Futures, 30 November 2008. Brisbane: AARE Inc.
- What Do I Do Next?: Leading Skeptics Discuss 105 Practical Ways to Promote Science and Advance Skepticism. Ed. Daniel Loxton, www.skeptic.com.
- Sturgess, K. ‘Skepticism in the Classroom‘ in Knight, S. & Collins, C. (Eds.). (2005). Critical and Creative Thinking: The Australasian Journal of Philosophy in Education, 13(1).
- Order, Simon; Gail Phillips; Lauren O’Mahony and Kylie Sturgess. (2021). “The Vision Impaired as a Radio Audience: Meeting Their Audio Needs in the 21st Century”, Journal of Radio & Audio Media, 28:1, 107-124.
- Bridgstock, M., Marais, I. and Sturgess, K. (2011). The structure of superstitious action – A further analysis of fresh evidence. Personality and Individual Differences 50(6):795–798.

== Awards ==
- Three-Minute Thesis final eight finalist in the Asia-Pacific Virtual Showcase, 2020.
- Best Radio Program – Talks at the 2018 CBAA Community Radio Awards with Talk the Talk
- Ockham Award – Best Video 2014 for TEDxPerth Talk "Superstition Ain't The Way" Awarded at OED 2014 by The Skeptic Magazine UK
- Ockham Award – Best Podcast 2013 for The Token Skeptic. Awarded at OED 2013 by The Skeptic Magazine UK
- The Secular Student Alliance Best Individual College Activist Awards – First Place 2011
- Australian Skeptics Critical Thinking Prize 2007
- Australian Skeptics Runner-up For Critical Thinking Prize 2006

== Interviews ==
Sturgess has featured in the following media:

=== Television ===
- "The Story Behind Superstitions" – Channel 10 Breakfast – Friday 13 July 2012.

=== Radio ===
- ABC Darwin
- Radio National
- JJJ
- 3AW
- Skeptically Speaking
- 6PR
- Fremantle Radio
- Curtin University Radio
- RTRFM

=== Podcasts ===
- Skepticality Podcast
- Meet the Skeptics
- Skeptically Speaking
- The Skeptical Experience (UK)
- Birmingham Skeptics (UK)
- Strange Quarks
- The Pseudo Scientists
