= Willard Fuller =

American faith healer

Willard Fuller (1915 – April 8, 2009) was an American faith healer and proponent of psychic dentistry.

== Career ==
Fuller was born in Grant Parish, Louisiana. In 1946 he graduated in theology at the Southern Baptist Theological Seminary. He formed his own healing ministry known as the Lively Stones World Healing Fellowship. He worked in Palatka, Florida.

It was alleged that Fuller could cause dental fillings to appear spontaneously, change silver into golden fillings, straighten crooked teeth or produce new teeth. However, magicians and skeptics have found these claims dubious, unsupported by any solid evidence. One dentist examined some patients of Fuller. In one case miraculous gold fillings turned out to be tobacco stains. In another case a female patient who reported a miraculous new silver filling admitted she had forgotten that the filling was already there.

Science writer Kurt Butler has written:

As explained by James Randi in The Faith Healers, he convinces many that the miracles happen because people aren't very observant about their own teeth, regular amalgam can appear yellowish with a dim flashlight, and because they want to believe. When they later realize that no miracle occurred, Fuller's circus has left town or they are too embarrassed to complain, or they blame their lack of faith for the fading and erasure of the miracle."

Fuller was once convicted of fraud in Australia for practicing dentistry without a license.

Science writer Terence Hines has written that Fuller was "nothing more than a practitioner of sleight of hand."
