= Health Care Complaints Commission =

Statuory body in Australia

- Established: 1994
- Jurisdiction: New South Wales
- Location: Sydney, New South Wales, Australia
- Motto: Aims to protect public health and safety by resolving, investigating and prosecuting complaints against health service providers
- Authorised by: Health Care Complaints Act 1993 (NSW)
- Type of tribunal: Statutory authority
- Website: www.hccc.nsw.gov.au

Commissioner
- Currently: Sue Dawson
- Since: December 2015
- Lead position ends: December 2025

The New South Wales Health Care Complaints Commission (commonly referred to as the 'HCCC'), is an independent statutory body created by the Parliament of New South Wales, Australia to receive, assess, resolve or prosecute complaints relating to health service providers in New South Wales. The HCCC plays a unique role in maintaining the integrity of the NSW health care system by receiving and assessing complaints about health service providers in NSW. These may be:

- Registered health practitioners, including medical practitioners, nurses and dental practitioners
- Unregistered health practitioners, such as naturopaths, massage therapists and alternative health providers
- Health organisations, such as public and private hospitals and medical centres

The Act requires that public health and safety are the paramount considerations in all of the HCCC’s regulatory functions.

== Purpose ==
Established in 1994, the HCCC independently deals with complaints about health service providers in NSW by assessing and resolving complaints wherever possible. The HCCC also investigates and prosecutes serious complaints. The HCCC works closely with the health professional councils in NSW when handling complaints to ensure the best possible protection of the public health and safety.

The Health Care Complaints Act 1993 (NSW) defines the scope of the HCCC's work, which is to:

- receive and assess complaints relating to health service providers in NSW;
- resolve or assist in the resolution of complaints;
- investigate serious complaints that raise questions of public health and safety; and
- prosecute serious complaints.

For the most serious complaints, the HCCC can determine that:

- the complaint should be investigated
- the complaint should be referred to a more appropriate regulatory body
- the complaint should be referred to the Police or Director of Public Prosecution

For registered practitioners, the assessment will consider care, treatment and practitioner’s conduct with regard to the standards, guidelines and codes of conduct that apply to each profession and their legal obligations. When a complaint is about a registered health practitioner, the HCCC must consult with the relevant professional council before determining a complaint outcome.

For unregistered practitioners, the assessment will consider care, treatment and conduct with regard to the Code of Conduct for Unregistered Health Practitioners (the Code) and their legal obligations. The Code sets the minimum practice and ethical standards with which Unregistered health service providers are required to comply and also informs consumers about what they can expect from practitioners.

For health organisations, their legal obligations and the policies and systems that are in place to ensure the safety and quality of health service delivery are considered in the assessment process.

=== Investigation powers ===
The HCCC must investigate a complaint if the complaint raises a significant risk to public health or safety, or serious questions about the care provided to a patient. For individual providers, the HCCC will investigate a complaint if the allegations would provide grounds for disciplinary action is proved. For health organisations, the investigation will consider whether critical and systemic issues are identified, and if so, make recommendations to the organisation to assist with remediating the issues.

=== Prosecution powers ===
Following an investigation into a registered health provider, where a significant departure in clinical care and treatment and/or professional conduct has been established, the complaint may be referred internally to the Director of Proceedings (DoP), the head of the HCCC’s Legal Department.

The DoP determines whether disciplinary action is warranted, and if so, whether the prosecution should be before a Professional Standards Committee or the NSW Civil and Administrative Tribunal (NCAT). The Director of Proceedings determines the most appropriate forum for disciplinary proceedings taking into account:

- the evidence gathered during the investigation
- the nature of the complaint
- the likely outcomes

=== General proceedings ===
In conducting all prosecutions and other legal proceedings, the Commission acts with complete propriety, fairness and in accordance with the highest professional standards.

For unregistered practitioners, the HCCC has full jurisdiction and determination over the complaint outcome. In these scenarios, the HCCC may make a prohibition order which may be interim (for a period of 8 weeks) or permanent. A prohibition order is a serious outcome as it legally prevents the practitioner from providing health services (or a specific health service). A full list of prohibition orders can be found on the HCCC’s website.

The HCCC may also make a public statement that identifies and gives warnings or information about an unregistered health practitioner and their health services. A full list of public warnings/statements can be found on the HCCC’s website.

The HCCC receives media attention when it has played a role in the investigation or prosecution of high profile complaints, or complaints that are in the public interest. Data published by the HCCC shows a continual year on year increase in the number of complaints received, often attributed by the media to a health system under pressure. Other media attention included a criticism of its performance by The Sydney Morning Herald, reporting that new "statistics expos[ed] a dramatic decline in investigations despite complaints from the public being at an all-time high."

A full list of the HCCC's Annual Reports, outlining yearly complaint activity is publicly available on its website.
