= Lynne Kelly (science writer) =

Australian science writer

Lynne Kelly AM
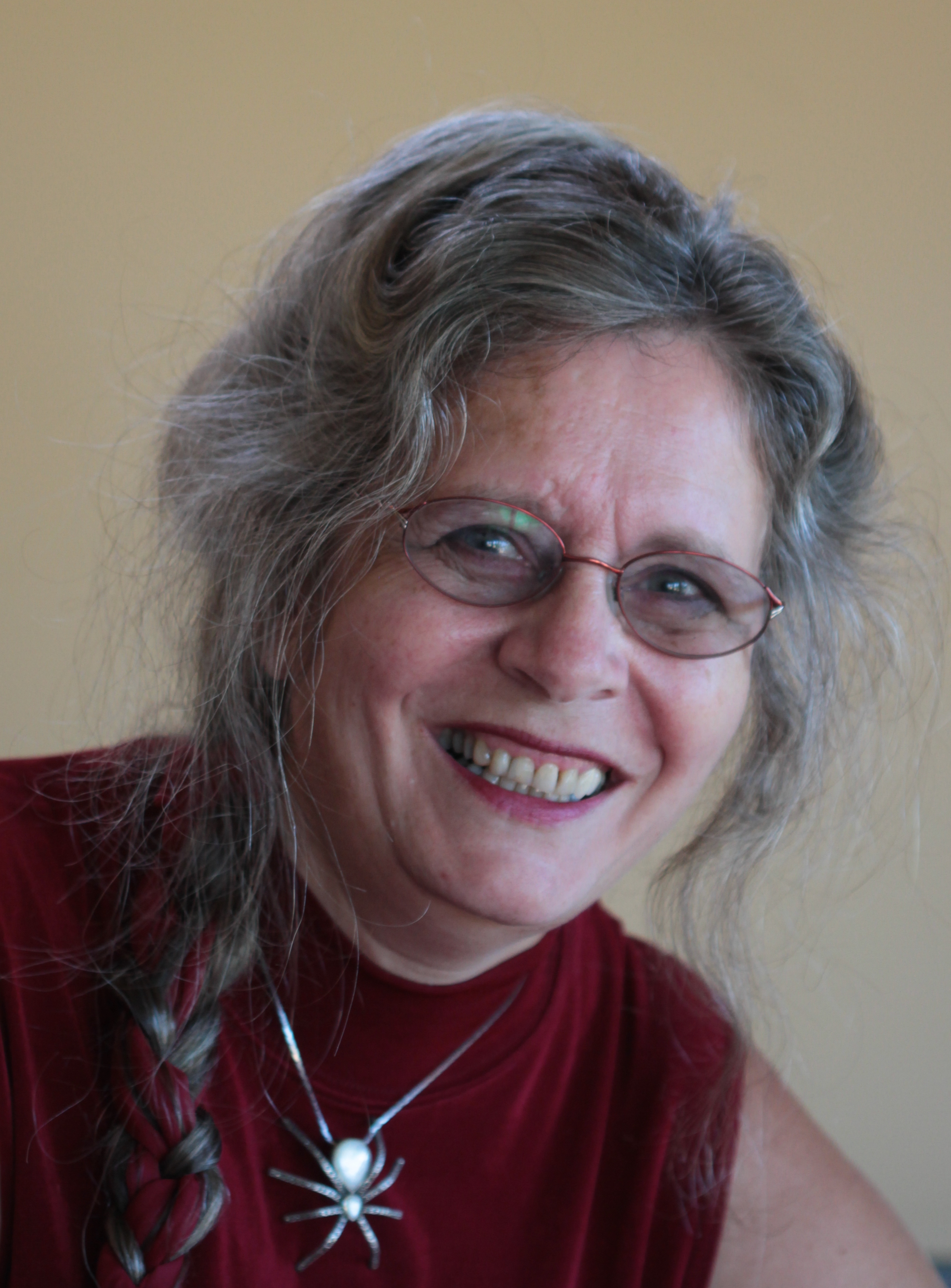
- Born: 1951 (age 74–75)
- Education: Monash University; La Trobe University; University of Melbourne
- Occupations: Science writer; Researcher; Educator
- Employer: La Trobe University
- Known for: Primary orality; Popular Science; Skepticism
- Website: lynnekelly.com.au

Lynne Kelly AM (born 1951) is an Australian writer, researcher and science educator. Her academic work focuses mainly on the study of primary orality, as well as the mnemonic devices used by ancient and modern oral cultures from around the world. She proposes a theory on the purpose of the Stonehenge megalithic, which she believes served as a centre for the transmission of knowledge among Neolithic Britons.

She has been interviewed on different podcasts and radio programs about her work on primary orality, popular science and skepticism.

== Work and education ==
Kelly holds a Bachelor of Engineering from Monash University, a Graduate Diploma of Computing from Deakin University, a Diploma of Education from Rusden State College, a Master of Education from Melbourne University and a Doctoral Degree from La Trobe University.

Kelly's writing also includes educational resources for courses on mathematics, thinking skills and information technology, as well as a novel. Kelly has also published books for popular science audiences on spiders, crocodiles and skepticism.

She has previously worked as a teacher and she currently works as an Honorary Research Fellow at La Trobe University in Melbourne, Australia.

== Research on primary orality and memory ==
A fundamental part of Kelly's research delves into the transmission of scientific and technological knowledge among small-scale oral cultures such as Aboriginal Australians, the Pueblo people and some African cultures.

Kelly's research indicates that oral cultures possess a large body of scientific knowledge on animal behavior, plant properties, the landscape, natural phenomena, location of sacred places and water sources. This knowledge is encoded in myths, rituals, chants and mnemonic devices.

According to Kelly's theory, the manner of accessing stored information would depend on whether the culture was mobile or more settled. Hunter-gatherer societies would depend on portable mnemonic devices and techniques that would allow them to use the landscape as a mnemonic tool, such as the method of loci. Kelly has observed similar techniques within the modern Australian Aborigines, who use features on the landscape as visual cues to retrieve information. On the other hand, societies that were less mobile but not completely settled would create local replications of the landscape to access information, such as circles of timber or stone, sequences of mounds and other prehistoric built environments.

Kelly's research also indicates that both nomadic and sedentary societies rely on performance and entertainment as a part of their complex knowledge storage system. The use of songs and rituals is a vital component of retention techniques which further strengthens memorization, and it is ubiquitous among the cultures studied by Kelly. People participating in the performance would sing and tell stories while also touching a mnemonic object, moving around the site, or dancing, as a way to trigger kinaesthetic cues to access the knowledge.

Lynne Kelly has spoken against the portrayal of native peoples by the media, and sometimes even in academia, as having a close relationship with their environment but being at the same time simplistic and superstitious. These portrayals tend to focus only on their religion and rituals, and very rarely acknowledge their vast scientific knowledge.

In 2015, Kelly published a book under the title Knowledge and Power in Prehistoric Societies, which incorporates the research from her doctoral thesis When Knowledge Was Power. This work explores the link between power and the control of knowledge in oral cultures, as well as the different mnemonic techniques and devices used by those cultures. Kelly also suggests a new theory on the purpose of the archaeological sites of Chaco Canyon, Poverty Point and Stonehenge.

=== The Memory Code ===
In June 2016, Kelly's doctoral research was published for a general readership under the title The Memory Code. This work comprises the results of Kelly's research, spanning over almost a decade, into mnemonics of Indigenous peoples from around the globe.

Kelly's work on Australian Aboriginals includes the identification of songlines with memory techniques. She has found research stating that up to 70% of these songlines contains knowledge about animals, plants and seasons.

The book created much interest from the media and the public even before its release. Since the publication of The Memory Code, Kelly has been invited to numerous radio shows and public lectures to discuss her work on indigenous knowledge, mnemonics and the application of memory techniques and devices in everyday life.

Kelly has been known for trying the same techniques she has researched to memorize long lists of categories and events, including succeeding to memorize all the countries of the world by population order; memorizing a historical chronology of prehistoric and historic events, and a guide of the 408 birds of the state of Victoria. She has memorized those lists and events using the loci method, the help of mnemonic devices, and by creating stories connecting the elements she is trying to memorize.

Kelly has received the support and orientation of Australian Aboriginal advisors for her research, particularly from her colleague Nungarrayi, who is Warlpiri. More recently, Kelly's 2021 collaboration with Aboriginal co-author, Margo Neale, enhanced her knowledge on the complexity of Australian Songlines, the basis of many of her ideas on Indigenous knowledge systems.

=== Theory on the purpose of Stonehenge ===
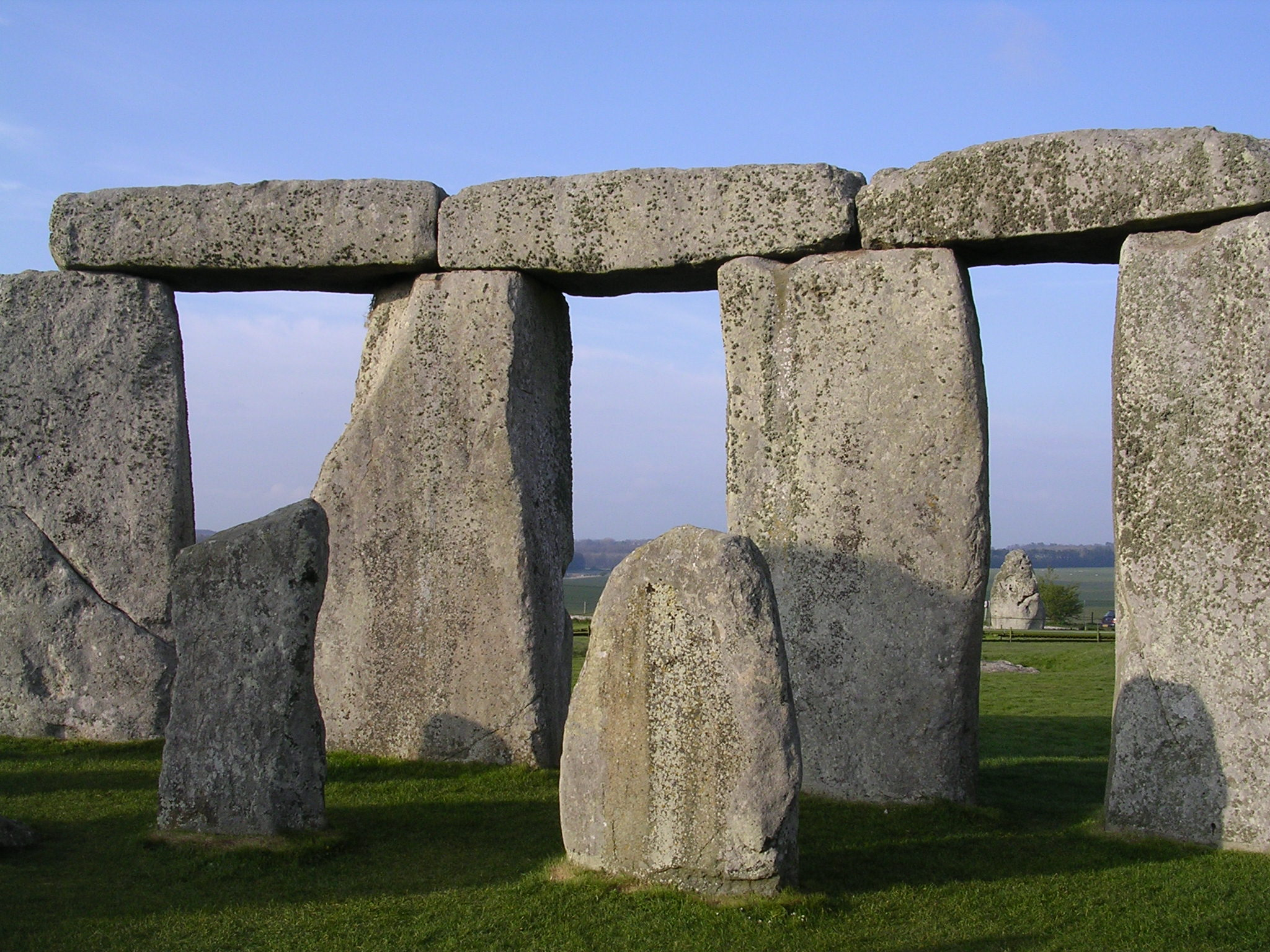
Inside Stonehenge, facing northeast, April 2005

According to Kelly's theory, Stonehenge served the purpose of a mnemonic centre for recording and retrieving knowledge by Neolithic Britons, who lacked written language. The knowledge could have included pragmatic information on animal classification and behavior, geography and navigation, land management and crop cycles, as well as cultural knowledge on history, politics, genealogy and religion.

In Knowledge and Power in Prehistoric Societies, Kelly suggests that knowledge may have been originally preserved by the nomadic Britons by using the landscape as a mnemonic tool, in a similar fashion to the memorization technique known as Method of loci. As the Britons started to settle, they would have needed to modify the way they stored their knowledge as they were not moving as much anymore, so they would have built Stonehenge in an attempt to replicate the landscape locally, allowing them to memorize and store knowledge. The circles and stones or timber posts would have represented the landscape, and each stone would have been associated with a segment of their knowledge system.

Kelly's research also indicates that once the Neolithic Britons' society settled, the ceremonial spaces would have become more restricted and the rituals controlled by the elites.

Kelly's theory on the purpose of Stonehenge would also explain certain physical features such as circles or lines of posts and ditches at other archaeological sites such as the Durrington Walls and Avebury, which previously had not been explained.

Kelly's theory is sustained by the record of archaeological changes and level of activity registered at Stonehenge. Those changes would be consistent with the social changes the Neolithic Britons would have experienced whilst transitioning from a hunter-gatherer society, where the knowledge was shared by the elders, to a sedentary society whose knowledge was restricted to the elites and transmitted via apprenticeship. This change in the control of knowledge would have eventually made Stonehenge unused and its primary purpose forgotten.

Her theory is also consistent with her previous research on mnemonic techniques used by ancient and modern cultures and the use of temples, myths and legends to pass on and remember knowledge. As the chance of survival for oral cultures is strongly dependent on their ability to store and retrieve information, the great efforts and the participation of the entire community on the construction of a site as large as Stonehenge are explained and justifiable.

== Works on popular science ==
Kelly is also known for her contribution to popular science literature. In 2006, she published a book on crocodiles under the title Crocodile: evolution's greatest survivor. In this work, Kelly collects both folklore and human-crocodile interactions from across the world, as well as the biology, behavior and evolution of crocodilians.

In 2009, Kelly published her book Spiders: Learning to Love Them, where she explores the biology and human perceptions around spiders, as well as offers a guide for spider identification. It is also a recount of the author's personal journey from disliking spiders to being fascinated by them. The book won "Best book in the category of Natural History" in the 2009 Whitley Awards by the Royal Zoological Society of New South Wales.

== Work in skepticism ==
Kelly has also been an active promoter of skepticism and educating the public on the importance of critical thinking and science. She has claimed to use magicians' tricks to advance skepticism. She was a founding member of the Australian Skeptics, and has spoken at their national convention in 2003, 2012 and 2015. In 2004, she was awarded the Skeptic of the Year title by the organization.

Kelly's interest in skepticism derives in part from her concern about how fake mediums and psychics exploit gullible or vulnerable people. She has criticized television shows which present mediums and psychics as a fact, which in her opinion could undermine the understanding of science among teenagers. Kelly also considers that a belief in the supernatural prevents people from appreciating science and the real wonders of the world, and causes unnecessary fear in young people.

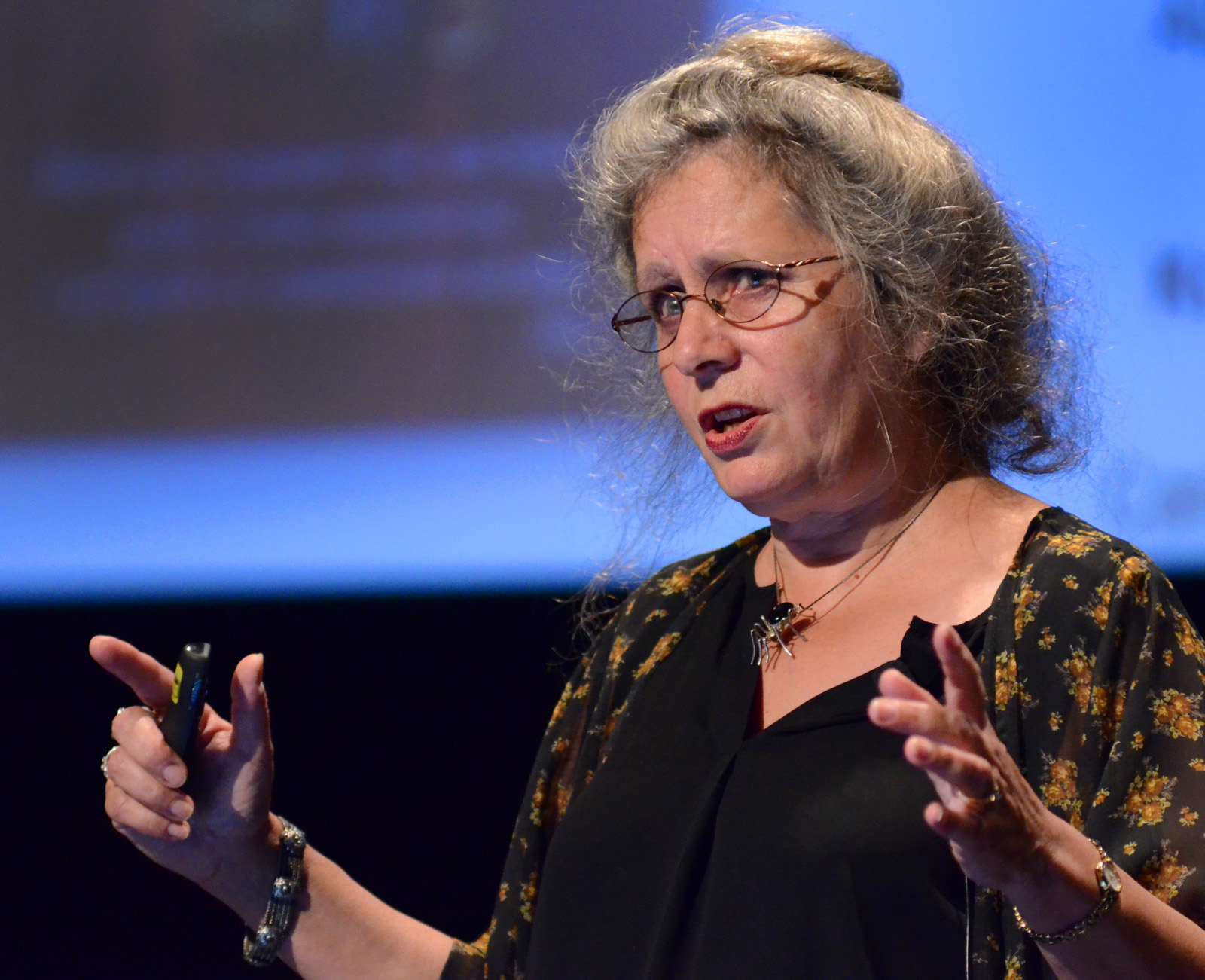
Lynne Kelly, Australian Skeptics National Convention 2015

=== Cold reading and tauromancy ===
Kelly has also investigated psychics and cold reading techniques. Kelly has investigated the methods used by psychics to convince their clients of their alleged supernatural powers, and she even experimented performing astrology readings. She later developed her own divination system, which she named Tauromancy, which she uses to debunk psychics by showing how it is possible to create an illusion of a psychic reading just through psychology and by using the client's reactions to the reader's suggestions. Her method includes objects suggestive of magic, such as a purported handwritten and illustrated book with the history of the tradition, a mat, essences, rods and metal masks.

Kelly has claimed that the effect of a successful reading is so powerful that even though she has revealed in advance to the customers that she is in fact not a real psychic, they refuse to believe that the information and personal details were obtained by mere cold reading techniques. On some occasions, Kelly has had to stop the reading as the client has become extremely emotional, with Kelly offering counselling instead, in which she has been trained. She has also said that intelligent people are easier to read as they have a larger pool of references to use to respond to her cues.

In 2003 she wrote a novel for young adults titled Avenging Janie which incorporated cold reading and a cult into the plot. The book was well received. Writer John Marsden said of it, "It's good to be reminded that there are still new plots out there – and writers for young people brave enough to take them on." Cold reading expert Ian Rowland said, "it really is an amazing piece of work."

=== The Skeptic's Guide to the Paranormal ===
Kelly has also written a book on the paranormal from a skeptic's point of view, aimed at a non-skeptical audience, titled The Skeptic's Guide to the Paranormal. In this work, Kelly explores a range of popular claims and stories about allegedly paranormal events such as crop circles, psychic detectives, and communicating with the dead, providing plausible scientific explanations for each of these phenomena.

== Awards and recognition ==
- In the 2022 Australia Day Honours, Kelly was appointed a Member of the Order of Australia for "significant service to science education as a writer and researcher".
- Songlines was shortlisted for the 2021 Victorian Premier's Prize for Nonfiction
- She was awarded an Arts Victoria literary grant for 2015, to develop Ancient Memory Spaces, "a literary non-fiction manuscript demonstrating the memory techniques used by non-literate societies to store and share knowledge of their culture".
- Kelly's book Spiders: learning to love them was awarded a Certificate of Commendation in the "Natural History" class of the 2009 Whitley Awards from the Royal Zoological Society of New South Wales.
- In 2004, she was named the Skeptic of the Year by the Australian Skeptics.

== Bibliography ==
- The Knowledge Gene: The incredible story of the supergene that gives us human creativity (2024), Allen & Unwin ISBN 978-1761470707
- Songlines: The Power and Promise (2020) co-authored with Margo Neale, Thames & Hudson ISBN 978-1760761189
- Memory Craft: Improve Your Memory Using the Most Powerful Methods From Around the World (2019) Allen & Unwin ISBN 978-1760633059
- The Memory Code: The Traditional Aboriginal Memory Technique That Unlocks the Secrets of Stonehenge, Easter Island and Ancient Monuments the World Over (2016) Allen & Unwin ISBN 978-1760291327 for Australia and New Zealand in July 2016, and February 2017 by Atlantic Books in the UK and Pegasus Books in the US.
- Knowledge and Power in Prehistoric Societies: Orality, Memory, and the Transmission of Culture (2015) Cambridge University Press ISBN 978-1107059375 OCLC 910935575
- When knowledge was power (2012, La Trobe University, PhD thesis)
- Spiderwoman (2013) Hampress ISBN 978-1922172204 OCLC 854852622
- Spiders: learning to love them (2009) Allen & Unwin ISBN 978-1741751796 OCLC 865288969
- Crocodile: evolution's greatest survivor (2006) Allen & Unwin ISBN 978-1741144987 OCLC 123416997
- The Skeptic's Guide to the Paranormal (2004) Allen & Unwin ISBN 978-1560257110 OCLC 62761268
- Avenging Janie. Lothian Books. 2003. ISBN 978-0734405524. OCLC 156031904.
- Words and Images (2002) (co-author) Wizard Books ISBN 1876367989
- Motion: Simple Concepts in Physics (2001 ) Wizard Books ISBN 1875739351
- Maths Wizard (2000) Wizard Books ISBN 1876367350
- Sound and Light (2000) Wizard Books ISBN 1875739696
- Mathematics by Computer: Iteration (1996), Wizard Books ISBN 1875739548
- Challenging Minds: Thinking Skills and Enrichment Activities(1996) Prufrock Press ISBN 978-1882664207
- Lasers (1996) The Wright Group
- Nuclear Technology (1991) (co-author), STAV Publishing ISBN 0949044180
- Practical Computing (1987) (with co-author Jacaranda-Wiley) ISBN 0701622423
