= Homeopathy Plus! =

Australian company

- Trade name: Homeopathy Plus!
- Type: Private
- Industry: Homeopathy
- Headquarters: Australia
- Key people: Fran Sheffield
- Website: www.homeopathyplus.com

Homeopathy Plus! is an Australian company run by homeopath Fran Sheffield in Tuggerah, New South Wales. It is known for the claim that homeopathy is an effective, and safer, alternative to vaccination for conditions including whooping cough, along with claims that homeopathy is superior to chemotherapy for cancer. The claims for "homeoprophylaxis" were assessed as misleading by the Complaints Resolution Panel of the Therapeutic Goods Administration and a retraction demanded; this was ignored. The prophylaxis claims were referred to the Australian Competition & Consumer Commission (ACCC), and although this was stated to have resulted in their removal, legal proceedings continued, culminating in a ruling by Justice Perry of the Federal Court of Australia in December 2014 that:

2) The First Respondent and the Second Respondent have in trade or commerce:

a) engaged in conduct that was misleading and deceptive or was likely to mislead and deceive, in contravention of section 18 of the ACL;
b) in connection with the supply or possible supply of Homeopathic Treatments, and in connection with the promotion of the supply of Homeopathic Treatments, made false or misleading representations that the Homeopathic Treatments are of a particular standard or quality in contravention of section 29(1)(a) and (b) of the ACL; and
c) in connection with the supply or possible supply of Homeopathic Treatments, and in connection with the promotion of the supply of Homeopathic Treatments, made false or misleading representations that Homeopathic Treatments have a use or benefit in contravention of section 29(1)(g) of the ACL.

The Federal judge concluded that: "there is no reasonable basis, in the sense of an adequate foundation, in medical science to enable the First Respondent and the Second Respondent to state that Homeopathic Treatments are safe and effective as an alternative to the Vaccine for the Prevention of Whooping Cough".

Sheffield was also the originator of a controversial change.org petition to the World Health Organization calling on the WHO to use homeopathy in the 2014 Ebola virus epidemic in West Africa; a New Zealand MP who signed the petition was demoted from his position as a result. The New Zealand Prime Minister John Key called the idea of homeopathy for Ebola "barking mad".

The sentence was announced on 14 October 2015: Fran Sheffield was fined $23,000 and banned from selling the products for five years, and Homeopathy Plus fined $115,000.
