= Energy Polarizer controversy =

1980s automobile controversy in Australia

1987 HDT Director model

During the 1980s, the Holden Dealer Team (HDT), a semi-official Australian racing outfit and car tuning partner of Holden, faced controversy after fitting cars with epoxy-resin boxes containing crystals and magnets they called "Energy Polarizers". These devices were pseudoscientifically claimed to improve performance by "aligning molecules".

In 1980 Peter Brock (Note: Not to confused with American automotive designer Pete Brock) formed Holden Dealer Team Special Vehicles, a car tuning company for Holden vehicles, and produced "homologation specials" based on the Holden Commodore. On 20 February 1987 HDT unveiled the HDT Director, based on the Holden Commodore (VL), with the option to install Energy Polarizer devices for AU$480. Brock described the boxes as "a magic cure" that "made a shit house car good". His belief in the devices originated from the influence of the Melbourne-based chiropractor Eric Dowker, who had helped Brock give up alcohol and cigarettes and influenced a belief in crystal healing and orgone energy. 173 units were sold with the Energy Polarizer. The HDT VL Director produced 177 kW (237 hp) from a 4,987cc modified Holden V8 engine.

Due to the controversy and the HDT team's installation of new rear suspension without prior permission or testing, Holden ended the relationship in 1987, later founding Holden Special Vehicles (HSV) with Tom Walkinshaw Racing (TWR) as its performance division. The Australian Skeptics awarded Peter Brock the 1986 'Bent Spoon Award' for the Energy Polarizer.

In 2011 Holden Dealer Team Special Vehicles released the "VL/VE Group A Plus Pack" with Energy Polarizer devices fitted, as part of the retro-styled "Heritage Series" of cars. In 2017 Holden produced a special edition Director model of the Holden Calais V (VF), 360 units were produced. In October 2026, at the Bathurst 1000 an Energy Polarizer was installed in Team 18's Camaro in partnership with the Holden Dealer Team business, after receiving permission from the Supercars Championship. The team revealed it through a social media post on 10 October.
