= Aboriginal Medical Services Alliance Northern Territory =

Health advocacy organisation

The Aboriginal Medical Services Alliance Northern Territory (AMSANT) is a healthcare policy organisation that serves Aboriginal communities in the Northern Territory of Australia. It is an independent, not-for-profit group that is funded by Australia's federal government, the Northern Territory Government, charities and non-governmental organisations.

The organisation has offices in Alice Springs and Darwin, but provides medical care throughout the entire Northern Territory. It is a member of the Northern Territory Aboriginal Health Forum, an umbrella organisation responsible for Aboriginal health policy in the Northern Territory, and of the National Aboriginal Community Controlled Health Organisation (NACCHO).

== History ==
AMSANT was established in October 1994 at a meeting of healthcare services in Central Australia. The following year, the organisation lobbied the Australian Government to transfer funding for Aboriginal healthcare from the Aboriginal and Torres Strait Islander Commission (ATSIC) to the Office for Aboriginal and Torres Strait Islander Health (OATSIH), a division of the Department of Health and Ageing (DoHA). AMSANT also lobbied the government to increase funding to Aboriginal Comprehensive Primary Health Care in the context of the Northern Territory Emergency Response (the "Intervention").

== Overview ==
AMSANT supports Aboriginal health services by advocating for the right of local Aboriginal communities to control their own primary health care services and to have those services funded adequately. As a peak body, AMSANT assists its member services through lobbying for improvements in the health status of Aboriginal people, promoting Aboriginal self-determination and community control and representing its member services in meetings and negotiations.

AMSANT's vision statement describes what AMSANT is working to achieve:

Aboriginal community controlled health services in the Northern Territory will be independent and successful organisations, integrated into the NT health system, to provide high quality and effective primary health care services that are responsive to the needs of the community.

AMSANT works with Aboriginal communities who wish to establish a community-controlled Aboriginal health service, as well as with communities who do not control the existing local health service but wish to have greater input into determining the policies and priorities of their primary health services. Its focus is supporting its members and assisting them to provide high quality comprehensive primary health care services for Aboriginal communities. The group is a member of the Northern Territory Aboriginal Health Forum, an umbrella organisation responsible for Aboriginal health policy in the Northern Territory, and of the National Aboriginal Community Controlled Health Organisation (NACCHO).

== Structure and members ==
All of the AMSANT member services attend general meetings which are held at least once every four months. The general meeting is the main decision-making organ of AMSANT, and there is a strong emphasis on consensus decision-making, so it is unusual for issues to come down to a vote. AMSANT has a board which is elected from the membership at the annual general meeting. The board has authority to make decisions for AMSANT between the general meetings.

AMSANT's chairperson is Marion Scrymgour, with John Paterson as CEO.

== Member health services ==
The community-controlled Aboriginal health services that are members of AMSANT are:

- Amoonguna Health Clinic
- Ampilatwatja Health Centre Aboriginal
- Anyinginyi Health Aboriginal Corporation
- Balunu Foundation (Balunu)
- Central Australian Aboriginal Alcohol Program Unit (CAAAPU)
- Central Australian Aboriginal Congress (CAAC)
- Council for Aboriginal Alcohol Program Services (CAAPS)
- Danila Dilba Health Service
- Ilpurla Aboriginal Corporation
- Kakadu Health Service
- Katherine West Health Board
- Laynhapuy Homelands Association
- Ltyentye Apurte
- Malabam Health Board
- Marthakal Homeland
- Miwatj Health
- Mutitjulu Health Service
- Ngalkanbuy Health Service
- Pintubi Homelands Health Service
- Sunrise Health Service
- Urapuntja Health Service, Utopia, Northern Territory
- Utju Health Service
- Western Aranda Health Aboriginal Corp (WAHAC)
- Western Desert Nganampa Walytja Palyantjaku Tjutaku Aboriginal Corp (WDNWPT)
- Wurli Wurlinjang Aboriginal Health Service

== Activities ==
AMSANT has a range of programs and projects which all aim to improve the provision of comprehensive primary health care to Aboriginal communities by services controlled by the local community. As of 2010 they included:

- eHealth
- Research and policy – AMSANT becomes involved in projects as a research partner; conducts research of its own; assists member services involved in research projects; develops policies and makes submissions to government on a range of issues relevant to Aboriginal health services.
- Health summits
- Public health – AMSANT employs public health medical officers as well as running a public health network and a public health advisory group.
- Leadership – AMSANT runs a number of leadership programs for the people who work in community controlled Aboriginal health services.
- General practice training and education
- Media and advocacy
- Workforce support – assisting services and advocating for improved training so that services can find and employ staff they need including doctors, nurses and Aboriginal health workers
- Other support for member services – including developing information and communication technology, an online administration manual for Aboriginal medical services, accreditation support, electronic health projects and a continuous quality improvement program
- Year of the Aboriginal Health Worker, 2011–2012

== Community control ==
AMSANT membership is only for Aboriginal community-controlled health services. AMSANT believes that community control is essential to providing the best comprehensive primary health care to Aboriginal communities. All of the health services which are AMSANT members:

- are incorporated as an independent legal entity;
- have a constitution which guarantees that the control of the body will be by Aboriginal people and that the principle of self-determination will be applied; and
- have compulsory accountability process which include general meetings open to all members of the local community and that the organisation's management committee are elected by the local Aboriginal community.

== NACCHO ==
Pat Turner AM was CEO of the National Aboriginal Community Controlled Health Organisation in 2017.
