= Indigenous health in Australia =

- Other names: Wellbeing of Australian Indigenous
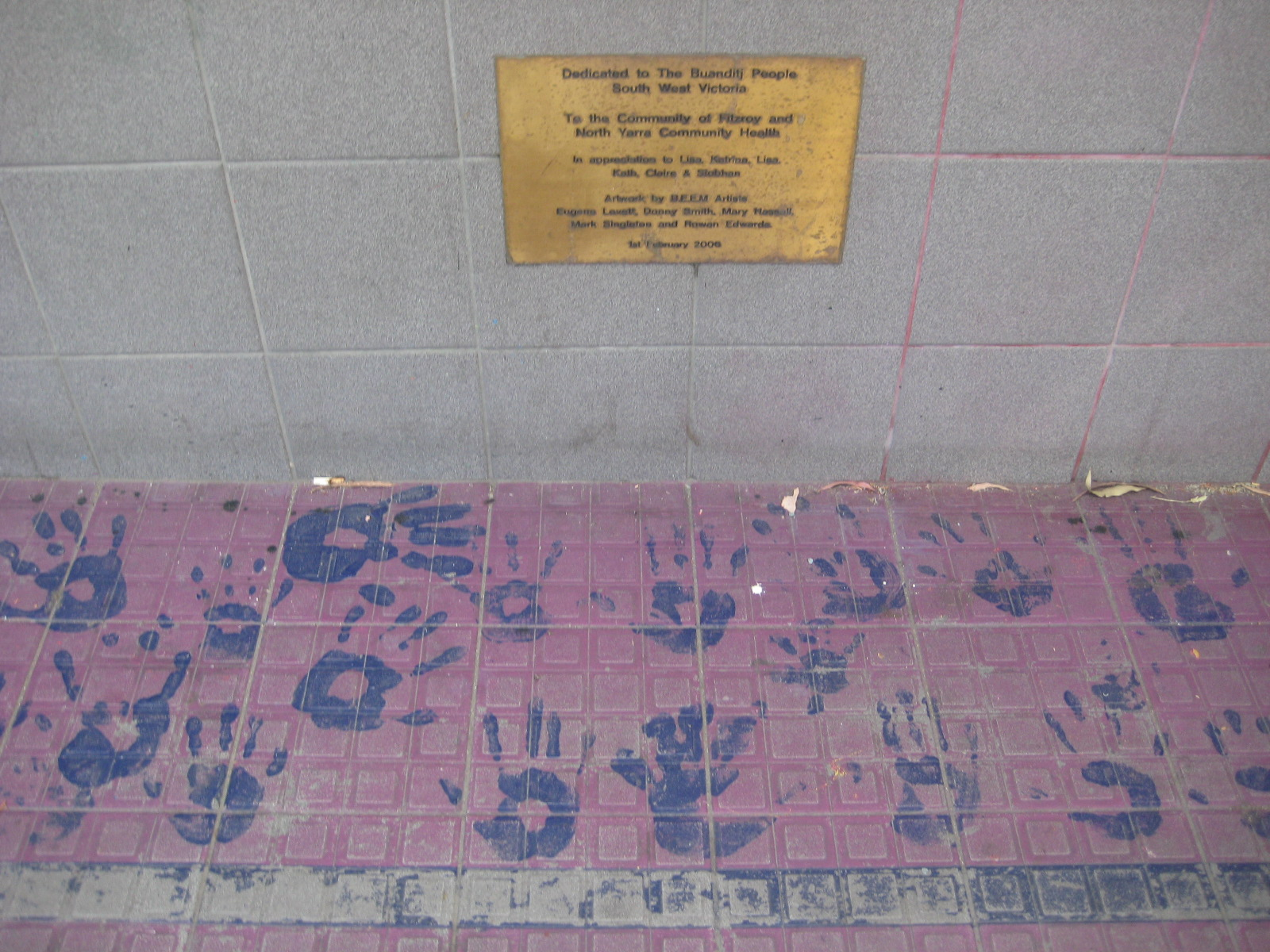
- Aboriginal mural and handprints at the North Yarra Community Health opening
- Complications: Circulatory system, kidney failure, communicable, diabetes, cot death, mental health, ophthalmology, neoplasms, respiratory, cancer
- Duration: Historical, ongoing
- Causes: Poor access to health services, higher unemployment, poverty, cultural pressures, cultural differences, remote community, inadequate housing and access to infrastructure, economic, societal, and racial disparities, high rates of incarceration
- Risk factors: Premature death, high rates of disease, shorter life expectancy, poor dental, oral and eye health
- Diagnostic method: Low levels, low rate of screening
- Prevention: Limited programs to close the gap
- Treatment: Delayed or inadequate treatment, common treatments, traditional, lack of treatment, low levels
- Prognosis: Death caused by diabetes, cancer, human T-lymphotropic virus 1, mental health, smoking, substance abuse, pneumococcal disease, and other complications
- Frequency: Most complications up to 10-fold higher. Communicable disease up to 70-fold higher. Relatively high rates of suicide, cancer, various complications especially among indigenous women, high hospitalization rate
- Deaths: Overall early death, relatively higher infant mortality, and 9 to 11 shorter life expectancy

Indigenous health in Australia examines health and wellbeing indicators of Indigenous Australians compared with the rest of the population. Statistics indicate that Aboriginal Australians and Torres Strait Islanders are much less healthy than other Australians. Various government strategies have been put into place to try to remediate the problem; there has been some improvement in several areas, but statistics between Indigenous Australians and the rest of the Australian population still show unacceptable levels of difference.

== Colonisation and ongoing disadvantage ==
Prior to European colonisation, it is likely that the health of Indigenous Australians was better than that of the inhabitants of poorer sections of Europe. Colonisation impacted the health of Indigenous Australians via land dispossession, social marginalisation, political oppression, incarceration, acculturation and population decline. The process of colonisation began with the arrival of the First Fleet in 1788. In the following decades, foreign diseases, dispossession, exploitation, warfare and violence proved devastating for the Indigenous population, and the immediate effect was a widespread increase in mortality and disease. By the end of the 19th century, Indigenous Australians were greatly reduced in numbers and the survivors were largely confined to remote reserves and missions. They were associated in the public mind with disease, which led to exclusion from institutions and isolation from non-Indigenous society for fear of contamination. These colonial policies resulted in segregated oppression and a lack of access to adequate medical care, leading to further disease and mortality.

The Australian government proceeded to deny the Indigenous people of their civil rights, including property rights; the ability to work and receive wages; and access to medical care and educational institutions. Legislation also allowed for the separation of Indigenous families, with guardianship being awarded to government officials called Protectors of Aborigines. Indigenous children forcibly removed from their families under Protection legislation in the first half of the 20th century are referred to as the Stolen Generations. Many of these children were neglected, abused, and denied of an education. The Australian government forced the Indigenous populations to assimilate into the colonisers' culture through schools and programs, where Indigenous languages were banned and any resistance to these practices could result in imprisonment or death. This process of acculturation has led to trauma, including historical, inter-generational, and social trauma. Issues such as anxiety, stress, grief, and sadness are produced from this trauma, which have led to higher suicide rates, violence, substance abuse and incarceration of Indigenous peoples today.

Social, political and economic factors that result from colonisation present barriers to quality healthcare, health education, and health behaviours. Acculturation has produced xenophobia, which has socially marginalized Indigenous people and excluded them from society. Social inclusion is a social determinant of health, and social marginalisation allows for injustices against Indigenous people to persist. Political disempowerment prevented them from accessing social services, sickness benefits, and from voting until the 1960s. Socio-economic inequality has resulted in poor employment opportunities, housing, education and healthcare. One in seven Indigenous Australians reported difficulty in accessing healthcare for their children, which include transportation costs and prescription costs. Displacement and disenfranchisement prevents access to healthcare resources such as screening programs, and results in delayed or inadequate treatment. An example of this can be seen in the high rates of cervical cancer, where a meta-analysis of Indigenous women from Australia, New Zealand, Canada and the United States attributed these rates to "socio-economic disenfranchisement resulting from colonialism", rather than genetics.

The displacement of Indigenous Australians to reserves and the isolation from society led to generations suffering from starvation and malnutrition. This has had profound effects on physical and intellectual development; Indigenous communities today in remote locations continue to suffer from malnutrition and chronic health problems, as well as lower levels of education. The persistence of inequality in educational attainment among contemporary Indigenous communities is viewed as a product of historical, political and social factors. European colonisers believed that Indigenous people were intellectually inferior, and education was thus denied as it was considered pointless. Low levels of education increase the likelihood of engaging in high risk health behaviours, as well as lower rates of participation in health screening and treatment. However, poor health behaviours and low utilisation of healthcare resources can be due to a combination of many factors. Racial discrimination towards Indigenous peoples that stems from processes of colonialism leads to a cumulative exposure to racism, and this is related to negative health outcomes. It produces feelings of anger and shame, which limits active participation in the mainstream healthcare system and society at large.

The outstation movement of the 1970s and 1980s, when Aboriginal people moved to tiny remote settlements on traditional land, brought health benefits, but funding them proved expensive, training and employment opportunities were not provided in many cases, and support from governments dwindled in the 2000s, particularly in the era of the Howard government.

Health issues cannot be separated from social and cultural factors such as racism, discrimination, cultural disconnection and lack of employment and educational opportunities. Colonisation has had an ongoing impact. Overcrowding and poor housing contributes to poor health and family dysfunction and violence. High rates of incarceration of adults and youth contribute to early death and poor mental health.

== Hospitalisation rate ==
Indigenous Australians go to hospital at a higher rate than non-Indigenous Australians. In 2010–11, Indigenous Australians used hospitals 2.5 times more frequently than non-Indigenous people. This rate comes from an age-standardised separation rate (hospital check-out) of 911 per 1,000 for Indigenous people.

The 2010–11 age-standardised separation rate for Indigenous people living in the NT was 1,704 per 1,000, 7.9 times the rate for non-Indigenous people. About 80% of the difference between these rates was due to higher separations for Indigenous people admitted for dialysis. The 2020 AIHW reported that Indigenous children are more likely to get hospitalized and experience tooth decay. Lack of access to the right diet, dental services, and other social disadvantages are reported as contributing factors to such poor health.

== Life expectancy ==
From 1996 to 2001, the Australian Bureau of Statistics (ABS) used indirect methods for its calculations, because census results were deemed to be unreliable, and figures published in 2005 (59.4 years for males and 64.8 years for females) indicated a widely quoted gap of 17 years between indigenous and non-indigenous life expectancy, though the ABS does not now consider the 2005 figures to be reliable.

The Social Justice Report: 2005 by the Australian Human Rights Commission reported a seventeen-year gap between the life expectancy of Indigenous Australians and non-Indigenous Australians. This prompted health and human rights activists to establish the "Close the Gap" campaign, which focused on health equality for Indigenous Australians, including increasing life expectancy, and associated factors such as housing.

In 2009, after previous methods of comparing life expectancy rates proved unreliable, a new method was developed by the ABS, based on tracing the deaths of people identified as Indigenous at the 2006 census. In 2009 the ABS estimated life expectancy at 67.2 years for Indigenous men (11.5 years fewer than for non-Indigenous) and 72.9 years for Indigenous women (9.7 years fewer than for non-Indigenous). Estimated life expectancy of Indigenous men ranged from 61.5 years for those living in the Northern Territory to a high of 69.9 years for those living in New South Wales, and for Indigenous women, 69.2 years for those living in the Northern Territory to a high of 75.0 years for those living in New South Wales.

As of 2010, life expectancy for Aboriginal and Torres Strait Islander men was estimated to be 11.5 years less than that of non-Indigenous men – 67.2 years and 78.7 years respectively. For Aboriginal and Torres Strait Islander women, the 2010 figures show a difference of 9.7 years – 72.9 years for Aboriginal and Torres Strait Islander women and 82.6 years for non-Indigenous women. Indigenous Australians are more likely to die at a younger age than their non-Indigenous counterparts due to being unhealthy.

A 2013 study, referring to the national Indigenous reform policy launched in 2008, Closing the Gap (see below), looked at the difficulties in interpreting the extent of the gap because of differing methods of estimating life expectancy between 2007 and 2012. It concluded:

A specific estimate of the life expectancy gap has not been established among stakeholders in Indigenous health. Agreement on the magnitude of the gap is arguably needed in order to evaluate strategies aimed at improving health outcomes for Indigenous Australians. Moreover, measuring progress towards 'closing the gap' depends on the availability of comparable estimates, using the same techniques of measurement to assess changes over time.

The 2019 report by the Close the Gap campaign reported that the gap in life expectancy was "widening rather than closing". The 2022 AIHW report showed that the cancer death rate rose from 205 to 235 per 100,000.

== Government initiatives ==
In 1989, the National Aboriginal Health Strategy was created.

Another attempt by the federal government to address health issues was via the creation of the Office of Aboriginal and Torres Strait Islander Health (OATSIH) in 1994, but this is no longer in existence.

In 2007/08, the Australian government focused mainly on decreasing "overcrowding" within remote indigenous communities in endeavours to improve health in rural populations. The Implementation of Australian Rural Accommodation (ARIA) Programme was granted A$293.6 million over four years to induce a significant level of housing reform.

In 2008, Aspen Medical established the Remote Area Health Corps (RAHC) as a non-profit subsidiary which was funded by the Australian Government through the Indigenous Australians' Health Programme: Stronger Futures Northern Territory initiative. Its primary objective is to alleviate persistent and chronic shortages in healthcare personnel within remote Aboriginal communities situated in the Northern Territory (NT).

RAHC operates by facilitating short-term placements, ranging from three to 12 weeks, while concurrently augmenting the pool of professionals equipped with the requisite skills and competencies to administer culturally sensitive care within these communities. The initiative particularly targets urban-based professionals who have previously lacked experience in remote healthcare settings. In 2021-2022, RAHC received A$6.4 million in funding, spending A$5.4 million due to less placements than anticipated during the pandemic.

In 2010–2011, health expenditure for Aboriginal and Torres Strait Islander people was estimated at A$4.6 billion, or 3.7% of Australia's total recurrent health expenditure. The Aboriginal and Torres Strait Islander population comprised 2.5% of the Australian population at this time.

Expenditure equated to A$7,995 per Indigenous person, which was 1.47 times greater than the A$5,437 spent per non-Indigenous Australian in the same year.

In 2010–2011, Governments funded 91.4% of health expenditure for Indigenous people, compared with 68.1% for non-Indigenous people.

In July 2018, Health Minister Greg Hunt and Ken Wyatt, then Minister for Indigenous Health, announced A$23.2 million in funding for 28 new health initiatives through the National Health and Medical Research Council (NHMRC), including expanding renal health units in remote parts so that patients could stay on country with their families. The NHMRC also launched a plan to help direct Indigenous health and research investment for the next ten years.

=== Closing the Gap ===
The Council of Australian Governments initiated the first multi-sector approach in regards to initiating strategies to overcome the large discrepancy between Indigenous and European health statistics. The strategy, named Closing the Gap, was launched in 2008. The plan's success was dependent on the level of collaboration between all levels of the Australian Government, Indigenous leaders/communities and the health sector.

Although there was some improvement in some areas, only two out of its seven targets were met. In July 2019, at the end of the first 10-year phase of Closing the Gap, the National Indigenous Australians Agency was established in July 2019, under the Minister for Indigenous Australians, Ken Wyatt, and this agency is now responsible for "lead[ing] and coordinat[ing] the development and implementation of Australia's Closing the Gap targets in partnership with Indigenous Australians".

== Health status ==
=== Overall ===
In 2009, 26% of Indigenous Australians living in remote areas experienced 40% of the health gap of Indigenous Australians overall.

The most common cause of hospital admissions for Indigenous Australians is for kidney dialysis treatment, as of 2014. End-stage kidney (or renal) disease (ESKD or ESRD) and hospitalisation for the is much higher among Indigenous than non-Indigenous Australians, in particular those living in remote areas, who are 70 times more likely to be hospitalised.

A 2007 study by the University of Queensland found that the 11 largest preventable contributions to the Indigenous burden of disease in Queensland were from the joint contribution of 11 risk factors, with the top three being high body mass (12.1%), tobacco (11.6%), and inadequate physical activity (7.9%). high cholesterol, alcohol, high blood pressure, low intake of fruit and vegetables, intimate partner violence, illicit drugs, child sexual abuse and unsafe sex completed the list. A 2014 follow-up report concluded that the "leading causes of disease and injury burden in the Aboriginal and Torres Strait Islander population were largely the same as in the non-Indigenous population: mental disorders, cardiovascular disease, diabetes, chronic respiratory disease and cancers" in the 2007 study. However, the rate and age distribution between the two populations are very different. Mental disorders and cardiovascular disease account for almost a third of the burden, with diabetes, chronic respiratory disease and cancers the next three leading causes. Also, Indigenous people carried a disproportionate share of the total disease burden for the state, increasing as remoteness increased. The study also highlighted the lack of data on epidemiology of many of the conditions suffered by the Indigenous population.

=== Summary table (2003) ===
Health problems with the highest disparity (compared with the non-Indigenous population) in incidence as of 2003 are outlined in the table below:

Health complication	Comparative incidence rate	Comment
Circulatory system	2 to 10-fold	5 to 10-fold increase in rheumatic heart disease and hypertensive disease, 2-fold increase in other heart disease, 3-fold increase in death from circulatory system disorders. Circulatory system diseases account for 24% deaths
Kidney failure	2 to 3-fold	2 to 3-fold increase in listing on the dialysis and transplant registry, up to 30-fold increase in end stage kidney disease, 8-fold increase in death rates from kidney failure, 2.5% of total deaths
Communicable	10 to 70-fold	10-fold increase in tuberculosis, hepatitis B and hepatitis C virus, 20-fold increase in chlamydia, 40-fold increase in shigellosis and syphilis, 70-fold increase in gonococcal infections
Diabetes	3 to 4-fold	11% incidence of type 2 diabetes in Indigenous Australians, 3% in non-Indigenous population. 18% of total indigenous deaths
Cot death	2 to 3-fold	Over the period 1999–2003, in Queensland, Western Australia, South Australia and the Northern Territory, the national cot death rate for infants was three times the rate
Mental health	2 to 5-fold	5-fold increase in drug-induced mental disorders, 2-fold increase in disorders such as schizophrenia, 2 to 3-fold increase in suicide.
Optometry/Ophthalmology	2-fold	A 2-fold increase in cataracts
Neoplasms	60% increase in death rate	60% increased death rate from neoplasms. In 1999–2003, neoplasms accounted for 17% of all deaths
Respiratory	3 to 4-fold	3 to 4-fold increased death rate from respiratory disease accounting for 8% of total deaths

Each of these indicators is expected to underestimate the true prevalence of disease in the population due to reduced levels of diagnosis.

In addition, the following factors have been at least partially implicated in the inequality in life expectancy:

- poverty
- insufficient education
- substance abuse
- for remote communities, poor access to health services
- for urbanised Indigenous Australians, cultural pressures which prevent access to health services
- cultural differences resulting in poor communication between Indigenous Australians and health workers

=== Diabetes ===
Anthropological research has revealed that Indigenous Australians often interpret diabetes using cultural and social frameworks that differ from biomedical models. These perspectives challenge public health narratives that portray the disease as primarily an individual lifestyle issue.

Anthropologist Françoise Dussart's ethnographic study of the Warlpiri in Central Australia found that community members did not misinterpret medical advice, but rather adapted it to reflect kinship responsibilities, independence, and mobility. One participant stated that staying near a clinic "is anathema to contemporary Warlpiri people…whose identity is still very much rooted in nomadism." Diabetes management occurs alongside practices such as attending ceremonies, food sharing, and family bonding, all of which may conflict with biomedical directives. Dussart refers to this as part of the "indigenization of modernity," in which external systems are reshaped to meet local requirements.

Soft drinks are also a risk factor for diabetes, as many Aboriginal communities, including Ngukurr, consume a lot of sugary drinks. Drinking soft drinks can be attributed to a number of interconnected factors. For example, in Ngukurr, high levels of chlorination and sediment in tap water make it unpleasant to drink, and they believe it is poisoned, resulting in a historical positioning of drinking water in the community and perceiving soft drinks as a health-seeking behaviour.

A complementary study in a Northern Territory Aboriginal community found that participants explained diabetes primarily through worry, food, family, and infection. While dietary changes were encouraged, prevention and treatment were rarely linked to clinical advice, and medical interventions were occasionally viewed sceptically. Illness was frequently understood in relation to emotional well-being and social obligations.

These studies suggest that Indigenous diabetes interventions are adaptive and culturally grounded. They propose that health programs may be more effective if they acknowledge Indigenous frameworks of meaning and promote social life, rather than focusing solely on individual behaviour.

=== Cancers ===
The incidence rate of cancer in Indigenous Australians compared with non-Indigenous Australians has varied between 2009 and 2017 and by state, but mostly showing a higher rate at between 1.1% and 1.4% for all cancers. Lung and breast cancers were the most common in the Indigenous population, and both lung and liver cancers were more common in the Indigenous than non-Indigenous population. Overall mortality rate from cancer was higher in New South Wales, Victoria, Queensland, WA, and the NT 2007–2014 (50% vs 65%, or 1.3 times as likely to die); this may be because they are less likely to receive the necessary treatments in time, or because the cancers that they tend to develop are often more lethal than other cancers. The 2022 AIHW report showed that the cancer death rate rose from 205 to 235 per 100,000.

Indigenous Australians have lower participation rates in cancer prevention and treatment programmes, particularly for breast, cervical, and gastrointestinal cancers, compared to non-Indigenous Australians. While public discourse sometimes attributes this to a lack of understanding or individual healthcare choices, anthropological research shows that the issue is shaped by historical, social, and cultural factors. Prejudice in healthcare settings has fostered a long-standing mistrust, and screening services are often delivered in ways that are culturally inappropriate or economically inaccessible.

Communication styles also influence participation. For example, many Aboriginal communities use "yarning," an informal, story-based approach to sharing health information, which contrasts with the professional, directive communication typical in mainstream health services. The absence of such culturally appropriate methods can discourage participation, with people living in remote areas often facing high travel costs to access specialised screening facilities. Research indicates that culturally appropriate, community led approaches such as mobile diagnostic units staffed by Indigenous healthcare professionals can improve both access and participation. In Australia, integrating Indigenous cultural traditions into cancer care is considered essential for reducing inequities and promoting better health outcomes.

=== Human T-lymphotropic virus 1 ===
In central Australia, Indigenous Australians have human T-lymphotropic virus 1 at a rate thousands of times higher than non-Indigenous Australians.

=== Smoking ===
In 2008, 45% of Aboriginal and Torres Strait Islander adults were current daily smokers. Smoking is one of the main factors contributing to chronic disease. Amongst Indigenous Australians 1 in 5 mortalities are caused by smoking. If the number of smoking Indigenous Australians is reduced to equal the number of non-smoking non-Indigenous individuals there is a potential decrease of 420 mortalities among Aboriginal and Torres Strait Islanders. In 2010 the Australian Government have put in place a 10-year program aimed at improving the health of Indigenous and Torres Strait Island. Specific types of cancer including lung and cervical cancer occurs to 52% of indigenous women due to their smoking habit.

=== Mental health ===
In 2010, the rate of high or very high levels of psychological distress for Aboriginal and Torres Strait Islander adults was more than twice that of non-Indigenous Australians. A 2007 study in The Lancet found that the four greatest preventable contributions to the Indigenous mental health burden of disease were: alcohol consumption, illicit drugs, child sexual abuse and intimate partner violence. Up to 15% of the 10 year life expectancy gap compared to non-Indigenous Australians has been attributed to mental health disorders.

Research indicates that Indigenous Australian concepts of health and illness differ from the Western biomedical perspective, which diagnoses illness through individual physical symptoms. A biosocial approach has been proposed, one that recognises how cultural identity, community connections and historical experiences shape health outcomes. Within this framework, mental health is understood as a part of social and emotional wellbeing, linking kinship, spirituality, relationship with the land and cultural obligations. Healing may therefore involve community involvement or restoring historical gaps, and only later drawing on biomedical treatment such as counselling or medication.

Mental health, suicide and self-harm remain major concerns, with the suicide rate being double that of the non-Indigenous population in 2015, and young people experiencing rising mental health rates. A 2017 article in The Lancet described the suicide rate among Indigenous Australians as a "catastrophic crisis":

In 2015, more than 150 Indigenous people died by suicide, the highest figure ever recorded nationally and double the rate of non-Indigenous people, according to the Australian Bureau of Statistics. Additionally, Indigenous children make up one in three child suicides despite making up a minuscule percentage of the population. Moreover, in parts of the country such as Kimberley, WA, suicide rates among Indigenous people are among the highest in the world.

The report advocates Indigenous-led national response to the crisis, asserting that suicide prevention programmes have failed this segment of the population. These statistics are influenced by multiple factors in addition to biomedicine. They can be understood through an alternative body politic in which Indigenous health is interconnected with histories of colonisation, racism and social inequality.These conditions constitute structural violence, disrupting cultural continuity and community cohesion, contributing to high rates of mental illness. Intergenerational trauma from the Stolen Generations has further worsened these conditions, resulting in high incidences of anxiety, depression, PTSD and suicide which has resulted in unstable parenting and family situations.

A mistrust of Western psychiatry persists among Indigenous people, partly due to past segregation policies that removed people from their families and communities, imposing treatment without cultural understandings. This has shaped public discourse and reinforced biomedical framings of mental health that often overlook Indigenous perspectives. Research identifies cultural consonance as a contributing factor to mental well-being, referring to the degree to which individuals' lives align with cultural values and community obligations.

The 2019 ABS data showed that about 24% of Indigenous people, including children with 23% of males and 25% of females distribution, experienced mental health issues. The survey indicated that anxiety is the most common condition with females suffering at 21% and males at a lower, 12%. Studies suggest that culturally grounded, community-led responses to mental health can complement biomedical care, recognising both the statistics and lived experiences of Indigenous Australians.

=== Substance abuse ===
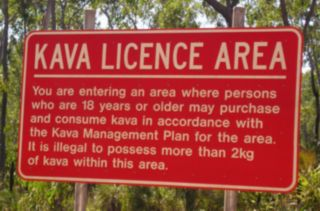
A signpost outside Yirrkala, NT, where kava was introduced as a safer alternative to alcohol, but was withdrawn in 2007.

Many Indigenous communities suffer from a range of health, social and legal problems associated with substance abuse of both legal and illegal drugs, including but not limited to alcohol abuse, petrol sniffing, the use illegal drugs such as methamphetamines and cannabis and smoking tobacco.

Tobacco use has been estimated to be the "greatest contributor (23%) to the gap in the disease burden between Indigenous and non-Indigenous Australians", with Indigenous people more than 2.5% likely to smoke daily than non-Indigenous Australians. The 2004–05 National Aboriginal and Torres Strait Islander Health Survey (NATSIHS) by the ABS found that, after adjusting for age differences between the two populations, Indigenous adults were more than twice as likely as non-Indigenous adults to be current daily smokers of tobacco.

NATSIHS 2004/05 found that the proportion of the Indigenous adult population engaged in "risky" and "high-risk" alcohol consumption (15%) was comparable with that of the non-Indigenous population (14%), based on age-standardised data. The definition of "risky" and "high-risk" consumption used is four or more standard drinks per day average for males, two or more for females. The 2007 National Drug Strategy Household Survey reported that Indigenous peoples were "more likely than other Australians to abstain from alcohol consumption (23.4% versus 16.8%) and also more likely to consume alcohol at risky or high-risk levels for harm in the short term (27.4% versus 20.1%)". These NDSHS comparisons are non-age-standardised; the paper notes that Indigenous figures are based on a sample of 372 people and care should be exercised when using Indigenous figures.

A 2016 study reported that in the Northern Territory (which has the greatest proportion of Indigenous Australians than any other state or territory, at 32%), per capita alcohol consumption for adults was 1.5 times the national average. In addition to the health risks associated with alcohol use, there is a relationship among alcohol abuse, violence and trauma. There has been increasing media attention to this problem, but it defies simple analysis or solutions as the issues are complex and intertwined. The study attempted to collate existing data on the problems and attempts to address them, concluding that more funding is needed to investigate the feasibility and suitability of the various interventional approaches in the Northern Territory.

Indigenous Australians were 1.6 times as likely abstain completely from alcohol than non-Indigenous people in 2012–13. Twice as many men as women drink alcohol, and more likely to drink to risky levels. Foetal alcohol syndrome has been a problem, but the rate of pregnant women drinking had dropped from 20% in 2008 to 10% in 2015. To combat the problem, a number of programs to prevent or mitigate alcohol abuse have been attempted in different regions, many initiated from within the communities themselves. These strategies include such actions as the declaration of "dry zones" within Indigenous communities, prohibition and restriction on point-of-sale access, and community policing and licensing. In the 1980s, the psychoactive drug kava was introduced into the NT by Pacific Islander missionaries as an alternative to alcohol, as a safer alternative to alcohol. In 2007, commercial import of kava was banned, but Fiji and Vanuatu have asked the government to lift the ban.

Petrol sniffing has been a problem among some remote Indigenous communities. Petrol vapour produces euphoria and dulling effect in those who inhale it, and due to its widespread availability, became a popular drug. Proposed solutions to the problem became a topic of heated debate among politicians and the community at large. In 2005 this problem among remote Indigenous communities was considered so serious that a new, low aromatic petrol Opal was distributed across the Northern Territory to combat it. A 2018 longitudinal study by the University of Queensland, commissioned by the National Indigenous Australians Agency, reported that the number of people sniffing petrol in the 25 communities studied had declined by 95.2%, from 453 to just 22. However volatile substance misuse (VSM) was found to continue to occur in several communities, mostly occasionally and opportunistically.

The 2018 UQ study also reported that alcohol and cannabis were the drugs causing most concern in many of the 25 communities studied. "Alcohol was reported as being in regular use in 22 communities, and occasionally present in two others. Cannabis was reported as being in regular use in all 25 communities, and a serious problem in 20 communities. Ice was reported to be present in 8 of the 25 communities" (although mostly only occasional use).

Hill et al. (2022) report that treatment in alcohol and other drug ('AoD') programs host disproportionally high numbers of young Aboriginal people compared to other groups. Additionally, the same study highlighted an essential element of healing for these indigenous youth involves the implementation of an Aboriginal knowledge and belief paradigm that upholds young Aboriginal peoples' understanding of health, healing and wellbeing.

AoD programs focus on prevention, education, treatment, and support for individuals dealing with addiction or other negative impacts of substance issues. Marijuana and amphetamines were the most common types of drugs used. Methods such as interviews and participant observation led Hill et al. (2022) to recommend that social inequalities, economic disparities, government policy, and Australia's traumatic colonial history are significant risk factors influencing the increased health inequalities and illness faced by Aboriginal youth. Additionally, family violence and cultural violence largely contribute to AoD abuse amongst young Aboriginal people. Problems in the implementation of rehabilitation programs are strongly linked to the disproportionately high numbers of Aboriginal youth as patients and few Aboriginal staff.

The researchers (Hill et al.:2022) suggest that working within an Indigenous knowledge paradigm supported by the community, involvement of family, and the recognition of 'self' can be implemented as key reforms to rehabilitate the health outcomes of Aboriginal Australians.

Furthermore, Anderson and Kowal (2012) present a similar critique of the lack of cultural understanding of Indigenous knowledge paradigms relating to health. For example, colonisation and assimilative cultural and linguistic practices such as psychosocial health determinants and 'self-efficacy' (both concepts understood in the dominant Western health paradigm) are suggested to be viewed in the Indigenous cultural context as a sense of connection to land and a collective, rather than an individualistic sense of efficacy. Thus, it is important to implement culturally appropriate systems when addressing Indigenous healthcare.

=== Violence and accidents ===
Aboriginal and Torres Strait Islander Australians, particularly men, experience significantly higher rates of death from accidents and acts of violence compared to non-Indigenous Australians. Domestic and family violence is a major contributing factor to these outcomes, affecting safety, well-being, and community cohesion in urban, regional, and remote areas. These disparities have been linked to the lasting impacts of colonisation, dispossession, and systemic injustice, which have shaped the conditions under which many Aboriginal and Torres Strait Islander families live. Additionally, crowded living conditions result in poor mental and physical health, with Indigenous households having an average size of 3.5 persons compared to Australias 2.5. Overcrowding adds social stress and acts as an aggravating factor in physical and mental health, contributing to higher rates of domestic violence. Scholars note that systemic oppression has produced intergenerational trauma, reinforced by structural inequalities such as systemic racism, over-policing, and the disproportionate removal of Aboriginal and Torres Strait Islander children from their families.

A 2025 Human Rights Watch report documented that some Aboriginal mothers, particularly those experiencing domestic violence, avoid seeking medical or police assistance due to fears that child protection authorities may remove their children. In Western Australia, Indigenous children comprise over 60% of those in out-of-home care, a proportion that has increased more than fourfold over the past two decades. Research also highlights mistrust toward law enforcement as a barrier to safety in some communities. Historical patterns of criminalisation and disproportionate policing have contributed to low levels of confidence in police among many First Nations people. Studies suggest that this mistrust is linked to certain youth behaviours, such as joyriding, which for some, serves as a form of protest against perceived systemic injustices.

=== Infant mortality ===
The Aboriginal and Torres Strait Islander infant mortality rate varies across Australia. In New South Wales, the rate was 7.7 deaths per 1,000 live births in 2006–2008, compared with the non-Indigenous infant mortality rate of 4.3 deaths per 1,000 live births. In the Northern Territory, the Aboriginal and Torres Strait Islander infant mortality rate was over three times as high as the non-Indigenous infant mortality rate (13.6 deaths per 1,000 live births compared with 3.8 deaths per 1,000 live births).

Male Aboriginal and Torres Strait Islander infant mortality in the Northern Territory was about 15 deaths per 1,000 live births, while female Aboriginal and Torres Strait Islander infant mortality was 12 deaths per 1,000. For non-Indigenous males the rate was 4.4 deaths per 1,000 births and for females it was 3.3 deaths per 1,000 (ABS 2009b).

Between 1998 and 2008 the Indigenous to non-Indigenous rate ratio (the Aboriginal and Torres Strait Islander rate divided by the rate for other Australians) for infant mortality declined in the Northern Territory an average of 1.7% per year, while the rate difference (the Aboriginal and Torres Strait Islander rate minus the rate for other Australians) almost halved from 18.1 to 9.8 deaths per 1,000 births, which suggests that the gap between Aboriginal and Torres Strait Islander and non-Indigenous infant mortality in the Northern Territory has reduced (ABS 2009b).

=== Pneumococcal disease ===
Indigenous Australians have a higher rate of Invasive pneumococcal disease (IPD) than the wider Australian population. In Western Australia between 1997 and 2007, the IPD incidence rate was 47 cases per 100,000 population per year among Aboriginal people and 7 cases per 100,000 population per year in non-Aboriginal people.

After the introduction of a pneumococcal conjugate vaccine (7vPCV), total IPD rates among Aboriginal children decreased by 46% for those less than 2 years of age and by 40% for those 2–4 years of age. Rates decreased by 64% and 51% in equivalent age groups for non-Aboriginal children.

=== Oral health ===
Until the 1980s Aboriginal children were recognised as having better oral health than non-Aboriginal children. Today, average rates of tooth decay in Aboriginal children are twice as high as non-Aboriginal children. Between 1991 and 2001, the rate of tooth decay amongst Aboriginal children living in metropolitan areas fell, going against the increase in child tooth decay in remote areas. A study performed in 2001-2002 showed that Indigenous Australian patients showed a higher ratio of missing or decayed teeth than European patients, but a lower ratio of filled teeth.

A 2003 study found that complete loss of all natural teeth was higher for Aboriginal people of all age groups (16.2%) compared to non-Aboriginal people (10.2%). In remote communities, those with diabetes were found to have over three times the number of missing teeth than those without diabetes. Type 2 diabetes has been related to poor oral health.

Changes in the Australian Indigenous diet away from a traditional diet, which had originally contained high levels of protein and vitamins. High in fibre and sugar and low in saturated fats – to a diet high in sugar, saturated fats and refined carbohydrates has negatively affected the oral health of Indigenous Australians.

A 1999 study found that the water in rural and remote areas of Australia is less likely to be fluoridated than metropolitan areas, reducing access for many Aboriginal communities to fluoridated water. Fluoridated water has been shown to prevent dental decay.

=== Hearing loss ===
Aboriginals experience a high level of conductive hearing loss largely due to the massive incidence of middle ear disease among the young in Aboriginal communities. Aboriginal children experience middle ear disease for two and a half years on average during childhood compared with three months for non indigenous children. If untreated it can leave a permanent legacy of hearing loss. The higher incidence of deafness in turn contributes to poor social, educational and emotional outcomes for the children concerned. Such children as they grow into adults are also more likely to experience employment difficulties and find themselves caught up in the criminal justice system. Research in 2012 revealed that nine out of ten Aboriginal prison inmates in the Northern Territory suffered from significant hearing loss.

Andrew Butcher speculated in 2018 that the lack of fricatives and the unusual segmental inventories of Australian languages may be due to the very high presence of otitis media ear infections and resulting hearing loss in their populations. People with hearing loss often have trouble distinguishing different vowels and hearing fricatives and voicing contrasts. Australian Aboriginal languages thus seem to show similarities to the speech of people with hearing loss, and avoid those sounds and distinctions which are difficult for people with early childhood hearing loss to perceive. At the same time, Australian languages make full use of those distinctions, namely place of articulation distinctions, which people with otitis media-caused hearing loss can perceive more easily. This hypothesis has been challenged on historical, comparative, statistical, and medical grounds.

== Health dynamics ==
A number of factors help to explain why Aboriginal and Torres Strait Islander people have poorer health than other Australians. In general, Aboriginal and Torres Strait Islander people are more likely to have lower levels of education, lower health education, higher unemployment, inadequate housing and access to infrastructure than other Australians.

In particular, crowded housing has been identified as contributing to the spread of infectious diseases. Aboriginal and Torres Strait Islander Australians are also more likely to smoke, have poor diets and have high levels of obesity.

A 2007 study found that the 11 largest preventable contributions to the indigenous burden of disease in Australia were tobacco, alcohol, illicit drugs, high body mass, inadequate physical activity, low intake of fruit and vegetables, high blood pressure, high cholesterol, unsafe sex, child sexual abuse and intimate partner violence. The 11 risk factors considered together explain 37% of the total burden of disease experienced by Indigenous Australians. The remaining 63% consists of a range of known and unknown risk factors, yet to be identified or quantified.

=== Contemporary diet ===
Poor-quality diet among the Indigenous population is a significant risk factor for three of the major causes of premature death in Indigenous Australians – cardiovascular disease, cancer and type 2 diabetes. Much of this burden of disease is due to extremely poor nutrition throughout life.

A 2013 study of Indigenous dietary patterns in Northern Territory communities found there was a high expenditure on beverages and corresponding high intake of sugar-sweetened beverages coupled with low expenditure (and low intakes) of fruit and vegetables. Similarly high per capita consumption of sugar-sweetened beverages has also been reported among Aboriginal and Torres Strait Islander children at the national level.

Modern Aboriginal Australians living in rural areas tend to have nutritionally poor diets, where higher food costs drive people to consume cheaper, lower quality foods. The average diet is high in refined carbohydrates and salt, and low in fruit and vegetables. There are several challenges in improving diets for Aboriginal Australians, such as shorter shelf lives of fresh foods, resistance to changing existing consumption habits, and disagreements on how to implement changes. Some suggest the use of taxes on unhealthy foods and beverages to discourage their consumption, but this approach is questionable. Providing subsidies for healthy foods has proven effective in other countries, but has yet to be proven useful for Aboriginal Australians specifically.

=== Cross-cultural miscommunication ===
Among the factors that have been at least partially implicated in the inequality in life expectancy between Indigenous and non-Indigenous people in Australia are cultural differences resulting in poor communication between Indigenous Australians and health workers.

According to Michael Walsh and Ghil'ad Zuckermann, Western conversational interaction is typically "dyadic", between two particular people, where eye contact is important and the speaker controls the interaction; and "contained" in a relatively short, defined time frame. However, traditional Aboriginal conversational interaction is "communal", broadcast to many people, eye contact is not important, the listener controls the interaction; and "continuous", spread over a longer, indefinite time frame.

Acute rheumatic fever and rheumatic heart disease

The statistics of Acute Rheumatic Fever ('ARF') and Rheumatic Heart Disease ('RHD') highlight the lack of access to healthcare within Indigenous communities in Australia. According to the ENDRHD (End Rheumatic Heart Disease Centre of Research Excellence) (2023) ARF and RHD are third-world diseases that are prominent within Aboriginal and Torres Strait Islander communities.

Due to the lack of accessible healthcare in many areas of central Australia, indigenous Australians are prevented from taking the necessary medications to be cured. Thus, morbidity and mortality rates amongst Aboriginal and Torres Strait Islanders under 55 years of age with ARF and RHD are 60% more likely to develop the diseases than other demographics (ENDRHD:2023).

Additionally, Anderson and Kowal (2012:438) highlight the discrepancy between Aboriginal health and other cultures is higher in 'remote areas' where traditional Indigenous culture, knowledge and communication are prevalent.

The high statistics in comparison to non-indigenous people (Mitchell et al.:2019) showcase the lack of appropriate and culturally inclusive healthcare available to these communities. For example, ARF and RHD require a monthly injection of penicillin after the initial infection which is neglected due to different cultural and linguistic beliefs, values, and understanding of health and treatment.

Reasons for the lack of healthcare within these communities can be due to the power imbalance between Indigenous and non-Indigenous people because of colonisation, which has been a long-debated topic within the Australian government and society. However, it is still evident that many of these communities lack staff, funding, training, communication and technology for their health services. Structural violence and institutionalised racism are examples of contributing factors to the current situations relating to ARF and RHD (Haynes et al.: 2021).

=== Hospital partnerships with traditional healers ===
The ngangkari are traditional healers of the Anangu Aboriginal people of the Western Desert cultural bloc, who have been invited to partner with hospitals in South Australia to offer traditional healing services.

== Studies relating to Aboriginal people only ==
The following studies are confined to Aboriginal peoples only, although not necessarily only true of those populations:

- A 2015 study showed that Aboriginal Australians have disproportionately high rates of severe physical disability, as much as three times that of non-Aboriginal Australians, possibly due to higher rates of chronic diseases such as diabetes and kidney disease. The study found that obesity and smoking rates were higher among Aboriginal people, which are contributing factors or causes of serious health issues. The study also showed that Aboriginal Australians were more likely to self-report their health as "excellent/very good" in spite of extant severe physical limitations.
- One study reports that Aboriginal Australians are significantly affected by infectious diseases, particularly in rural areas. These diseases include strongyloidiasis, hookworm caused by Ancylostoma duodenale, scabies, and streptococcal infections. Because poverty is also prevalent in Aboriginal populations, the need for medical assistance is even greater in many Aboriginal Australian communities. The researchers suggested the use of mass drug administration (MDA) as a method of combating the diseases found commonly among Aboriginal peoples, while also highlighting the importance of "sanitation, access to clean water, good food, integrated vector control and management, childhood immunisations, and personal and family hygiene".
- A study examining the psychosocial functioning of high-risk-exposed and low-risk-exposed Aboriginal Australians aged 12–17 found that in high-risk youths, personal well-being was protected by a sense of solidarity and common low socioeconomic status. However, in low-risk youths, perceptions of racism caused poor psychosocial functioning. The researchers suggested that factors such as racism, discrimination and alienation contributed to physiological health risks in ethnic minority families. The study also mentioned the effect of poverty on Aboriginal populations: higher morbidity and mortality rates.
- Aboriginal Australians suffer from high rates of heart disease. Cardiovascular diseases are the leading cause of death worldwide and among Aboriginal Australians. Aboriginal people develop atrial fibrillation, a condition that sharply increases the risk of stroke, much earlier than non-Aboriginal Australians on average. The life expectancy for Aboriginal Australians is 10 years lower than non-Aboriginal Australians. Technologies such as the Wireless ambulatory ECG are being developed to screen at-risk individuals, particularly rural Australians, for atrial fibrillation.
- According to the Journal of Australian Indigenous Issues in 2020, three in four people who were tested for unconscious bias by the Australian National University held a negative view of Indigenous Australians.

== See also ==
- Animal Management in Rural and Remote Indigenous Communities (AMMRIC)
- Australian Indigenous HealthInfoNet – internet resource
- COVID-19 pandemic: impact on Indigenous Australians
- Health in Australia
- New World syndrome
- Race and health
- History of public health in Australia
