= Tennant Creek Brio =

Artist collective in Northern Territory, Australia

The Tennant Creek Brio is an artist collective living and working on Warumungu Country in Tennant Creek in the Northern Territory of Australia. The work across medium, using found and salvaged items such as barrels, meat hooks, car bonnets, poker machines, television screens, and geological maps from the region's abandoned Warrego mine.

It includes collaborations between artists such as Fabian Brown Japaljarri, Lindsay Nelson Jakamarra, Joseph Williams Jungarayi, Clifford Thompson Japaljarri, Jimmy Frank Jupurrula, Fabian Rankine Jampijinpa, Marcus Camphoo Kemarre and former Collingwood AFL player Rupert Betheras.

The group first formed in 2016 as part of an outreach program at the local men's centre, Anyinginyi Health Aboriginal Corporation. They have worked from the Nyinkka Nyunyu Art and Culture Centre in 2017.

They have presented work at the Biennale of Sydney, Coconut Studios, Charles Darwin University Gallery, Thom Gallery, as well as a survey show at the Australian Centre for Contemporary Art in 2024.
