= Australian Indigenous HealthInfoNet =

Australian information service and website

The Australian Indigenous HealthInfoNet, formerly National Aboriginal and Torres Strait Islander Health Clearinghouse, is an internet resource that collects, collates, interprets, and presents evidence-derived knowledge on Aboriginal and Torres Strait Islander health in Australia.

== History ==
The HealthInfoNet was established in September 1997 as the National Aboriginal and Torres Strait Islander Health Clearinghouse. It developed into a more comprehensive web-based resource for knowledge about Indigenous health and was renamed the Australian Indigenous HealthInfoNet in 2000 to reflect this broader purpose” Dr Wooldridge, the then Federal Health Minister, said at the launch of the renamed HealthInfoNet “In a truly innovative way, even by international standards, the Australian Indigenous HealthInfoNet uses the Internet to enable people from all around Australia and overseas to share readily ideas on what health interventions work, find out where resources are available and discuss how best practice health care can be provided.”

== Purpose ==
The purpose of the website is to make its evidence-based knowledge about Indigenous health issues readily accessible via the Internet to inform policy, practice, research, teaching and general community understanding. In this way it contributes to improving the health of Aboriginal and Torres Strait Islander people.

In September 2017 at the 20th anniversary event of the HealthInfoNet, then Minister for Indigenous Health, Ken Wyatt AM, praised the website, saying "...whilst there are obvious benefits for government agencies, health practitioners, researchers and policymakers in providing a mechanism for evidence-based decision making, Aboriginal and Torres Strait Islander communities are the real winners, as HealthInfoNet plays an important role in closing the gap in health".

== Governance and funding ==
HealthInfoNet is part of Edith Cowan University in Western Australia. Its work is guided by a national Advisory Board of 13 members who are prominent in the field of Aboriginal and Torres Strait Islander health and provide cultural governance. There is also a national network of honorary consultants who have expertise in various areas of Aboriginal and Torres Strait Islander health.

Since its inception, core funding for the HealthInfoNet is provided by the Australian Department of Health through Edith Cowan University.

== Target audience ==
The HealthInfoNet defines its target audience broadly as all people working, studying or interested in Aboriginal and Torres Strait Islander health. It aims to engage with key decision makers, influencers, users and front line health practitioners who work in the area of Aboriginal and Torres Strait Islander health to facilitate the exchange and sharing of high quality knowledge and information. The ultimate aim is to bring about improvements in Aboriginal and Torres Strait Islander health.

The HealthInfoNet engages actively with various stakeholder groups:

- Aboriginal and Torres Strait Islander community controlled health services and their representative bodies
- government departments of health and Indigenous affairs
- non-government organisations
- professional associations
- health service workforce (including Aboriginal and Torres Strait Islander Health Workers, doctors, nurses and other health workers)
- research organisations
- academic institutions including tertiary and technical
- training organisations.

== The resource ==
The resource provides comprehensive, up-to-date, evidence-derived information about Australian Indigenous health. The website has a number of component parts including:

- a comprehensive annual Overview of Aboriginal and Torres Strait Islander health
- a searchable list of publications on Aboriginal and Torres Strait Islander health
- a refereed e-journal
- collated information on a range of specific health topics, information on health systems and workforce information
- A separate Alcohol and Other Drugs Knowledge Centre web resource
- A website supporting the national Tackling Indigenous Smoking workforce
- A peer-reviewed Journal of the Australian Indigenous HealthInfoNet

The HealthInfoNet also supports a number of online yarning places (Twitter, LinkedIn, Instagram and Facebook) that enable people interested in Australian Aboriginal and Torres Strait Islander health to share information, knowledge and experience about specific health topics.
