= Michael Kidd (physician) =

Australian physician (born 1959)

Michael Kidd AO, MD, FAHMS, FRACGP

President World Organization of Family Doctors (WONCA)
- In office June 2013 – November 2016
- Preceded by: Richard Roberts
- Succeeded by: Amanda Howe

Personal details
- Born: 11 November 1959 (age 66) Melbourne, Victoria, Australia
- Spouse: Alastair McEwin AM (2018–present)
- Education: Melbourne University

Michael Richard Kidd is Australia's Chief Medical Officer; in this role he is the key medical adviser to the Australian Government and the Australian Department of Health, Disability and Ageing. He also holds academic appointments as the Foundation Director of the International Centre for Future Health Systems at the University of New South Wales in Sydney, Australia and as Professor of Global Primary Care and Future Health Systems at the University of Oxford in the United Kingdom, where he is also a Fellow of Green Templeton College and Kellogg College.

He is a past president of the Royal Australian College of General Practitioners (RACGP), a past president of the World Organization of Family Doctors (WONCA) and former Deputy Chief Medical Officer with the Australian Government Department of Health and Aged Care.

== Early life and education ==
Kidd was born 11 November 1959 in Melbourne, Victoria.

He was educated at Belle Vue Primary School, and later Trinity Grammar School, Melbourne. In 1983, he obtained MBBS (Hons) at the University of Melbourne, a postgraduate diploma in Community Child Health at Flinders University in 1989, a research Doctorate of Medicine in medical education at Monash University in 1995, and he was awarded Fellowship of the Royal Australian College of General Practitioners in 1989.

== Professional career ==
Kidd was President of the Royal Australian College of General Practitioners from 2002–06. He was Head of the Department of General Practice at The University of Sydney between 1998 and 2008. In 2009, he was appointed as an Honorary Professor with the School of Medicine at The University of Sydney.

From 2009–16, he served as the Executive Dean of the Faculty of Medicine, Nursing and Health Sciences at Flinders University with responsibility for the School of Medicine, the School of Nursing and Midwifery, and the School of Health Sciences.

In 2017, he was appointed as Professor of Global Primary Care with the Southgate Institute for Health, Equity and Society at Flinders University, and as Professor and Chair of the Department of Family and Community Medicine at the University of Toronto. In 2018, he was appointed as Director of the World Health Organization Collaborating Centre on Family Medicine and Primary Care. In 2020, he was appointed as Principal Medical Advisor and Deputy Chief Medical Officer with the Department of Health, Australia and served in this role until June 2023.

He is a Member of the Australian Institute of Company Directors and was a member of the board of directors of beyondblue from 2011–2020.

He served ten years as a member of the International Scientific Advisory Board of the UK Biobank Research Project based at Oxford University.

From 2008–10, he was the Chair of the advocacy organisation Doctors for the Environment Australia. He served as World President of WONCA from June 2013 to November 2016.

He is the founder and editor-in-chief of the Journal of Medical Case Reports, the world's first online, PubMed listed, international medical journal devoted solely to case reports from all medical disciplines.

He is the author/editor of several books including Save your life and the lives of those you love – your GP’s six step guide to good health, published by Allen and Unwin in 2007. According to WorldCat, the book is held in 131 libraries. His book on the health and well being of doctors and medical students entitled First Do No Harm – how to be a resilient doctor in the 21st century was published by McGraw Hill in 2009. According to WorldCat, the book is held in 123 libraries.

== Government appointments ==
Professor Kidd served as Deputy Chief Medical Officer and Principal Medical Adviser with the Department of Health and Aged Care during the COVID-19 pandemic. In March 2025, Kidd was appointed Australia's Chief Medical Officer from 1 June 2025.

Kidd was Chair of the Australian Government's Ministerial Advisory Committee on Blood Borne Viruses and Sexually Transmissible Infections, from 2009–16, and was also chair of the South Australian Health and Medical Research Advisory Council.

He was also a member of the Australian Therapeutic Goods Advisory Council, the Australian Government's Medical Training Review Panel, the Privacy Advisory Committee of Australia's Federal Privacy Commissioner, and a member of the Council of the Australian Government's National Health and Medical Research Council.

== Honours ==
Kidd is an elected Fellow of the Australian Academy of Health and Medical Sciences and the Australasian College of Health Informatics. He has been awarded honorary fellowships of: the Royal College of General Practitioners (UK), the Royal New Zealand College of General Practitioners, the Hong Kong College of Family Physicians, the Academy of Family Physicians of Malaysia, the College of General Practitioners of Sri Lanka, the Bangladesh Academy of Family Physicians, and the Australasian College of Nutritional and Environmental Medicine.

He has been awarded honorary membership of the World Psychiatric Association, the Romanian National Society of Family Medicine, the Slovak Society of General Practice Medicine, and the Armenian Psychiatric Association, and honorary life membership of the Health Informatics Society of Australia and the General Practitioners' Association of Nepal.

In 2007, he received the Australian Medical Association Award for Excellence in Health Care in recognition of his contribution to primary care, medical education and the health care of disadvantaged people in Australia.

In 2014, he was awarded the Rose Hunt Medal, the highest award of the Royal Australian College of General Practitioners for services to Australian general practice.

In the 2009 Queen's Birthday Honours List, he was made a Member of the Order of Australia (AM) for service to medicine and education in of general practice and primary health care, and via a range of professional organisations. He was promoted to Officer of the Order of Australia (AO) in the 2023 King's Birthday Honours.

== Selected works ==
- Hovenga E, Kidd MR, Cesnik B (1996). Health Informatics: an Overview, Churchill-Livingstone, London. ISBN 0443054304.
- Kidd MR, McCoy R (2003). Oxford Textbook of Primary Medical Care (chapter on HIV/AIDS in Primary Care), Oxford University Press, Oxford. ISBN 978-0198565802
- Rowe L, Kidd MR (2007). Save your life – and the lives of those you love, Allen and Unwin, Sydney. ISBN 9781741751888
- Rowe L, Kidd MR (2009). First do no harm – how to be a resilient doctor in the 21st century, McGraw-Hill, Sydney. ISBN 9780070276970
- Kidd MR (2013). The Contribution of Family Medicine to Improving Health Systems: a guidebook from the World Organization of Family Doctors (2nd Edition), CRC Press-Taylor and Francis, Abingdon. ISBN 9781846195549
- Kidd MR, Heath I, Howe A (2016). Family Medicine: The Classic Papers, CRC Press-Taylor and Francis, Abingdon. ISBN 9781846199943
- Salah H, Kidd MR (2018). Family Practice in the Eastern Mediterranean Region, CRC Press-Taylor and Francis, Abingdon. ISBN 9781138498587
- Rowe L, Kidd MR (2018). Every doctor, CRC Press-Taylor and Francis, Abingdon. ISBN 9781138497856
