= Australian Centre for Disease Control =

Government agency

Agency overview
- Formed: 1 January 2024
- Jurisdiction: Australian Government
- Headquarters: Canberra
- Minister responsible: Mark Butler, Minister for Health and Ageing
- Agency executive: Zoe Wainer, Director-general
- Parent department: Department of Health, Disability and Ageing
- Website: www.cdc.gov.au

The Australian Centre for Disease Control (CDC) is an Australian government agency responsible for disease control and management of public health emergencies. The agency is within the Department of Health, Disability and Ageing, and the National Notifiable Diseases Surveillance System (NNDSS) is within this agency.

== History ==
The Australian Centre for Disease Control (CDC) was formed on 1 January 2024, as an interim agency, during the Albanese government's inquiry into the COVID-19 pandemic in Australia. Legislation to create a permanent and independent CDC was introduced in to Parliament in September 2025. It was passed by both Houses on 6 November 2025 and was established on 1 January 2026.

The interim agency executive was Mary Wood. After the CDC transitioned from an interim to a permanent organisation, it has been headed by a director-general. Zoe Wainer was appointed inaugural director-general of the CDC on 23 December 2025, to formally commence in the role on 1 March 2026.

== Governance ==
The agency is under the control of the Department of Health, Disability and Ageing and overseen by the Minister for Health and Ageing, Mark Butler, who is responsible for appointing the leadership team. as of 2026 the director-general is Zoe Wainer. Wainer is a is also a medical doctor with a clinical background in cardiothoracic surgery and thoracic surgical oncology, who was previously Deputy Secretary for Community and Public Health in the Victorian Department of Health.

== National Notifiable Diseases Surveillance System ==
The National Notifiable Diseases Surveillance System (NNDSS) is a division of the CDC that compiles information on over 70 diseases that pose a threat to public health in Australia. The NNDSS produces the National Notifiable Disease List (NNDL), which lists the diseases that are required to be notified under Australian legislation. These diseases are monitored by the NNDSS.
