= Journal of Medical Case Reports =

- Discipline: Case report
- Language: English
- Edited by: Michael Kidd

Publication details
- History: 2007–present
- Publisher: BioMed Central
- Open access: Yes

Standard abbreviations
- ISO 4: J. Med. Case Rep.

Indexing
- ISSN: 1752-1947

Links
- Journal homepage

Journal of Medical Case Reports is an open access peer-reviewed medical journal publishing case reports and research on case reports. It was established in 2007 and is published by BioMed Central. The editor-in-chief is Michael Kidd (University of Sydney). The journal is abstracted and indexed in CINAHL and Scopus.
