= Supply Nation =

NGO that certifies Indigenous ownership of businesses in Australia

Supply Nation (formerly the Australian Indigenous Minority Supplier Council) is a non-profit organisation that aims to grow the Aboriginal and Torres Strait Islander business sector through the promotion of supplier diversity in Australia. The organisation was founded in 2009 by Michael McLeod and Dug Russell, co-founders of Message Stick Communications, with pilot funding from the federal government.

Supply Nation certifies Aboriginal and Torres Strait Islander businesses as being genuinely Indigenous by establishing that they are at least 51% owned, managed, and controlled by Indigenous Australians. Once an Indigenous business is certified it is able to use the Supply Nation certification logo on its marketing material, access the corporate and government Member database, and get discounted rates to Supply Nation events and workshops. Supply Nation has certified over 450 Indigenous businesses, covering nearly every industry sector. Supply Nation is part funded by the Federal Government, but gets the remainder of its funding by charging an annual membership fee to its corporate, government, and non-profit members.

On 1 July 2015, Supply Nation launched a new publicly available directory of 50% or more Indigenous-owned businesses, called Indigenous Business Direct. As of August 2018, Supply Nation had over 1,500 Indigenous businesses registered or Certified on Indigenous Business Direct.

== Members ==
Becoming a member gives that company, non-profit organisation, or government agency access to Supply Nation services designed to boost that organisation's supplier diversity efforts. Members pay an annual fee depending on its size and structure. Since Supply Nation was founded, members have transacted over A$200M with Certified Suppliers, translating to a significant boost to the Indigenous business sector. According to the Supply Nation website, there are currently 268 Members.

== Indigenous businesses ==
Indigenous businesses are Registered with Supply Nation first, which requires 50% minimum Indigenous ownership. Eligible businesses can then elect to be Certified, which requires 51% ownership, management and control by Indigenous people.

Category	Registered suppliers	Certified suppliers
Indigenous ownership requirement	50% owned	51% owned, managed & controlled (trading evidence of $50k income in last 12 mths)

Registered businesses are considered genuinely Indigenous for the purposes of the Indigenous Procurement Policy and are listed on Indigenous Business Direct. Certified Suppliers receive a number of other benefits from Supply Nation and are aligned to the International standards of minority ownership set by Supply Nation's sister councils in USA, Canada, South Africa, China and the UK.

The government organisation Indigenous Business Australia is also working towards the same cause by offering advice, workshops, support programmes, and funding to eligible Indigenous business owners.
