= Opal (fuel) =

Type of Australian gasoline

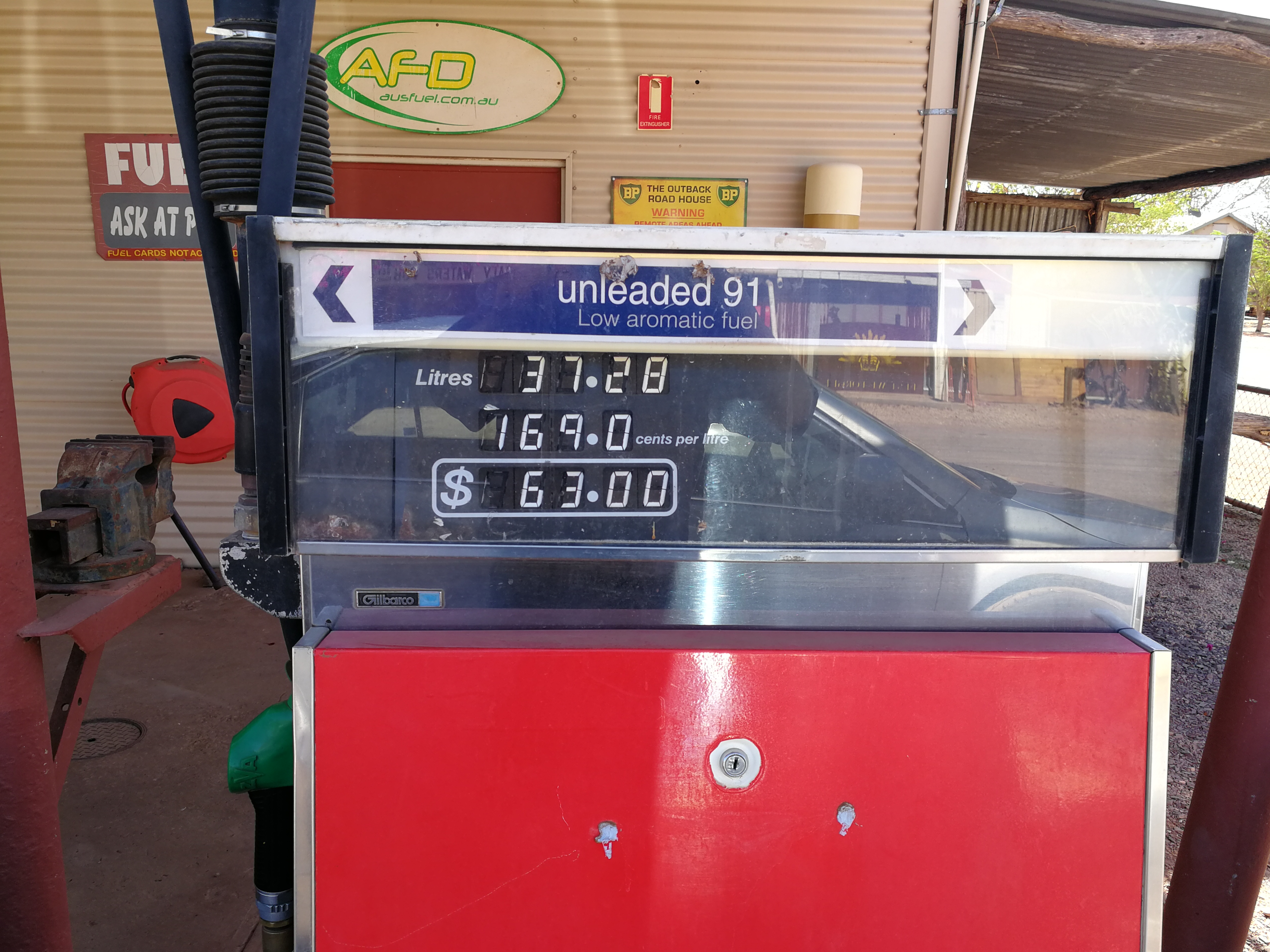
Petrol pump with low-aromatic petrol in Daly Waters, Northern Territory, Australia

Opal is a variety of low-aromatic 91 RON petrol developed in 2005 by BP Australia to combat the rising use of gasoline as an inhalant in remote Indigenous Australian communities.

Though more expensive to produce, requiring a $0.33/litre Federal subsidy, a 2006 report found it would likely save at least $27 million per year when the social and health costs of petrol-sniffing were taken into account.

A 2010 senate report showed that the introduction of Opal in 106 communities across remote and regional Australia had led to a 70% drop in petrol sniffing in those communities.

Typical unleaded petrol contains 25% aromatics, such as toluene, ortho-xylene and para-xylene. In contrast, Opal contains only 5% aromatics, which means that it has less of the toluene and other solvents which produce the intoxication (or "high") that inhalant users are seeking. The Australian Government subsidises Opal's provision and restricts traditional unleaded petrol in some remote communities. According to BP, the lower volatile component in Opal means that cars using it are less prone to vapour lock.

Prior to the introduction of Opal, Comgas (a brand of the aviation fuel avgas) was used in many communities to discourage use of fuel as an inhalant. Unlike Opal, however, Comgas contains tetraethyllead (TEL), a poisonous substance that inhibits catalytic converters and is therefore banned for automobile use in most parts of the world especially after the discovery that it increased concentrations of lead particles over the entire earth, including the poles.

== See also ==
- Indigenous health in Australia
- Indigenous Australians
