= Department of Health, Disability and Ageing =

Australian federal government department

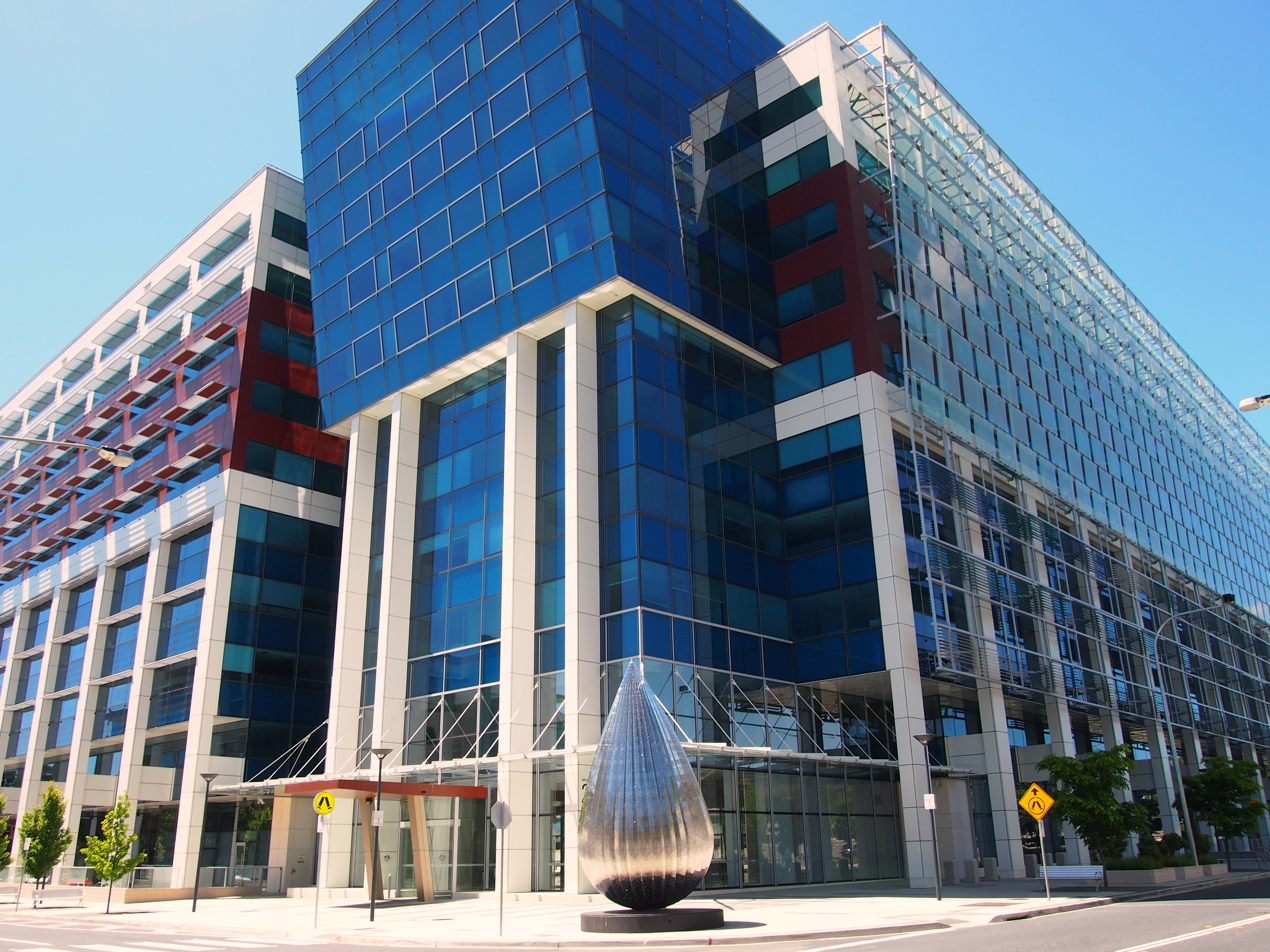
- The department head office in Woden, ACT

Department overview
- Formed: 13 May 2025 (under new name/portfolio)
- Preceding agencies: Department of Health and Aged Care (II) (2022–2025); Department of Health (II) (2013–2022); Department of Health and Ageing (2001–2013)
- Jurisdiction: Australian Government
- Headquarters: Canberra
- Employees: ▲7,135 (2024)
- Annual budget: ▲ A$127 billion (2025–26)
- Ministers responsible: Mark Butler, Minister for Health and Ageing, and for Disability and the NDIS; Jenny McAllister, Minister for the National Disability Insurance Scheme; Sam Rae, Minister for Aged Care and Seniors; Rebecca White, Assistant Minister for Health and Aged Care, and for Indigenous Health; Emma McBride, Assistant Minister for Mental Health and Suicide Prevention, and for Rural and Regional Health
- Department executives: Blair Comley, Secretary; Charles Wann, Chief Operating Officer; Michael Kidd, Chief Medical Officer; Alison McMillan, Chief Nursing and Midwifery Officer
- Website: health.gov.au

The Department of Health, Disability and Ageing is a department of the Australian Government that is responsible for funding and regulating health care, aged care, and certain disability programs. It is also involved in preventative health promotion and public health education initiatives. The department manages schemes such as Medicare and the Pharmaceutical Benefits Scheme (PBS), and statutory agencies such as the Therapeutic Goods Administration and National Blood Authority.

The department is responsible to parliament through the Minister for Health and Ageing, a cabinet minister, and is supported by two other ministers and two assistant ministers. The department secretary, Blair Comley, is responsible for the day-to-day accountability of the organisation. The Chief Medical Officer is Professor Tony Lawler and the Chief Nursing and Midwifery Officer is Allison McMillan, who both oversee clinical operations.

== History ==
The first Department of Health was established in 1921 and was the precursor to today's Department of Health. It was dissolved in 1987, when it was merged with the Department of Community Services to form the Department of Community Services and Health.

In June 1991, the Department of Health, Housing and Community Services was formed when housing industry programs were transferred from the Department of Industry, Technology and Commerce. In March 1993 the Department of Immigration, Local Government and Ethnic Affairs joined with the Department of Health, Housing and Community Services to form the Department of Health, Housing, Local Government and Community Services. Subsequently, in December 1993, the department was abolished and replaced with the Department of Human Services and Health. Also in 1994, the Office of Aboriginal and Torres Strait Islander Health was established.

After a new government was elected in March 1996, the Department of Health and Family Services was formed. The department also had responsibility for the Supported Accommodation Assistance Program from the former Department of Housing and Regional Development. Later, the department assumed responsibility for Aboriginal and Torres Strait Islander health matters from the Aboriginal and Torres Strait Islander Commission.

After the October 1998 election, the department was abolished and replaced by the Australian Federal Department of Health and Aged Care, named to reflect new responsibilities and functions. Responsibility for Family and Children's Services, Disability Programs and the Commonwealth Rehabilitation Service were transferred to the Department of Family and Community Services on 22 October 1998.

Following the November 2001 election, the Australian Federal Department of Health and Aged Care was abolished and replaced with the Australian Federal Department of Health and Ageing. The Australian Federal Department of Health and Ageing was abolished in 2013 and replaced by the Australian Federal Department of Health on 18 September 2013 by way of an Administrative Arrangements Order issued by the governor-general on the recommendation of the Abbott government.

On 1 July 2022, the Department of Health became the Department of Health and Aged Care following an Administrative Arrangements Order made by the governor-general. The departmental news release explained this as reflecting the "importance of aged care to the community, and the department's focus on aged care reform" following the Royal Commission into Aged Care Quality and Safety.

On 13 May 2025, the department was renamed Department of Health, Disability and Ageing following another Administrative Arrangements Order. The National Disability Insurance Scheme and Foundational Supports were also transferred from the Department of Social Services to the newly renamed department. Sport and recreation policy and functions were transferred to the Department of Infrastructure, Transport, Regional Development, Communications, Sport and the Arts.

== Overview ==
=== Leadership ===
Senior leadership of the department
Role	Person	Date appointed
Secretary	Blair Comley	17 July 2023
Deputy Secretary, Health Products Regulation	Tony Lawler	July 2023
Deputy Secretary, Health Strategy, First Nations and Sport	Celia Street	
Deputy Secretary, Health Resourcing	Penny Shakespear	
Deputy Secretary, Ageing and Aged Care	Sonja Stewart	December 2024
Deputy Secretary, Primary and Community Care	Liz Develin	January 2024
Deputy Secretary, Centre for Disease Control	Mary Wood	
Chief Operating Officer	Charles Wann	February 2020
Chief Health Economist	Emily Lancsar	April 2024
Chief Medical Officer	Michael Kidd	
Chief Nursing and Midwifery Officer	Alison McMillan	

=== Scope ===
According to the Administrative Arrangements Order issued 13 May 2025, matters dealt with by the department include:

- Public health, including health promotion, health protection, and disease prevention
- Health and medical research
- Primary health care and mental health care systems
- Hospital funding and policy, including oversight of the National Health Reform Agreement and the National Health and Hospitals Network framework
- Private health insurance
- Pharmaceutical and Medicare benefit schemes
- Hearing services funding and policy, and the Australian Hearing Services program
- Specific health services and human health biosecurity, such as human quarantine
- Alcohol and other drug strategy
- The National Disability Insurance Scheme and Foundational Supports
- Services for older adults and their carers
- Therapeutic goods and industrial chemicals regulation
- Gene technology
- Health provider compliance
- Blood and organ donation policy and funding
- Health workforce capacity, regulation and insurance indemnification
- Blood, organ policy and funding
- Active and healthy ageing policy and research, other than employment policies

== See also ==
- Therapeutic Goods Administration
- List of Australian Commonwealth Government entities
