= Aboriginal Australians =

One of the two categories of Indigenous Australians

- The Australian Aboriginal flag. It was proclaimed as a flag of Australia alongside the Torres Strait Islander flag in 1995.

Total population
- 944,171 (2021); 3.7% of Australia's population

Languages
- Several hundred Australian Aboriginal languages, many no longer spoken, Australian English, Australian Aboriginal English, Kriol

Religion
- 51% secular or other spiritual belief or no religious affiliation; 41% Christianity; and 1% traditional Aboriginal religion.

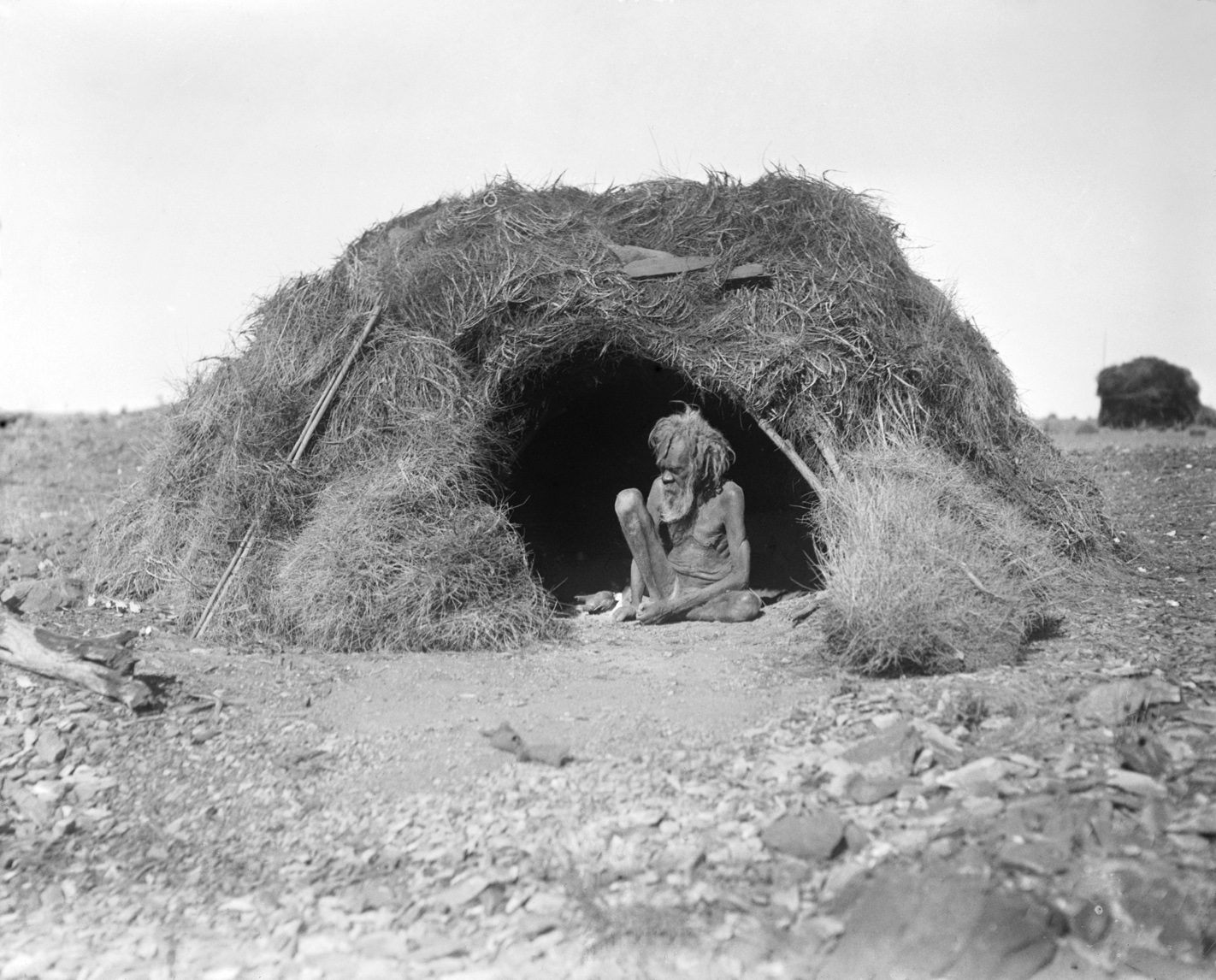
An Eastern Arrernte man of the Arltunga district, Northern Territory, in 1923. His hut is decked with porcupine grass.

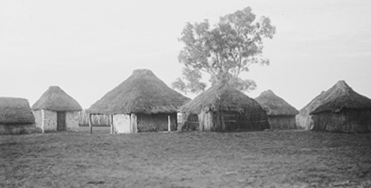
Dwellings accommodating Aboriginal families at Hermannsburg Mission, Northern Territory, 1923

Aboriginal Australians are the various indigenous peoples of the Australian mainland and many of its islands, excluding the ethnically distinct people of the Torres Strait Islands.

Humans first migrated to Australia 50,000 to 65,000 years ago, and over time formed as many as 500 linguistic and territorial groups. Aboriginal people once lived across large areas of the continental shelf that were later inundated by postglacial sea-level rise at the start of the Holocene inter-glacial period, reshaping coastal landscapes and separating Tasmania from the mainland. Aboriginal people maintained extensive networks within the continent and certain groups maintained relationships with Torres Strait Islanders and the Makassar people of modern-day Indonesia.

Over the millennia, Aboriginal people developed complex trade networks, inter-cultural relationships, law and religions, which make up some of the oldest continuous cultures in the world. At the time of European colonisation of Australia, the Aboriginal people spoke more than 250 different languages, possessed varying degrees of technology, and lived in various types of settlements. Languages (or dialects) and language-associated groups of people are connected with stretches of territory known as "Country", with which they have a profound spiritual connection.

Contemporary Aboriginal beliefs are shaped by traditional beliefs, the disruption of colonisation, religions brought to the continent by later migrants, and contemporary issues. Just over half hold secular or other spiritual beliefs or no religious affiliation; about 40% are Christian; and about 1% adhere to a traditional Aboriginal religion. Traditional cultural beliefs are passed down and shared through dancing, stories, songlines, and art that collectively weave an ontology of modern daily life and ancient creation known as the Dreaming.

Studies of Aboriginal groups' genetic makeup are ongoing, but evidence suggests that they have genetic inheritance from ancient Asian peoples. Aboriginal Australians and Papuans shared the same paleocontinent Sahul, although they became genetically distinct about 37,000 years ago. Aboriginal Australians have a broadly shared, complex genetic history, but only in the last 200 years have they been defined by others as, and started to self-identify as, a single group. Aboriginal identity has changed over time and place, with family lineage, self-identification, and community acceptance all of varying importance.

The 2021 census shows that there were 944,171 Aboriginal people, comprising 3.7% of Australia's population. (Note: This includes those who identified as both Aboriginal and Torres Strait Islander.) Over 80% of Aboriginal people today speak English at home, and about 77,000 speak an Indigenous language at home. Aboriginal people, along with Torres Strait Islander people, suffer a number of severe health and economic deprivations in comparison with the wider Australian community.

== Origins ==
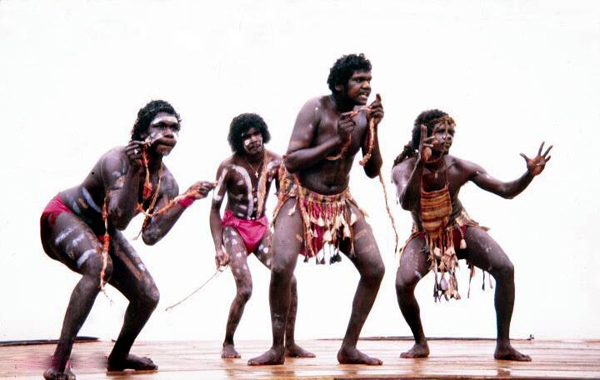
Arnhem Land Aboriginal dancers in 1981

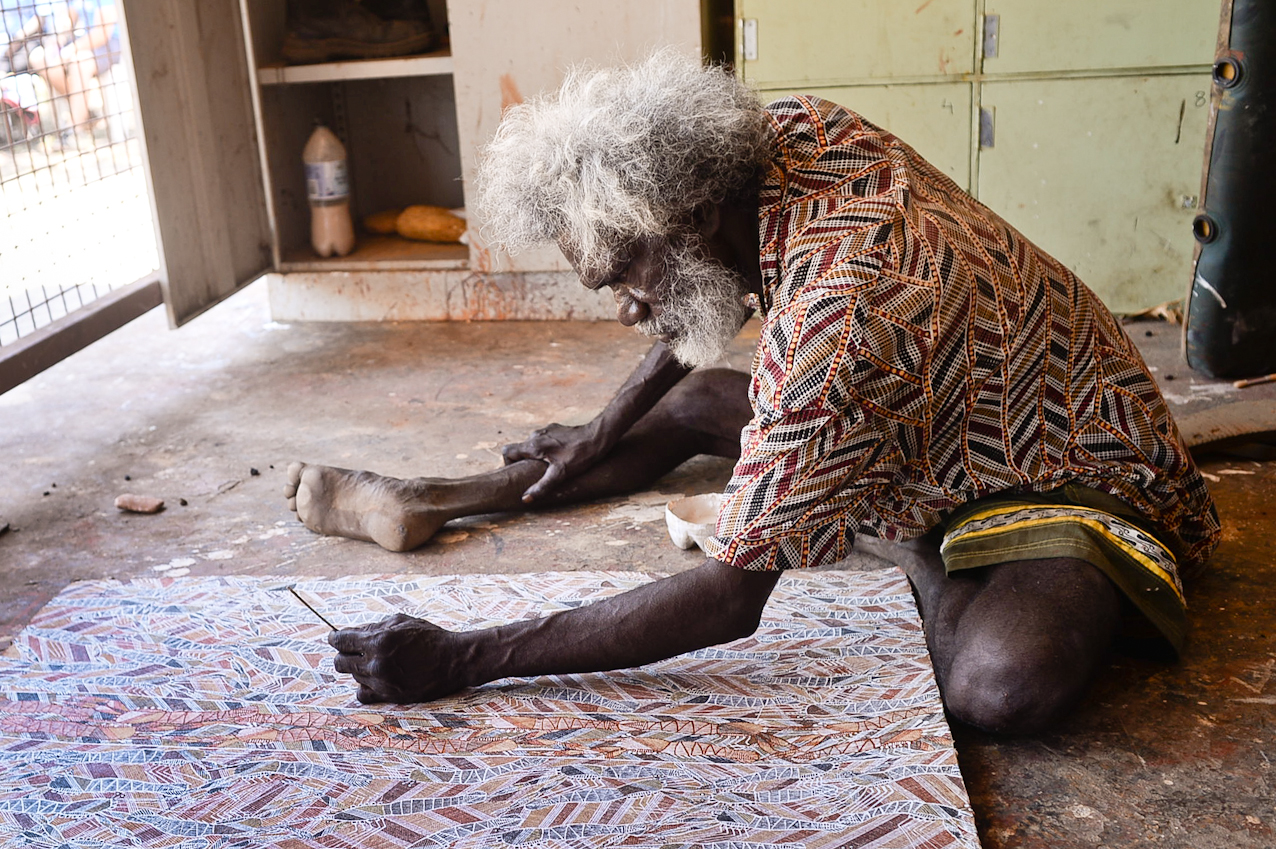
Arnhem Land artist Glen Namundja painting at Injalak Arts

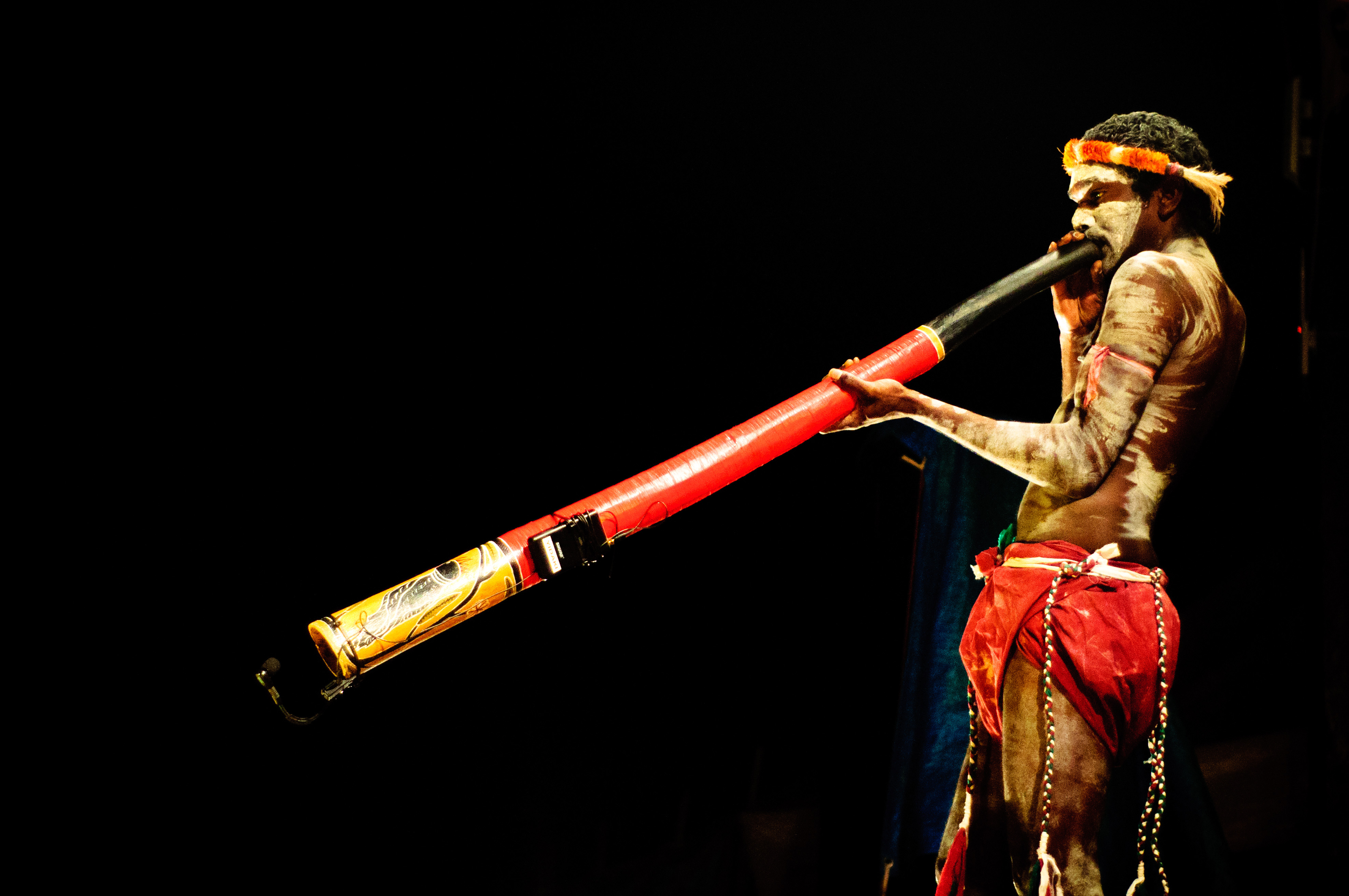
Didgeridoo player Ŋalkan Munuŋgurr performing with East Journey

Archeological evidence indicates that the ancestors of today's Aboriginal Australians first migrated to the continent 50,000 to 65,000 years ago. While there have been genomic studies placing arrival as late as 43,000 years ago, a 2025 study suggests that the peopling of Australia happened around 60,000 years ago, via two distinct routes. These settlers formed part of a single migration that diverged in Southeast Asia; they were ancestral to the Indigenous populations of Australia, New Guinea and Oceania, and were related to other East Eurasians rather than representing a separate wave.

Early human migration to Australia was achieved when it formed a part of the Sahul continent, connected to the island of New Guinea via a land bridge. This would have nevertheless required crossing the sea at the Wallace Line. It is also possible that people came by island-hopping via an island chain between Sulawesi and New Guinea, reaching North Western Australia via Timor. As sea levels rose, the people on the Australian mainland and nearby islands became increasingly isolated, some on Tasmania and some of the smaller offshore islands when the land was inundated at the start of the Holocene, the inter-glacial period that started about 11,700 years ago.

A 2021 study by researchers at the Australian Research Council Centre of Excellence for Australian Biodiversity and Heritage has mapped the likely migration routes of the peoples as they moved across the Australian continent to its southern reaches of what is now Tasmania (then part of the mainland). The modelling is based on data from archaeologists, anthropologists, ecologists, geneticists, climatologists, geomorphologists, and hydrologists. The new models suggest that the first people may have landed in the Kimberley region in what is now Western Australia about 60,000 years ago, and had settled across the continent within 6,000 years.

Aboriginal Australians may have one of the oldest continuous cultures on earth. In Arnhem Land in the Northern Territory, oral histories comprising complex narratives have been passed down by Yolngu people through hundreds of generations. The Aboriginal rock art, dated by modern techniques, shows that their culture has continued from ancient times.

=== Genetics ===
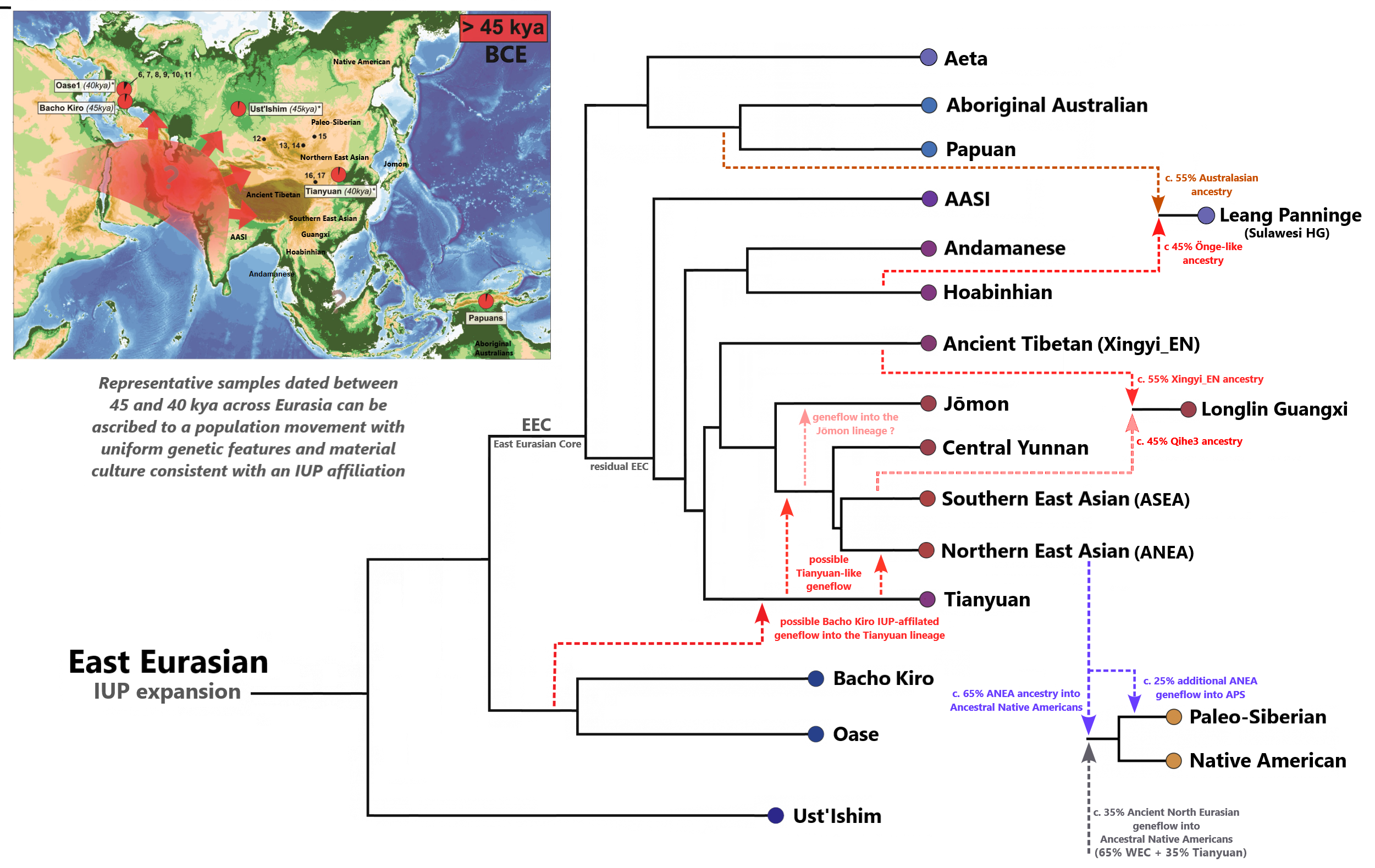
Phylogenetic position of the Aboriginal Australian lineage among other East Eurasians

Genetic studies have revealed that a population wave, termed East Eurasian Core, outgoing from the Iranian plateau during the Initial Upper Paleolithic period populated the Asia-Pacific region via a southern route dispersal. This wave is suggested to have expanded into the South and Southeast Asia region and subsequently diverged rapidly into the ancestors of Ancient Ancestral South Indians (AASI), Andamanese, East Asians, and Australasians, including Aboriginal Australians and Papuans. Aboriginal Australians are genetically most closely related to other Oceanians, such as Papuans and Melanesians, who are collectively referred to as "Australasians," which can be described as "a deeply branching East Asian lineage".

While the commonly accepted date for the diversification of modern humans following the Out of Africa migration is placed at 60–50,000 years ago, there is, however, evidence that Aboriginal Australians may carry ancestry from an earlier human diaspora (xOoA) that originated 75,000 to 62,000 years ago. This earlier group has been estimated to have possibly contributed around 2% ancestry to modern Aboriginal Australians.

Mallick et al. 2016 and Mark Lipson et al. 2017 found the bifurcation of Eastern Eurasians and Western Eurasians dates to at least 45,000 years ago, with indigenous Australians nested inside the Eastern Eurasian clade. Aboriginal Australians, together with Papuans, may either form a sister clade to a single mainland Asian clade consisting of the AASI, Andamanese and East Asians, and to the exclusion of West Eurasians, or alternatively are nested within the Eastern Eurasian cluster without a strong internal cladal structure against mainland Asian lineages.

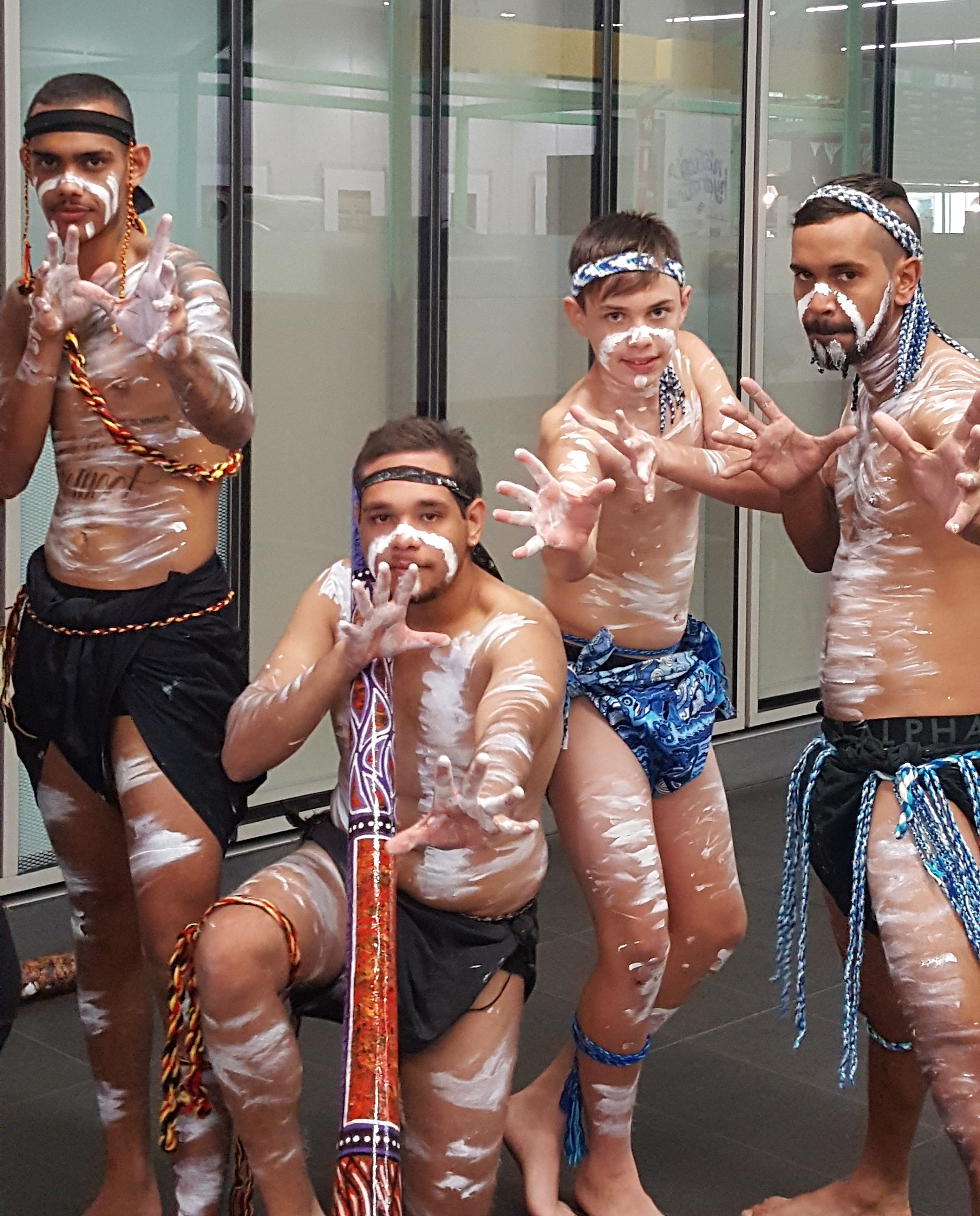
Noongar traditional dancers in Perth

Genetic data on indigenous populations of Borneo and Malaysia showed them to be more closely related to other mainland Asian groups, than compared to the groups from Papua New Guinea and Australia. This indicates that populations in Australia were isolated for a long time from the rest of Southeast Asia. They remained untouched by migrations and population expansions into that area, which can be explained by the Wallace line.

==== Uniparentals ====
The most common Y-chromosome haplogroups among Aboriginal Australians is C1b2, followed by haplogroups S and M; these latter haplogroups are also very frequent among Papuans.

==== Other studies ====
In a 2001 study, blood samples were collected from some Warlpiri people in the Northern Territory to study their genetic makeup (which is not representative of all Aboriginal peoples in Australia). The study concluded that the Warlpiri are descended from ancient Asians whose DNA is still somewhat present in Southeastern Asian groups, although greatly diminished. The Warlpiri DNA lacks certain information found in modern Asian genomes, and carries information not found in other genomes. This reinforces the idea of ancient Aboriginal isolation.

Genetic data extracted in 2011 by Morten Rasmussen et al., who took a DNA sample from an early-20th-century lock of an Aboriginal person's hair, found that the Aboriginal ancestors probably migrated through South Asia and Maritime Southeast Asia, into Australia, where they stayed. As a result, outside of Africa, the Aboriginal peoples have continuously occupied the same territory longer than any other human populations. These findings suggest that modern Aboriginal Australians are the direct descendants of the eastern wave, who left Africa up to 75,000 years ago.

The Rasmussen study also found evidence that Aboriginal peoples carry some genes associated with the Denisovans (a species of human related to but distinct from Neanderthals) of Asia; the study suggests that there is an increase in allele sharing between the Denisovan and Aboriginal Australian genomes, compared to other Eurasians or Africans. Examining DNA from a finger bone excavated in Siberia, researchers concluded that the Denisovans migrated from Siberia to tropical parts of Asia and that they interbred with modern humans in Southeast Asia 44,000 years BP, before Australia separated from New Guinea approximately 11,700 years BP. They contributed DNA to Aboriginal Australians and to present-day New Guineans and an indigenous tribe in the Philippines known as Mamanwa. This study confirms Aboriginal Australians as one of the oldest living populations in the world. They are possibly the oldest outside Africa, and they may have the oldest continuous culture on the planet.

A 2016 study at the University of Cambridge suggests that it was about 50,000 years ago that these peoples reached Sahul (the supercontinent consisting of present-day Australia and its islands and New Guinea). The sea levels rose and isolated Australia about 10,000 years ago, but Aboriginal Australians and Papuans diverged from each other earlier, genetically, about 37,000 years BP, possibly because the remaining land bridge was impassable. This isolation makes the Aboriginal people the world's oldest culture. The study also found evidence of an unknown hominin group, distantly related to Denisovans, with whom the Aboriginal and Papuan ancestors must have interbred, leaving a trace of about 4% in most Aboriginal Australians' genome. There is, however, increased genetic diversity among Aboriginal Australians based on geographical distribution.

Carlhoff et al. 2021 analysed a Holocene hunter-gatherer sample ("Leang Panninge") from South Sulawesi, which shares high amounts of genetic drift with Aboriginal Australians and Papuans. This suggests that a population split from the common ancestor of Aboriginal Australians and Papuans. The sample also shows genetic affinity with East Asians and the Andamanese people of South Asia. The authors note that this hunter-gatherer sample can be modelled with ~50% Australian/Papuan-related ancestry and either with ~50% East Asian or Andamanese Onge ancestry, highlighting the deep split between Leang Panninge and Aboriginal/Papuans. (Note: The qpGraph analysis confirmed this branching pattern, with the Leang Panninge individual branching off from the Near Oceanian clade after the Denisovan gene flow. The most supported topology indicates around 50% of a basal East Asian component contributing to the Leang Panninge genome (fig. 3c, supplementary figs. 7–11).)

Two genetic studies by Larena et al. 2021 found that Philippines Negrito people split from the common ancestor of Aboriginal Australians and Papuans before the latter two diverged from each other, but after their common ancestor diverged from the ancestor of East Asian peoples. Like Papuans, it's believed that Aboriginal Australians underwent a secondary admixture event with Altai-related Denisovan populations after they diverged from the ancestors of East Asians, who already mixed with Denisovans. This event was also separate from the admixture event experienced by Filipino Negritos, explaining why Aboriginal Australians and Papuans have relatively lower Denisovan ancestry.

Based on a reevaluation of mitogenomes, Gandini et al. 2025 proposed a "long chronology", which suggested an earlier settlement of Sahul by two migration routes about ~60 ka. One route came from northern Sunda via the Philippine archipelago whilst the other came from southern Sunda via Mainland Southeast Asia, with both routes ultimately tracing back to South Asia. The settlers that undertook these routes were ancestral to populations indigenous to Australia, New Guinea and Oceania, and were also related to other East Eurasians instead of belonging to a separate wave.

=== Changes about 4,000 years ago ===
The dingo reached Australia about 4,000 years ago. Near that time, there were changes in language (with the Pama-Nyungan language family spreading over most of the mainland), and in stone tool technology. Smaller tools were used. Human contact has thus been inferred, and genetic data of two kinds have been proposed to support a gene flow from India to Australia: first, signs of South Asian components in Aboriginal Australian genomes, reported on the basis of genome-wide SNP data; and second, the existence of a Y chromosome (male) lineage, designated haplogroup C∗, with the most recent common ancestor about 5,000 years ago.

The first type of evidence comes from a 2013 study by the Max Planck Institute for Evolutionary Anthropology using large-scale genotyping data from a pool of Aboriginal Australians, New Guineans, island Southeast Asians, and Indians. It found that the New Guinea and Mamanwa (Philippines area) groups diverged from the Aboriginal about 36,000 years ago (there is supporting evidence that these populations are descended from migrants taking an early "southern route" out of Africa, before other groups in the area). Also the Indian and Australian populations mixed long before European contact, with this gene flow occurring during the Holocene (c. 4,200 years ago). The researchers had two theories for this: either some Indians had contact with people in Indonesia who eventually transferred those Indian genes to Aboriginal Australians, or a group of Indians migrated from India to Australia and intermingled with the locals directly.

However, a 2016 study in Current Biology by Anders Bergström et al. excluded the Y chromosome as providing evidence for recent gene flow from India into Australia. The study authors sequenced 13 Aboriginal Australian Y chromosomes using recent advances in gene sequencing technology. They investigated their divergence times from Y chromosomes in other continents, including comparing the haplogroup C chromosomes. They found a divergence time of about 54,100 years between the Sahul C chromosome and its closest relative C5, as well as about 54,300 years between haplogroups K*/M and their closest haplogroups R and Q. The deep divergence time of 50,000-plus years with the South Asian chromosome and "the fact that the Aboriginal Australian Cs share a more recent common ancestor with Papuan Cs" excludes any recent genetic contact.

The 2016 study's authors concluded that, although this does not disprove the presence of any Holocene gene flow or non-genetic influences from South Asia at that time, and the appearance of the dingo does provide strong evidence for external contacts, the evidence overall is consistent with a complete lack of gene flow, and points to indigenous origins for the technological and linguistic changes. They attributed the disparity between their results and previous findings to improvements in technology; none of the other studies had utilised complete Y chromosome sequencing, which has the highest precision. For example, use of a ten Y STRs method has been shown to massively underestimate divergence times. Gene flow across the island-dotted 150-kilometre-wide (93 mi) Torres Strait, is both geographically plausible and demonstrated by the data, although at this point it could not be determined from this study when within the last 10,000 years it may have occurred—newer analytical techniques have the potential to address such questions.

Bergström's 2018 doctoral thesis looking at the population of Sahul suggests that other than relatively recent admixture, the populations of the region appear to have been genetically independent from the rest of the world since their divergence about 50,000 years ago. He writes "There is no evidence for South Asian gene flow to Australia .... Despite Sahul being a single connected landmass until [8,000 years ago], different groups across Australia are nearly equally related to Papuans, and vice versa, and the two appear to have separated genetically already [about 30,000 years ago]."

=== Environmental adaptations ===
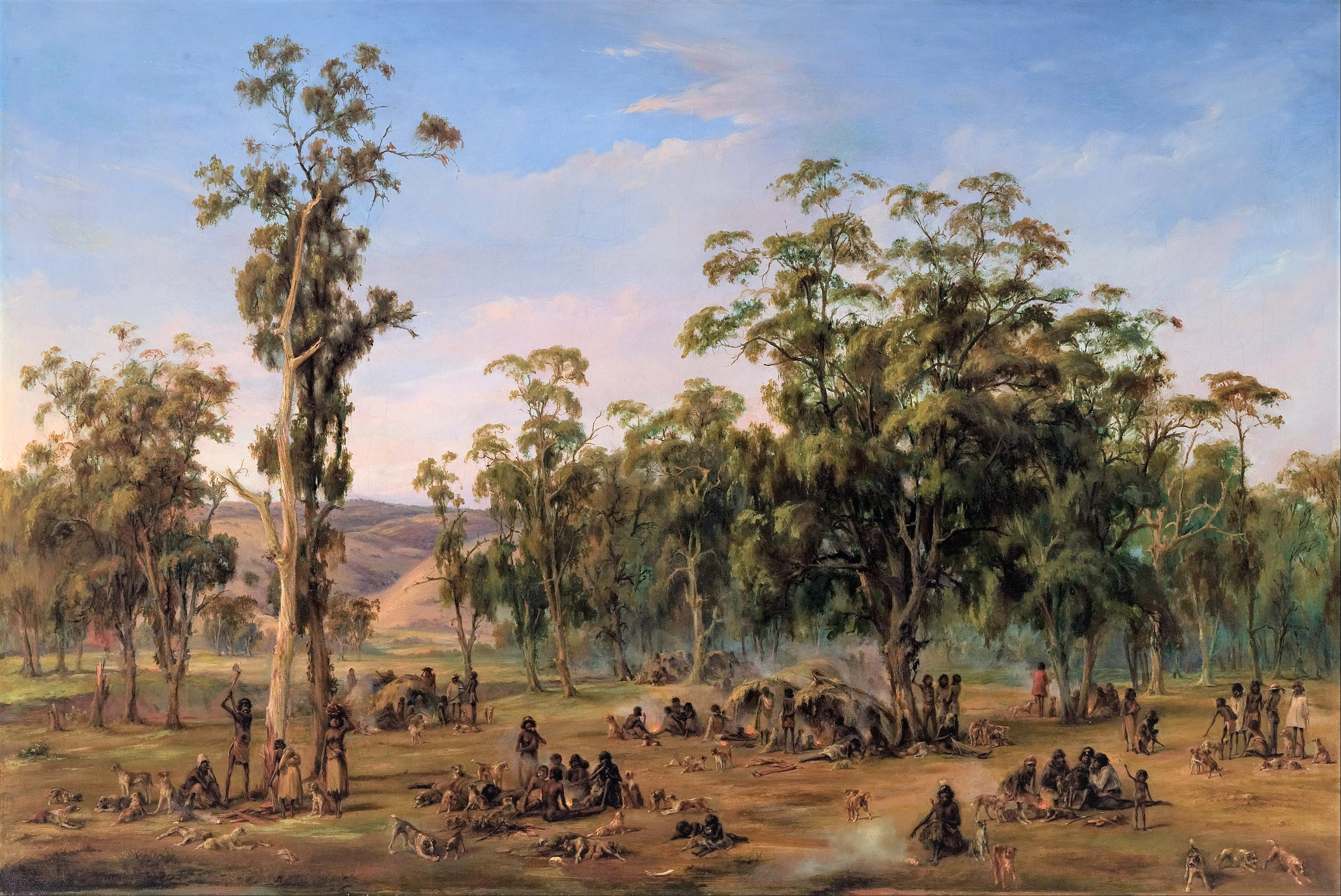
An Aboriginal encampment near the Adelaide foothills in an 1854 painting by Alexander Schramm

Aboriginal Australians possess inherited abilities to adapt to a wide range of environmental temperatures in various ways. A study in 1958 comparing cold adaptation in the desert-dwelling Pitjantjatjara people compared with a group of European people showed that the cooling adaptation of the Aboriginal group differed from that of the Europeans, and that they were able to sleep more soundly through a cold desert night. A 2014 Cambridge University study found that a beneficial mutation in two genes that regulate thyroxine, a hormone involved in regulating body metabolism, helps to regulate body temperature in response to fever. The effect of this is that the desert people are able to have a higher body temperature without accelerating the activity of the whole of the body, which can be especially detrimental in childhood diseases. This helps protect people to survive the side-effects of infection.

== Population history ==
=== Historical population ===
It is estimated that the Indigenous Australian population at the time of first European settlement numbered at least 314,500 people. After contact the Indigenous population started declining and continued to decline until reaching a nadir in 1921, after which point in time it has started to rebound and has eventually surpassed the pre-contact population size by the end of the 20th century:

Minimum estimates of the Aboriginal and Torres Strait Islander population for 1788-1971 and official estimates for 1996-2021
State / Territory	1788	1861	1881	1901	1921	1947	1954	1971	1996	2006	2011	2016	2021
New South Wales	48,000	16,000	10,000	7,434	9,350	14,500	17,500	28,500	109,925	152,685	208,476	265,685	339,710
Victoria	15,000	2,384	1,200	850	1,400	3,000	3,800	6,371	22,598	33,517	47,333	57,767	78,696
Queensland	120,000	60,000	40,000	27,500	22,500	27,500	32,000	46,000	104,817	144,885	188,954	221,276	273,119
South Australia	15,000	9,000	6,346	4,888	4,598	5,600	6,300	9,450	22,051	28,055	37,408	42,265	52,069
Western Australia	62,000	44,500	35,500	26,500	19,547	18,250	20,000	28,000	56,205	70,966	88,270	100,512	120,006
Tasmania	4,500	18	120	157	400	1,175	1,525	3,000	15,322	18,415	24,165	28,537	33,857
Northern Territory	50,000	48,500	38,500	27,235	17,809	16,875	18,750	28,500	51,876	64,005	68,850	74,546	76,487
Australian Capital Territory	-	-	-	-	33	100	173	255	3,058	4,282	6,160	7,513	9,525
Australia	314,500	180,402	131,666	94,564	75,637	87,000	100,048	150,076	386,049	517,043	669,881	798,365	983,709

=== Population growth and location ===
Based on the 2021 census, the Australian Bureau of Statistics estimates there were 901,655 Aboriginal Australians, and 42,516 who identified as both Aboriginal Australian and Torres Strait Islander. These groups comprise 3.7% of the total Australian population. 39,538 people identified as Torres Strait Islander, which is a different ethnic group from Aboriginal Australian.

Census counts and intercensal change Aboriginal and Torres Strait Islander persons, 2006–2021*
Census	Number of persons	Intercensal change (number)	Intercensal change (percentage)
2006	455,028	45,025	11.0
2011	548,368	93,340	20.5
2016	649,171	100,803	18.4
2021	812,728	163,557	25.2
*These are initial counts and differ from the final estimates, adjusted for undercounting.

Based on initial 2021 census counts, the Aboriginal and Torres Strait islander population grew 25.2%, since the previous census in 2016. Demographic factors – births, deaths and migration (Note: Population change due to overseas migration continued to account for less than 2 per cent of the Aboriginal and/or Torres Strait Islander population.) – accounted for 43.5% of the increase (71,086 people). In turn, 76.2% of that increase was attributed to people aged 0–19 years in 2021, broken down as 52.5% for 0–4 year olds (births since 2016) and 23.7% for 5–19 year olds.

Reasons for the increase in Aboriginal population also include non-demographic factors. These include changes in individuals' identification as Aboriginal or Torres Strait Islander in different censuses, and individuals completing a census form in 2021 but not in 2016. These factors accounted for 56.5% of the increase in the Aboriginal and Torres Strait Islander population. The increase was higher than observed between 2011 and 2016 (39.0%) and 2006–2011 (38.7%).

The distribution of the Aboriginal Australian population (including those who identify as both Aboriginal and Torres Strait Islander) by state and territory is: New South Wales (35.3%), Queensland (26.3%), Western Australia (12.5%), Victoria (8.1%), Northern Territory (8.0%), South Australia (5.4%), Tasmania (3.4%) and Australian Capital Territory (1.0%).

Indigenous Australians (including Torres Strait Islanders) are less likely to live in the major Australian cities than are non-Indigenous Australians (41% compared with 73%). They are more likely to live in remote or very remote areas (15% compared with 1.4%)

== Languages ==
Although humans arrived in Australia 50,000 to 65,000 years ago, it is possible that the ancestor language of existing Aboriginal languages is as recent as 12,000 years old. Over 250 Australian Aboriginal languages are thought to have existed at the time of first European contact.

As of 2021, 84% of Aboriginal and Torres Strait Islanders spoke only English at home. The National Indigenous Languages Survey (NILS) for 2018-19 found that more than 120 Indigenous language varieties were in use or being revived, although 70 of those in use are endangered. The 2021 census found that 167 Indigenous languages were spoken at home by 76,978 Indigenous Australians. NILS and the Australian Bureau of Statistics use different classifications for Indigenous Australian languages.

According to the 2021 census, the classifiable Aboriginal languages with the most speakers are Kriol (7,403), Djambarrpuyngu (3,839), Pitjantjatjara (3,399), Warlpiri (2,592), Murrinh Patha (2,063) and Tiwi (2,053). There were also over 10,000 people who spoke an Indigenous language that could not be further defined or classified.

=== Creoles ===
A number of English-based creoles have arisen in Australia after European contact, of which Kriol is among the strongest and fastest-growing Aboriginal languages. Kriol is spoken in the Northern Territory and Western Australia. It is estimated that there are 20,000 to 30,000 speakers of Indigenous creole languages.

=== Tasmanian languages ===
Before British colonisation, there were perhaps five to sixteen languages on Tasmania, possibly related to one another in four language families. The last speaker of a traditional Tasmanian language, Fanny Cochrane Smith, died in 1905. Palawa kani is an in-progress constructed language, built from a composite of surviving words from various Tasmanian Aboriginal languages.

=== Indigenous sign languages ===
Traditional Indigenous languages often incorporated sign systems to aid communication with the hearing impaired, to complement verbal communication, and to replace verbal communication when the spoken language was forbidden for cultural reasons. Many of these sign systems are still in use.

== Groups and sub-groups ==
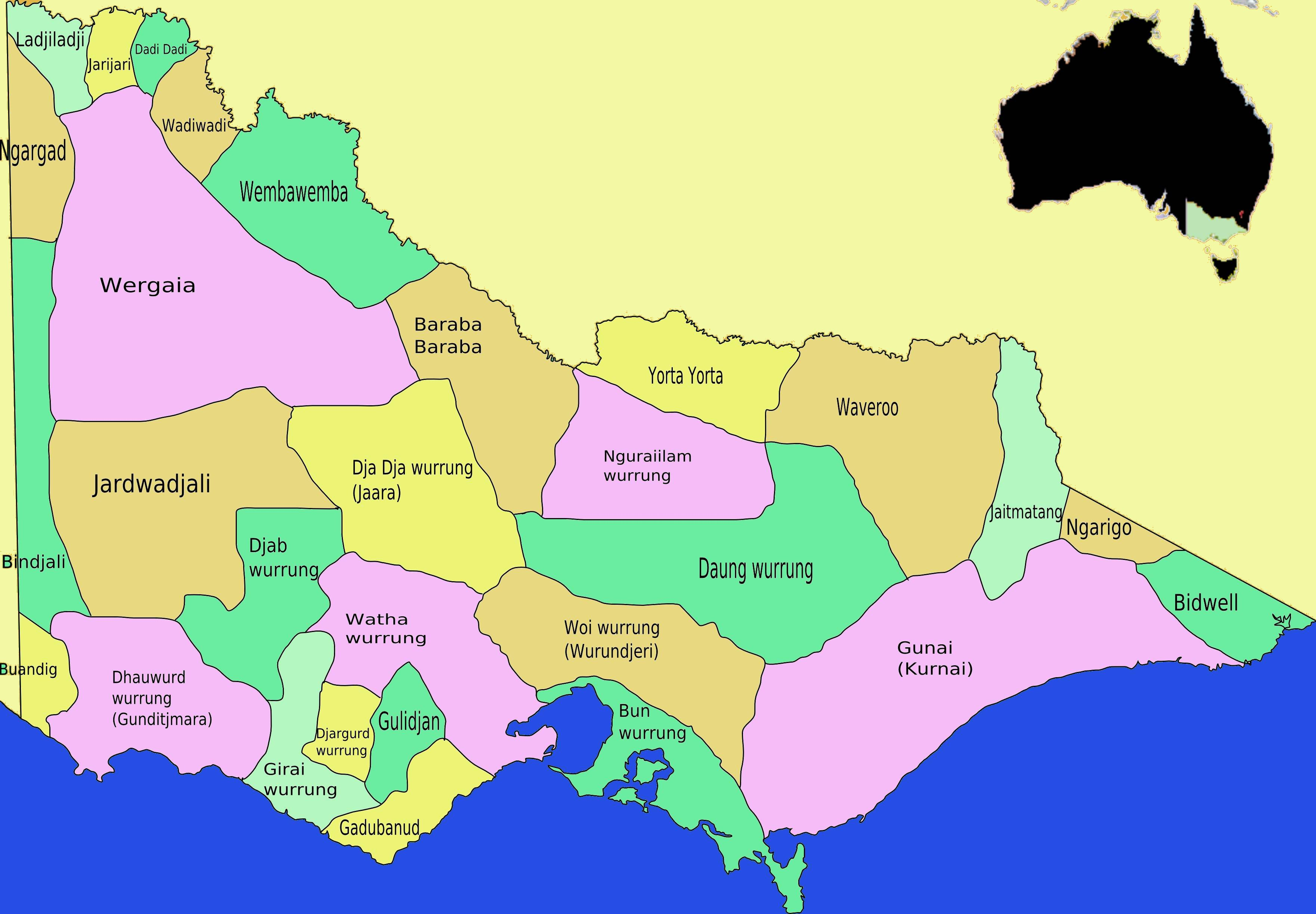
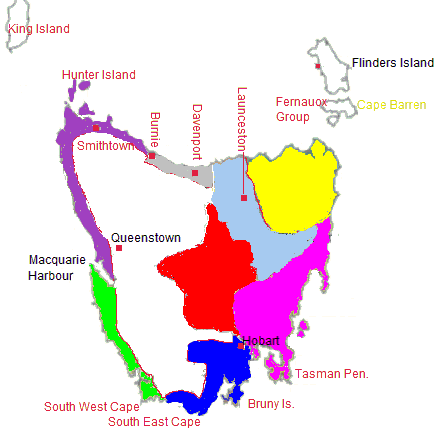
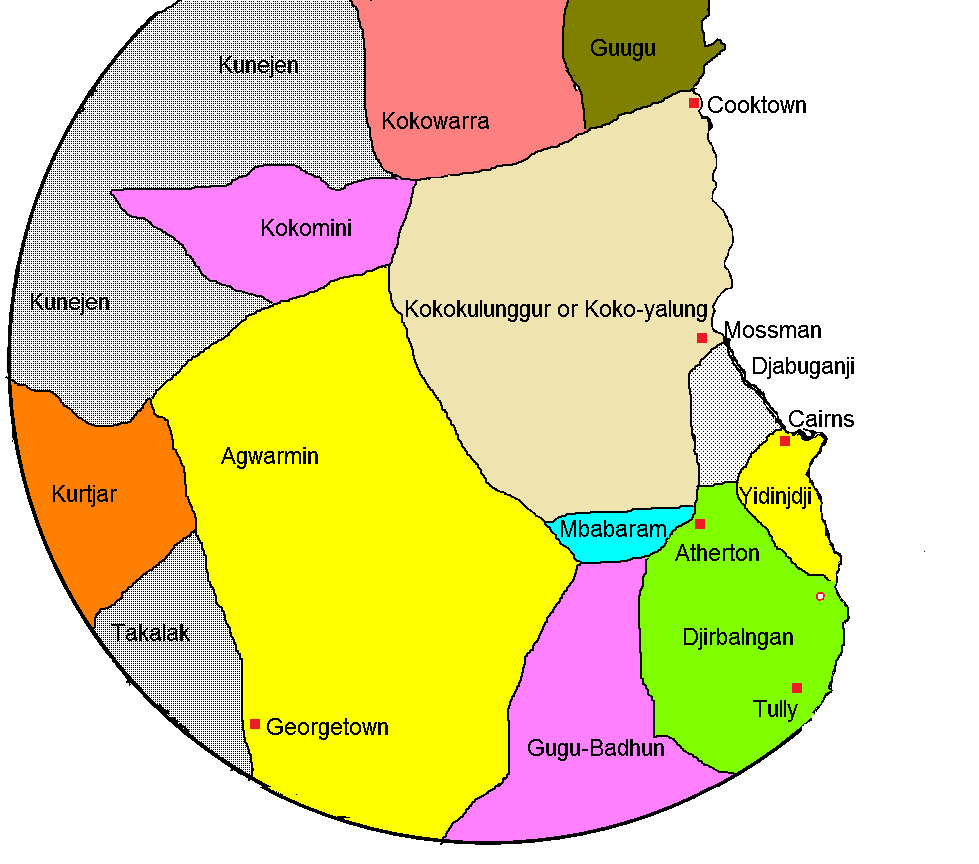
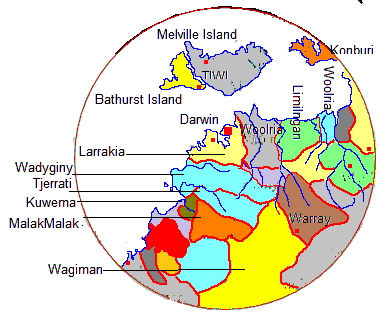
Clockwise from upper left: traditional lands Victoria, Tasmania, Darwin, Cairns

Dispersing across the Australian continent over time, the ancient people expanded and differentiated into distinct groups, each with its own language and culture. More than 400 distinct Australian Aboriginal peoples have been identified, distinguished by names designating their ancestral languages, dialects, or distinctive speech patterns. According to noted anthropologist, archaeologist and sociologist Harry Lourandos, historically, these groups lived in three main cultural areas, the Northern, Southern and Central cultural areas. The Northern and Southern areas, having richer natural marine and woodland resources, were more densely populated than the Central area.

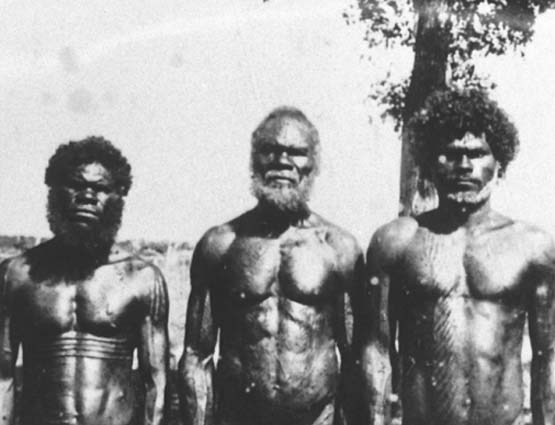
Men from Bathurst Island, 1939

=== Geographically-based names ===
There are various other names from Australian Aboriginal languages commonly used to identify groups based on geography, known as demonyms, including:

- Anangu in northern South Australia, and neighbouring parts of Western Australia and Northern Territory
- Goorie (variant pronunciation and spelling of Koori) in South East Queensland and some parts of northern New South Wales
- Koori (or Koorie) in New South Wales and Victoria (Aboriginal Victorians)
- Murri in Central and Northern Queensland, sometimes referring to all Aboriginal Queenslanders
- Nunga in southern South Australia
- Noongar in southern Western Australia
- Palawah (or Pallawah) in Tasmania
- Tiwi on Tiwi Islands off Arnhem Land (NT)

=== A few examples of sub-groups ===
Other group names are based on the language group or specific dialect spoken. These also coincide with geographical regions of varying sizes. A few examples are:

- Anindilyakwa on Groote Eylandt (off Arnhem Land), NT
- Arrernte in central Australia
- Bininj in Western Arnhem Land (NT)
- Gunggari in south-west Queensland
- Muruwari people in New South Wales
- Luritja (Kukatja), an Anangu sub-group based on language
- Ngunnawal in the Australian Capital Territory and surrounding areas of New South Wales
- Pitjantjatjara, an Anangu sub-group based on language
- Wangai in the Western Australian Goldfields
- Warlpiri (Yapa) in western central Northern Territory
- Yamatji in central Western Australia
- Yolngu in eastern Arnhem Land (NT)

=== Difficulties defining groups ===
However, these lists are neither exhaustive nor definitive, and there are overlaps. Different approaches have been taken by non-Aboriginal scholars in trying to understand and define Aboriginal culture and societies, some focusing on the micro-level (tribe, clan, etc.), and others on shared languages and cultural practices spread over large regions defined by ecological factors. Anthropologists have encountered many difficulties in trying to define what constitutes an Aboriginal people/community/group/tribe, let alone naming them. Knowledge of pre-colonial Aboriginal cultures and societal groupings is still largely dependent on the observers' interpretations, which were filtered through colonial ways of viewing societies.

Some Aboriginal peoples identify as one of several saltwater, freshwater, rainforest or desert peoples.

== Aboriginal identity ==
=== Terminology ===
The term Aboriginal Australians includes many distinct peoples who have developed across Australia for over 50,000 years. These peoples have a broadly shared, complex, genetic history, but it is only in the last two hundred years that they have been defined and have started to self-identify as a single group socio-politically. While some preferred the term Aborigine to Aboriginal in the past, as the latter was seen to have more directly discriminatory legal origins, use of the term Aborigine has declined in recent decades, as many consider the term an offensive and racist hangover from Australia's colonial era.

The definition of the term Aboriginal has changed over time and place, with family lineage, self-identification and community acceptance all being of varying importance.

The term Indigenous Australians refers to Aboriginal Australians and Torres Strait Islander peoples, and the term is conventionally only used when both groups are included in the topic being addressed, or by self-identification by a person as Indigenous. (Torres Strait Islanders are ethnically and culturally distinct, despite extensive cultural exchange with some of the Aboriginal groups, and the Torres Strait Islands are mostly part of Queensland but have a separate governmental status.) Some Aboriginal people object to being labelled Indigenous, as an artificial and denialist term, because some non-Aboriginal people have referred to themselves as indigenous because they were born in Australia.

=== Culture and beliefs ===
As of 2021, 51% of Indigenous people stated that they held a secular or other spiritual belief or no religious affiliation; 41% were affiliated to Christianity; and 1% were affiliated to a traditional Aboriginal religion.

Australian Indigenous people have beliefs unique to each mob (tribe) and have a strong connection to the land. Contemporary Indigenous Australian beliefs are a complex mixture, varying by region and individual across the continent. They are shaped by traditional beliefs, the disruption of colonisation, religions brought to the continent by Europeans, and contemporary issues. Traditional cultural beliefs are passed down and shared by dancing, stories, songlines and art—especially Papunya Tula (dot painting)—collectively telling the story of creation known as The Dreamtime. Additionally, traditional healers were also custodians of important Dreaming stories as well as their medical roles (for example the Ngangkari in the Western desert). Some core structures and themes are shared across the continent with details and additional elements varying between language and cultural groups. For example, in The Dreamtime of most regions, a spirit creates the earth then tells the humans to treat the animals and the earth in a way that is respectful to land. In Northern Territory this spirit is commonly said to be a huge snake or snakes that weaved its way through the earth and sky making the mountains and oceans. But in other places the spirits who created the world are known as wandjina rain and water spirits. Major ancestral spirits include the Rainbow Serpent, Baiame, Dirawong and Bunjil. Similarly, the Arrernte people of central Australia believed that humanity originated from great superhuman ancestors who brought the sun, wind and rain as a result of breaking through the surface of the Earth when waking from their slumber.

Many Dreamtime stories are still believed by many Indigenous Australians to this day.

== Health and economic deprivations ==
Taken as a whole, Aboriginal Australians, along with Torres Strait Islander people, have a number of health and economic deprivations in comparison with the wider Australian community.

Due to the aforementioned disadvantage, Aboriginal Australian communities experience a higher rate of suicide, as compared to non-indigenous communities. These issues stem from a variety of different causes unique to indigenous communities, such as historical trauma, socioeconomic disadvantage, and decreased access to education and health care. Also, this problem largely affects indigenous youth, as many indigenous youth may feel disconnected from their culture.

To combat the increased suicide rate, many researchers have suggested that the inclusion of more cultural aspects into suicide prevention programs would help to combat mental health issues within the community. Past studies have found that many indigenous leaders and community members, do in fact, want more culturally-aware health care programs. Similarly, culturally-relative programs targeting indigenous youth have actively challenged suicide ideation among younger indigenous populations, with many social and emotional wellbeing programs using cultural information to provide coping mechanisms and improving mental health.

== Viability of remote communities ==
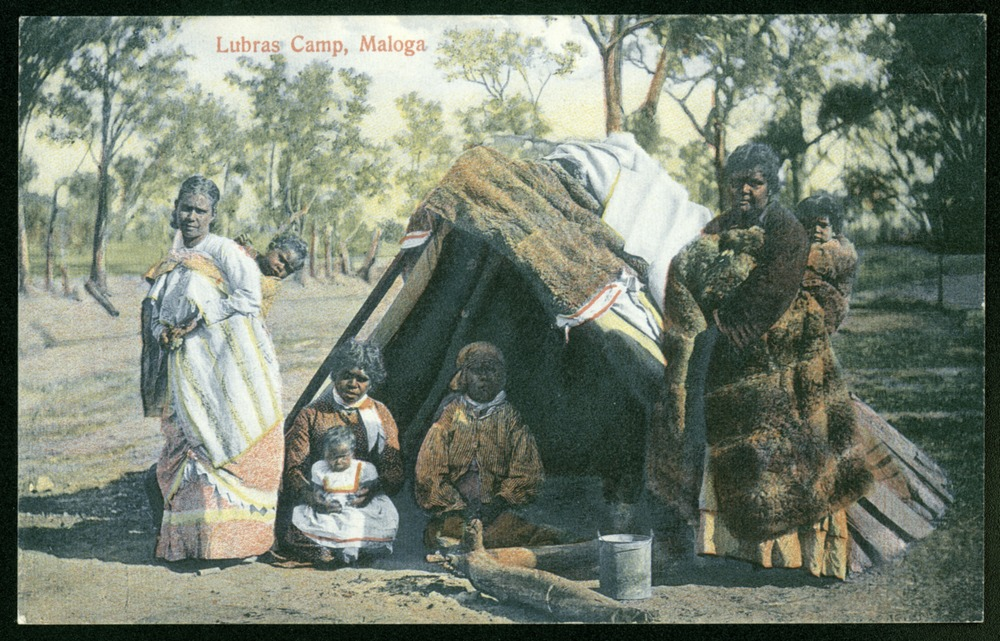
Historical image of Aboriginal Australian women and children, Maloga, New South Wales around 1900 (in European dress)

The outstation movement of the 1970s and 1980s, when Aboriginal people moved to tiny remote settlements on traditional land, brought health benefits, but funding them proved expensive, training and employment opportunities were not provided in many cases, and support from governments dwindled in the 2000s, particularly in the era of the Howard government.

Indigenous communities in remote Australia are often small, isolated towns with basic facilities, on traditionally owned land. These communities have between 20 and 300 inhabitants and are often closed to outsiders for cultural reasons. The long-term viability and resilience of Aboriginal communities in desert areas has been discussed by scholars and policy-makers. A 2007 report by the CSIRO stressed the importance of taking a demand-driven approach to services in desert settlements, and concluded that "if top-down solutions continue to be imposed without appreciating the fundamental drivers of settlement in desert regions, then those solutions will continue to be partial, and ineffective in the long term."

== See also ==
- Aboriginal Centre for the Performing Arts (ACPA)
- Aboriginal cultures of Western Australia
- Aboriginal South Australians
- Australian Aboriginal culture
- Australian Aboriginal kinship
- Australian Aboriginal religion and mythology
- Climate change in Australia
- First Nations Media Australia
- Indigenous Australian art
- Indigenous Australian music
- Indigenous land rights in Australia
- List of Aboriginal missions in New South Wales
- List of Indigenous Australian firsts
- List of Indigenous Australian politicians
- List of Indigenous Australians in politics and public service
- List of massacres of Indigenous Australians
- Lists of Indigenous Australians
- National Aboriginal & Torres Strait Islander Art Award
- Native title in Australia
- Stolen Generations
- Supply Nation
