= Office of Aboriginal and Torres Strait Islander Health =

The Office of Aboriginal and Torres Strait Islander Health, often known by its acronym OATSIH, was a division of the Australian Government's Department of Health and Ageing. It was set up in 1994 in the then Department of Human Services and Health to give a greater focus on the health needs of Indigenous Australians in mainstream health programs.

On 1 July 1995, following a Government decision to transfer responsibility for Aboriginal and Torres Strait Islander health from the Aboriginal and Torres Strait Islander Commission (ATSIC) to the Health portfolio, the Office assumed responsibility for providing funding to Aboriginal community controlled health and substance misuse services previously administered by ATSIC.

The long-term strategy of the Office was to improve the access of Aboriginal and Torres Strait Islander peoples to comprehensive primary health care services. The aim is to provide coordinated clinical care, population health and health promotion activities to facilitate illness prevention, early intervention and effective disease management.

== Successor ==
At some time before 2019, this division was subsumed into the Department of Health, which funds programs to help meet the targets of the Closing the Gap strategy.
