= Anyinginyi Health Aboriginal Corporation =

- Founded: 1984
- Type: Non-Profit Organization
- Purpose: Aboriginal health
- Headquarters: Tennant Creek, Australia
- Location: Northern Territory

Anyinginyi Health Aboriginal Corporation is an Aboriginal health service in Tennant Creek in the Northern Territory of Australia.

== History ==
Anyinginyi Congress Aboriginal Corporation was established in 1984 to reduce poverty, social and economic disadvantage and increase health outcomes for the region. Anyinginyi is word of the Warumungu language meaning “belonging to us". Its name was changed to Anyinginyi Health Aboriginal Corporation in 2003.

Anyinginyi is a community-controlled Aboriginal health organisation which is governed by an Indigenous Board of Directors. The current chair is Ross Jakamarra Williams. While based in Tennant Creek, Anyinginyi also offers maternal health, eye health, substance misuse, mental health, dental and allied health services to 10 other communities.

Anyinginyi moved into a custom-built health centre opened in April 2010, which increased client numbers to over 7,500 people and increase of by over 50 per cent.

Well known former employees include Leader of the Greens Richard Di Natale.
