= No Jab, No Pay =

Australian policy initiative

No Jab No Pay is an Australian policy initiative begun in 2016 which withholds three state payments – Child Care Benefit, the Child Care Rebate and a portion of the fortnightly Family Tax Benefit part A per child – for parents of children under 20 years of age who are not fully immunised or on a recognised catch-up schedule.

No Jab No Play is a related policy that disallows unvaccinated children from attending preschool and childcare centres, and imposes fines on childcare centres that admit unvaccinated children. The system allows exemptions for children who cannot be safely vaccinated for medical reasons.

== History ==
The policies grew out of a campaign championed by News Limited, in 2013. It was boosted by parent activists representing children who had died of preventable disease, notably the families of Riley Hughes and Dana McCaffery, infants who died of pertussis, leading to a backlash of harassment and trolling from anti-vaccination activists. Far-right politician Pauline Hanson also opposed the policy, though she later gave in to political pressure and backed the policy, and clarified that she supports vaccination. The campaign was a response to a rise in "conscientious objections", which had reached record levels particularly in the Sunshine Coast area of Queensland, where early attempts to pass legislation were knocked back in 2014. Efforts to circumvent the legislation included the founding of more fake religions, of which the best known, the "Church of Conscious Living", was promoted by anti-vaccine group the Australian Vaccination Network (since renamed to Australian Vaccination-risks Network after legal action over its deceptive name), and by anti-vaccination activist Stephanie Messenger.

No Jab No Pay was legislated in 2015, came into effect January 1, 2016, and was expanded in July 2018. By July 2016, 148,000 children who had not previously been fully immunised, were meeting the new requirements.

No Jab No Play was introduced at the state level, in New South Wales, Queensland and Victoria in 2017, leading to an immediate though small rise in immunisation rates, with Western Australia, which has some of the lowest vaccination rates in the country, following in December 2018.

== Impact ==
Public health researchers have had mixed evaluations of No Jab, No Pay and No Jab, No Play. Removing non-medical exemptions from vaccine requirements have been questioned on ethical grounds, the potential for coercive policies to lead to an increase in anti-vaccination sentiment, and the inequity of policy based on welfare conditionality. A study on the impact of removing conscientious objection from financial payments and childcare enrolments found that the policies led to a significant increase in childhood vaccination above the pre-intervention trend. The effect of the policies were larger in areas with lower socio-economic status, higher rates of government benefits, and higher pre-intervention coverage rates. A study of adolescent catch-up vaccination found that No Jab No Pay resulted in a large rise in catch-up vaccination. A 2022 study examined the effect of No Jab No Play policies on vaccine adherence with a study design that isolated the effect of No Jab No Play policies distinct from federal mandates found that childcare mandate policies had a small positive impact on uptake.

== See also ==
- Northern Rivers Vaccination Supporters
- Vaccine policy
- Vaccine hesitancy
