= Vaccination and religion =

Religious attitudes towards the use of vaccination

The relationship between vaccination and religion is complex and multifaceted. While most major religions have issued statements supportive of vaccination, and no major religion explicitly prohibits vaccinations, some individuals cite religious adherence as a basis for opting not to vaccinate themselves or their children. Historically, both pro- and anti-vaccination groups have used religious arguments to support their positions. For instance, in Australia, anti-vaccinationists founded the Church of Conscious Living, a "fake church", in an attempt to claim religious exemptions, which ultimately led to the removal of such exemptions in the country. Similarly, a United States pastor has been reported to offer vaccine exemptions in exchange for church membership.

== Historical ==
=== Early religious influences on vaccination ===
One of the earliest documented cases of variolation involved a Buddhist nun (bhikkhuni) between 1022 and 1063 CE. She ground smallpox scabs into a fine powder and administered it through the nostrils of an uninfected person to promote immunity. Centuries later, the 14th Dalai Lama continued the tradition of disease prevention by personally supporting polio vaccination campaigns.

=== Religious figures and advocacy for vaccination ===
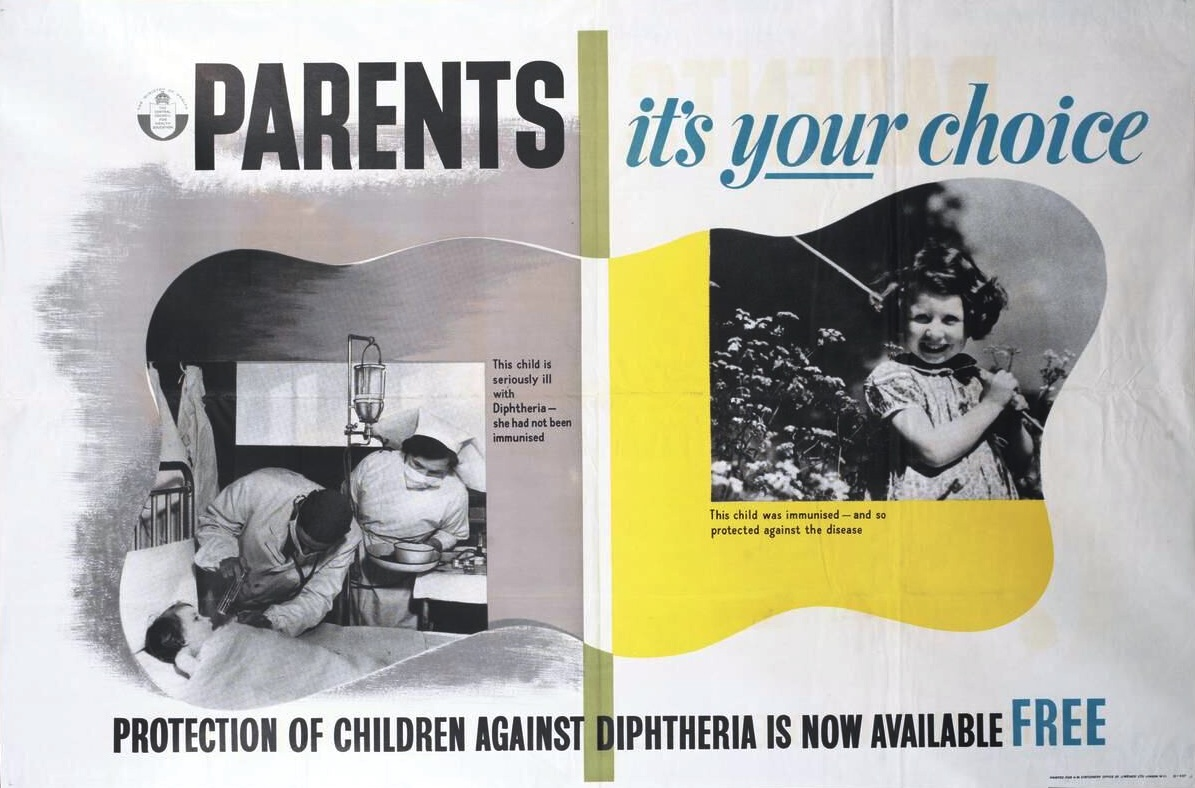
Article depicting an ill, non-immunized child with diphtheria on the left compared to an active immunized child on the right encouraging parents to vaccinate their children

In 1721, the influential Massachusetts preacher Cotton Mather was the first known person to attempt smallpox inoculation on a large scale, inoculating himself and more than two hundred members of his congregation with the help of a local doctor. While his view later became standard, there was a strong negative reaction against him at the time.

Rowland Hill (1744–1833) was a popular English preacher acquainted with Edward Jenner, the pioneer of smallpox vaccination, and he encouraged the vaccination of the congregations he visited or preached to. He published a tract on the subject in 1806, at a time when many medical men refused to sanction it. Later he became a member of the Royal Jennererian Society, which was established when vaccination was accepted in Britain, India, the US, and elsewhere. John C. Lettsom, an eminent Quaker physician of the day wrote to Rowland Hill commenting:

You have done more good than you imagine; and for everyone you may have saved by your actual operation, you have saved ten by your example; and perhaps, next to Jenner, have been the means of saving more lives than any other individual.

In 1804 during an outbreak of smallpox in New Spain Fr. Manuel Abad y Queipo personally paid for and brought the smallpox vaccine from the Capital to Valladolid.

In 1816 Iceland made the clergy responsible for smallpox vaccination and gave them the responsibility of keeping vaccination records for their parishes; Sweden also had similar practices.

Catholic and Anglican missionaries vaccinated Northwest Coast Native Americans during an 1862 smallpox epidemic.

=== Religious opposition to vaccination ===
In 1798, several Boston clergymen and devout physicians formed a society that opposed vaccination. Others complained that the practice was dangerous, going so far as to demand that doctors who carried out these procedures be tried for attempted murder.

When vaccination was introduced into UK public policy, and adoption followed overseas, there was opposition from trade unionists and others, including sectarian ministers and those interested in self-help and alternative medicines like homeopathy.

Anti-vaccinationists were most common in Protestant countries. Those who were religious often came from minority religious movements outside of mainstream Protestantism, including Quakers in England and Baptists in Sweden.

Jehovah's Witnesses condemned the practice of vaccination in 1931 as "a direct violation of the everlasting covenant that God made with Noah after the flood", but reversed that policy in 1952. The decision of whether to vaccinate themselves or their family is left to individuals. Some more recent Jehovah's Witness publications have mentioned the success of vaccination programs.

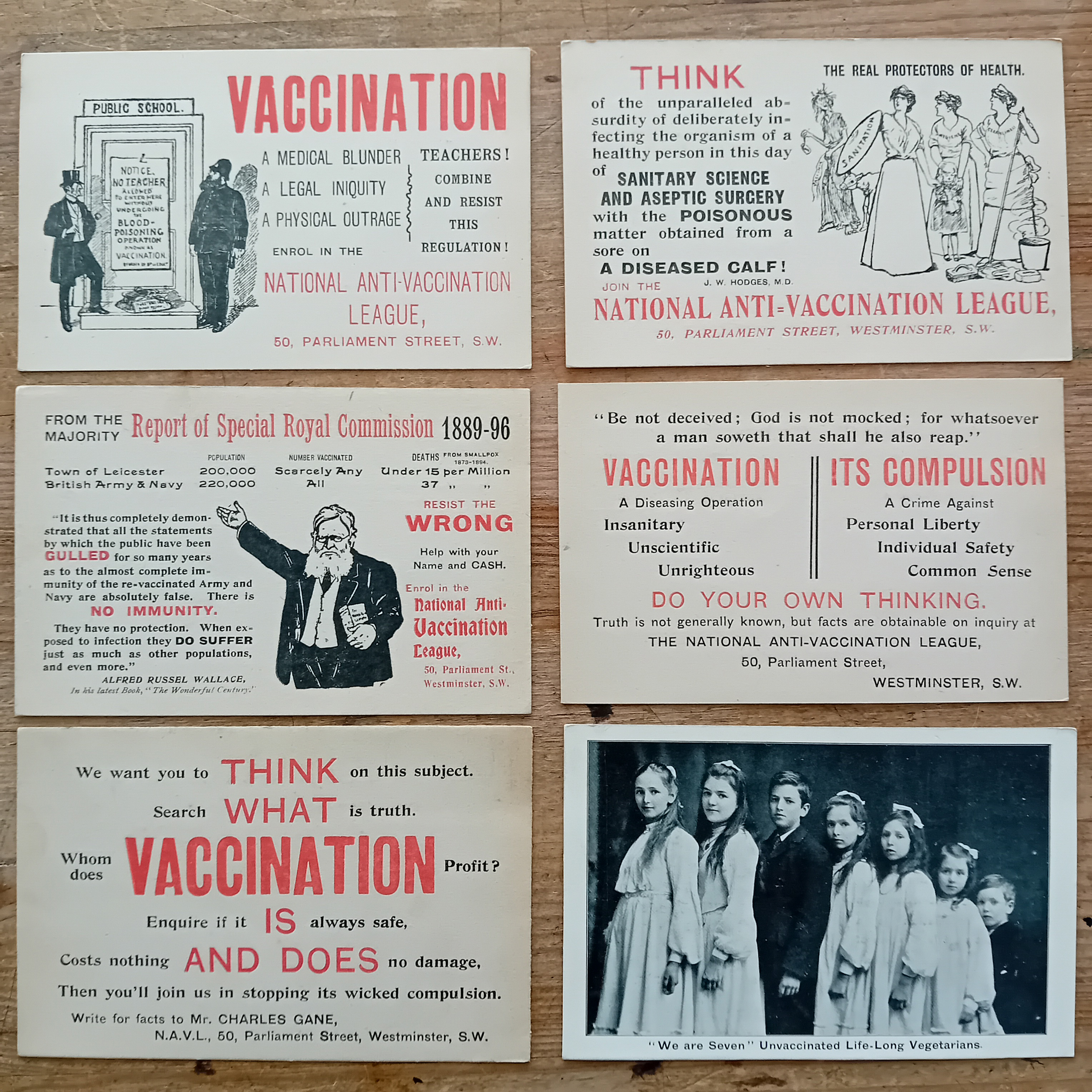
Anti-vaccination league postcards from Westminster, England in the 1890s

=== Legislation and religious exemptions ===
In the UK, a number of Vaccination Acts were introduced to control vaccination and inoculation, starting in 1840, when smallpox inoculation was banned. The 1853 Act introduced compulsory free infant vaccination enforced by local authorities. By 1871, infant vaccination was compulsory and parents refusing to have their child vaccinated were fined and imprisoned if the fines were not paid. Resistance to compulsion grew, and in 1889, after riots in Leicester, a Royal Commission was appointed and issued six reports between 1892 and 1896. It recommended the abolition of cumulative penalties. This was done in an 1898 Act, which also introduced a conscience clause that exempted parents who did not believe vaccination was efficacious or safe. This extended the concept of the "conscientious objector" in English law. A further Act in 1907 made it easier to obtain exemption.

== Current ==
=== Christianity ===
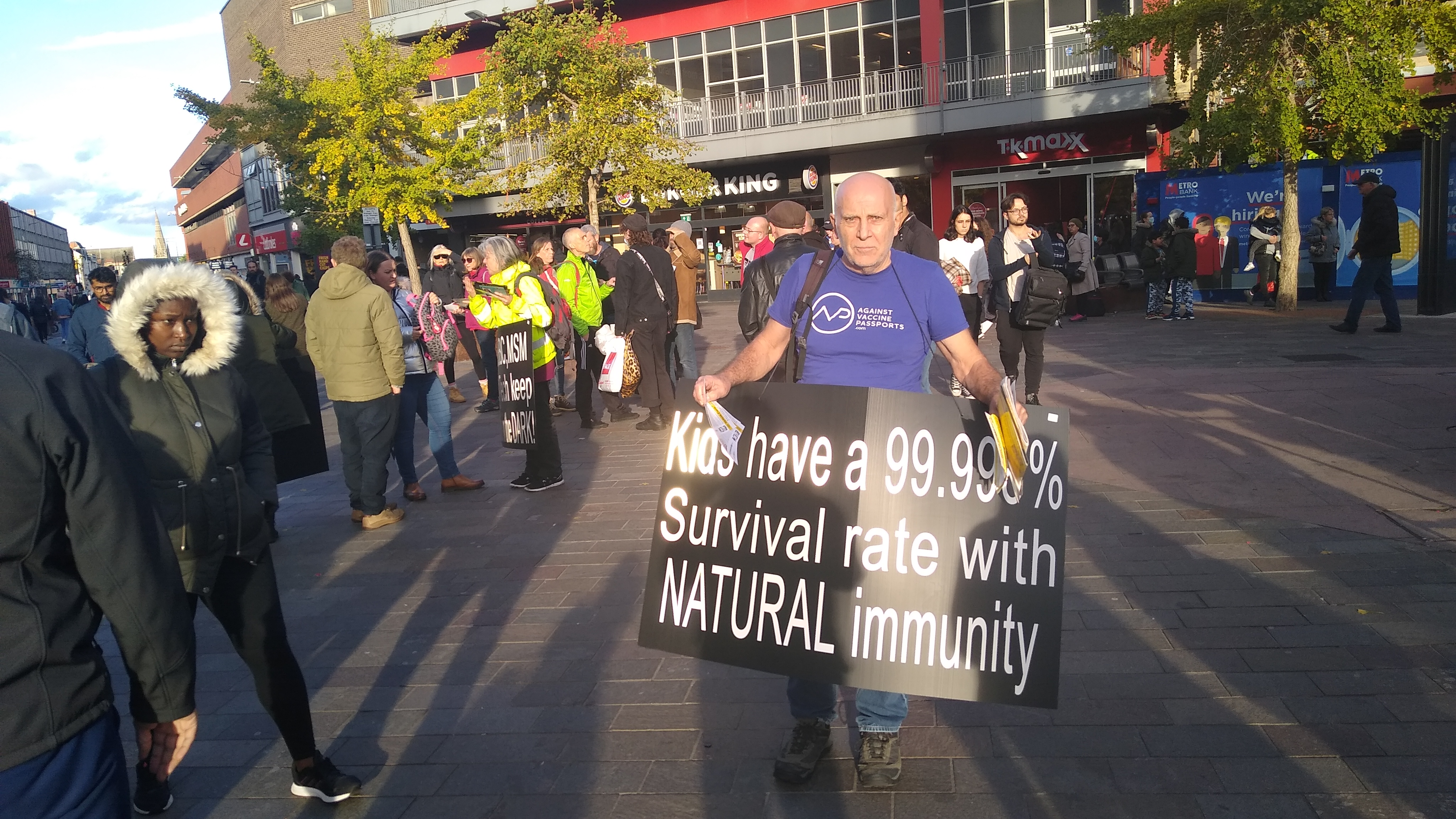
Anti-vaccination protester holding a sign that states, "Kids have a 99.9% Survival rate with NATURAL immunity".

==== Conservative Christian groups ====
Some conservative Christian groups in the United States oppose mandatory vaccination for diseases typically spread via sexual contact, arguing that the possibility of disease deters risky sexual contact. For example, the Family Research Council opposes mandatory vaccination against HPV, a sexually transmitted virus that causes various cancers: "Our primary concern is with the message that would be delivered to nine- to twelve-year-olds with the administration of the vaccines. Care must be taken not to communicate that such an intervention makes all sex 'safe'." This opposition is due to overarching ideological conflicts with the notion of the need to vaccinate against HPV, such as Christian sexual norms and parental obligations to "enforce the sexual norms" upon their children. These sexual norms are based on the Christian belief and biblical verse that individuals should not partake in premarital sex, promiscuity, or any other forms of sexual immorality, as stated by 1 Corinthians 7:2 (NIV). Although the verse does not explicitly mention premarital sex, it is widely interpreted to suggest that individuals should not have sexual relations outside of marriage. By taking the HPV vaccine, conservative Christians believe that the vaccination itself may promote increased sexual activity due to the notion that they are more "protected" from HPV infections. However, studies have suggested that HPV vaccination does not result in increased sexual activity or sexual behaviors.

==== Support for vaccination ====
Other Christians have supported vaccinations and mask wearing in the wake of COVID-19 to stop the spread of the disease, even using scripture to support the position.In 2021, the former director of the National Institute of Health, Francis Collins, a practicing Christian, expressed his support for the COVID-19 vaccine, stating that the development of vaccines are a “gift from God” and an “answer to prayer”.Additionally, Dr. Peter Mack, a physician at Novant Health South Park Family Physicians, cites Genesis 41, the story of David and Goliath, as a justification that vaccines are a “modern tool from God”. Other religious leaders from around the world, such as the Pope and some American bishops, expressed support for the COVID-19 vaccine during the height of the pandemic. In 2021, then-Pope Francis advocated for individuals to take the COVID-19 injections because it was a "moral obligation" or a "moral responsibility" to protect the health and safety of others. Pope Francis also stated in a series of Tweets that COVID-19 vaccinations are an "act of love" for others, while also suggesting that opposition to the vaccines, no matter the ideological, religious, or political basis, was considered "suicidal denialism, as rejecting the vaccine puts both the individual and others in the community at risk of developing COVID-19.

==== The church of Jesus Christ of Latter-Day Saints ====
The Church of Jesus Christ of Latter-day Saints has made vaccination an official initiative in its humanitarian relief program. The Church has also called on its members to see that their own children are properly vaccinated. In March 2021, the Church added encouragement to vaccinate to its General Handbook of Instructions, noting that "Vaccinations administered by competent medical professionals protect health and preserve life. ... Members of the Church are encouraged to safeguard themselves, their children, and their communities through vaccination." In August 2021, the Church again encouraged vaccination, specifically against COVID-19, in a public statement from the First Presidency: "We know that protection from [Covid and its variants] can only be achieved by immunizing a very high percentage of the population.... To provide personal protection from such severe infections, we urge individuals to be vaccinated."

==== Christian science ====
Although the Church of Christ, Scientist encourages reliance on prayer, it does not outright forbid vaccination or any other medical practice, and in 2015 it did not renew its application for religious exemption for vaccinations in Australia because it deemed the exemption "no longer current or necessary". During the COVID-19 pandemic, the Church of Christ did not make an official statement in support of the COVID-19 vaccine or an outright condemnation, even though the organization as a whole once advocated for religious exemptions for vaccinations in Australia. However, much of the vaccine hesitancy within the Christian Science community originates from religious beliefs rather than secular vaccine opposition. The decisions to vaccinate are up to the individuals themselves and not directly banned by the Church of Christ institution. Some members may reject vaccines or other medical procedures/interventions due to their belief that the onset of diseases are merely illusions, as humans are the reflection of the image of God. Therefore, according to that belief, diseases don’t exist and vaccines aren’t necessary to protect the health of the individual.

=== Islam and Judaism ===
==== Dietary concerns and medical exceptions ====
Islam and Judaism, religions with dietary prohibitions that regard particular animals as unclean, make exceptions for medical treatments derived from those animals. However, this may not be universally accepted due to a lack of central authority in these religions. For example, in Aceh Province, an autonomous province of Indonesia with its own Islamic Sharia Law, eighty percent of people refuse all vaccinations due to concerns about pig, or its derivatives, being used to make some vaccines (eating pig is considered haram). The hesitancy due to non-halal derivatives extended to the rotavirus vaccine, where some religious leaders in Indonesia opposed the rotavirus vaccination even though they had acknowledged the severity of the rotavirus symptoms. This led to the Indonesian Ulama Council in Jakarta, Indonesia, to pass an atwa, or fatwa, or an Islamic religious law, in 2018, successfully banning the measles and rubella vaccine. This led to the subsequent decrease in immunization rates for the MR vaccine, dropping to 68% for children vaccinated for MR and only 8% in some regions.

During the COVID-19 pandemic, many Ulamas, or Islamic scholars and theologians, enacted fatwas in some Muslim countries regarding the permissibility of taking the newly developed COVID-19 vaccine due to concerns that the pharmaceutical industry that produces the vaccines use haram or non-halal ingredients, such as pork derivatives. Essentially, in order for the vaccines to be halal, they must be formulated according to Sharia law, meaning that the vaccine ingredients must not contain haram animal products and other non-halal impurities. In Indonesia specifically, the Indonesian Ulama Council enacted a fatwa in March of 2021 which classified AstraZeneca’s COVID-19 vaccine as “haram permittable”. This acknowledges that the vaccine is definitely haram due to the use of porcine trypsin during vaccine formulation, but it is still “permitted for use” due to the severity of the pandemic during that time. There were no effective alternatives that is completely halal or does not use haram ingredients, so the fatwa provided an exception for taking the vaccine to promote public health and safety. However, other Islamic scholars or Ulamas, such as the Fatwa Council of the United Arab Emirates, the Fiqh Academy of the Organization of Islamic Cooperation in Saudi Arabia, and the Islamic Religious Council of Singapore, have declared the COVID-19 vaccines as completely halal under Sharia Law, stating that the vaccines are the only way to protect against COVID-19 infections and that the vaccines are still permitted to use even if haram ingredients were used in the formulation process.

=== Hinduism ===
Hinduism consists of various denominations that share core beliefs but differ in philosophies and practices. With no single founder, it is known as Sanatan Dharma (the Eternal Tradition) and traces its origins to the Vedic texts of ancient India, dating back to between 1500 BCE and 500 BCE.

In Hinduism, the ethical and symbolic meanings of scriptures, as interpreted by spiritually enlightened gurus, are often prioritized over literal interpretations. Vaccination is generally accepted in countries with a predominantly Hindu population.

Hindus uphold the principle of non-violence (ahimsa) and value all forms of life, believing that divinity exists in every being, including plants and animals.

Many Hindus follow a vegetarian diet to honor higher forms of life, while others consume meat only on specific days. Dietary practices differ across regions and communities. This review did not find any current concerns among Hindus regarding the presence of bovine-derived ingredients in some vaccines.

=== Buddhism ===
Buddhism is a religion with a variety of traditions, beliefs, and practices based on the teachings of Siddhartha Gautama, known as the Buddha, which means "the awakened one." The Buddha shared his insights to help people overcome ignorance, desire, and suffering, ultimately leading to Nirvana—a state of liberation from suffering. He taught in the eastern region of what is now India between the 6th and 4th centuries BCE, possibly around 563–483 BCE.

Buddhism includes several major branches, such as Theravada, Mahayana, Vajrayana, and Zen, but lacks a single central text or authority to define its doctrines or ethics. In predominantly Buddhist countries, vaccination is generally accepted.

Buddhism does not oppose using non-animal-derived medicines to treat illnesses, viewing treatment as an act of compassion. For example, while antibiotics destroy microorganisms, they are accepted because they help people stay healthy and maintain the harmony of body and mind, which supports progress toward Enlightenment. Preventing disease is seen as a way to preserve this harmony.

=== New religious movements and alternative beliefs ===
==== Congregation of Universal Wisdom ====
The Congregation of Universal Wisdom, an American religious movement based on belief in chiropractic spinal adjustments and Universal Intelligence, forbids vaccinations, surgerie, medicine, and any intrusive treatment as sacrilege. In 2015, its co-founder, chiropractor Walter P. Schilling said the group had 11,600 members worldwide. Schilling has described the movement as being about keeping the body pure and said that western medicine is paganism. In a court case citing the Congregation of Universal Wisdom, Turner v. Liverpool Cent. School, the United States District Court for the Northern District of New York affirmed the permissibility of claiming religious exemption from vaccination on the basis of such membership. The New York Times covered the Congregation of Universal Wisdom and noted that many families have used these religious memberships to avoid vaccination requirements and that joining only required writing a letter and paying $1; renouncing other religious is not required.

=== Ethical and moral concerns ===
==== Use of fetal tissue in vaccines ====
The use of fetal tissue in vaccine development has also provoked some controversy among religions opposed to abortion. The cell culture media of vaccines for varicella, rubella (in the MMR vaccine), hepatitis A, rabies (Imovax) and the Johnson & Johnson COVID-19 vaccine (no longer used in the U.S.) are produced using fetal cells to grow viruses. Since viruses require specific cells to reproduce, human cells are ideal for this purpose. Fetal cells, originally isolated from elective terminations in the 1960s, were chosen for their sterility, minimizing the risk of contamination. Fibroblast cells are used for all these vaccines except the J&J COVID-19 vaccine, which uses fetal retinal cells. Fetal cells obtained in the early 1960s have been continuously grown in laboratories and are still used for vaccine production today, with no need for additional sources. This method has led to moral controversy and considerations based on the principle of double effect by Thomas Aquinas. For example, the principle of double effect, originated by Thomas Aquinas, holds that actions with both good and bad consequences are morally acceptable in specific circumstances, and the question is how this principle applies to vaccination.

==== Catholic church's position ====
The Vatican Curia has expressed concern about the rubella vaccine's embryonic cell origin, saying Catholics have "... a grave responsibility to use alternative vaccines and to make a conscientious objection with regard to those which have moral problems". The Vatican concluded that until an alternative becomes available it is acceptable for Catholics to use the existing vaccine, writing, "This is an unjust alternative choice, which must be eliminated as soon as possible." The Catholic Church advises its members to choose vaccines that are developed without the use of human cell lines whenever feasible. Nonetheless, the Vatican has stated that "all vaccinations recognized as clinically safe and effective can be used in good conscience, with the certain knowledge that the use of such vaccines does not constitute formal cooperation with the abortion."

=== Political opposition to vaccination by religious groups ===
==== Opposition to vaccination among Jewish communities ====
Opposition to vaccination by Orthodox Jews is not a widespread phenomenon. The majority of Orthodox Rabbis view vaccination as a religious obligation. A magazine called P.E.A.C.H. that presented an anti-immunization message to Orthodox Jews was distributed in Brooklyn, New York in early 2014. 96% of students at Yeshivas (who are essentially all Orthodox Jewish) in New York City were immunized according to information obtained in 2014, although this is a lower than average rate.

==== Opposition to vaccination in Muslim communities ====
===== Nigeria =====
In 2003 imams in northern Nigeria advised their followers not to have their children vaccinated with oral polio vaccine, perceived to be a plot by Westerners to decrease Muslim fertility. The boycott caused the number of polio cases to rise not only in Nigeria but also in neighboring countries. The followers were also wary of other vaccinations, and Nigeria reported more than twenty thousand measles cases and nearly six hundred deaths from measles from January through March 2005. In 2006 Nigeria accounted for more than half of all new polio cases worldwide. Outbreaks continued thereafter; for example, at least 200 children died in a late-2007 measles outbreak in Borno State. In 2013, nine health workers administering polio vaccine were targeted and killed by gunmen on motorcycles in Kano, but this was an isolated incident. Local traditional and religious leaders and polio survivors worked to support the vaccination campaign, and Nigeria has not had a polio case since July 24, 2014; in 2016, Nigeria was declared polio-free.

===== Pakistan and Afghanistan =====
In the 2000s, in Pakistan and Afghanistan, some Taliban issued fatwas opposing vaccination as an American plot to sterilize Muslims, and kidnapped, beat, and assassinated vaccination officials; the head of Pakistan's vaccination campaign in Bajaur Agency was assassinated in 2007, on his way back from a meeting with a religious leader. In 2011, a CIA spy ran a fake hepatitis vaccination campaign to search for Osama bin Laden; such actions were strongly condemned by US and international health NGOs, the doctor involved was jailed and the CIA promised not to use vaccination as a cover again. A genuine polio vaccinator had previously vaccinated Osama bin Laden's children and grandchildren in his compound in Abbottabad. Both major sides of the Afghan civil war now support polio vaccination, and polio rates are declining rapidly in Afghanistan, with only five cases in January–July 2015. In Pakistan there were 28 cases in the same period.

===== Muslim Americans =====
In 2015, leaders of the Nation of Islam spoke out against a California Bill that removed philosophical exemptions to school vaccination requirements, alleging a link between MMR vaccine and autism. They also said that government mandated vaccines were another Tuskegee Syphilis Study.

==== Opposition to vaccination among Evangelical Christians ====
According to a March 2021 poll conducted by The Associated Press/NORC, vaccine skepticism is more widespread among white evangelicals than most other blocs of Americans. 40% of white evangelical Protestants stated they were not likely to get vaccinated against COVID-19.

== Impact of COVID-19 on religious perspectives and vaccination rates ==
The spread of COVID-19 has brought vaccine hesitancy into the global spotlight, but what influences the significant differences in vaccination rates across regions? Research spanning 195 regions worldwide suggests that religiosity (an institutionalized belief) and spirituality (more personal and intuition-based) play a key role in shaping vaccination trends.

In the first study, data from 23 global regions revealed a negative correlation between both spirituality and religiosity and COVID-19 vaccination rates. These findings remained consistent even after adjusting for vaccine supply limitations. The second study, which analyzed data from 144 regions, reinforced this trend—religiosity continued to be a strong negative predictor of vaccination rates, even when accounting for factors such as GDP, population age, collectivism, vaccine skepticism, and past vaccination history. The third study focused on all U.S. states and the District of Columbia, once again showing that higher levels of spirituality and religiosity were linked to lower vaccination rates, even after controlling for other variables. Overall, these studies highlight a strong relationship between spirituality, religiosity, and vaccine uptake, suggesting that regional differences in these factors may significantly influence real-world vaccination behaviors.

Additionally, in another study, Cross-National Comparison of Religion as a Predictor of COVID-19 Vaccination Rates, researchers explored the impact of religiosity on COVID-19 vaccination rates across nations while accounting for socio-economic and cultural factors. Analyzing data from 90 countries, covering 86% of the global population, they found a negative correlation between Christianity and vaccination rates, whereas no such relationship was observed for Islam, Buddhism, Hinduism, or non-belief. Factors such as the importance of religion, freedom of expression, sex ratio, median age, and most cultural variables showed no significant connection to vaccination rates, while the Human Development Index did. The study also highlighted how different religions influence vaccine uptake.

== Exemptions ==
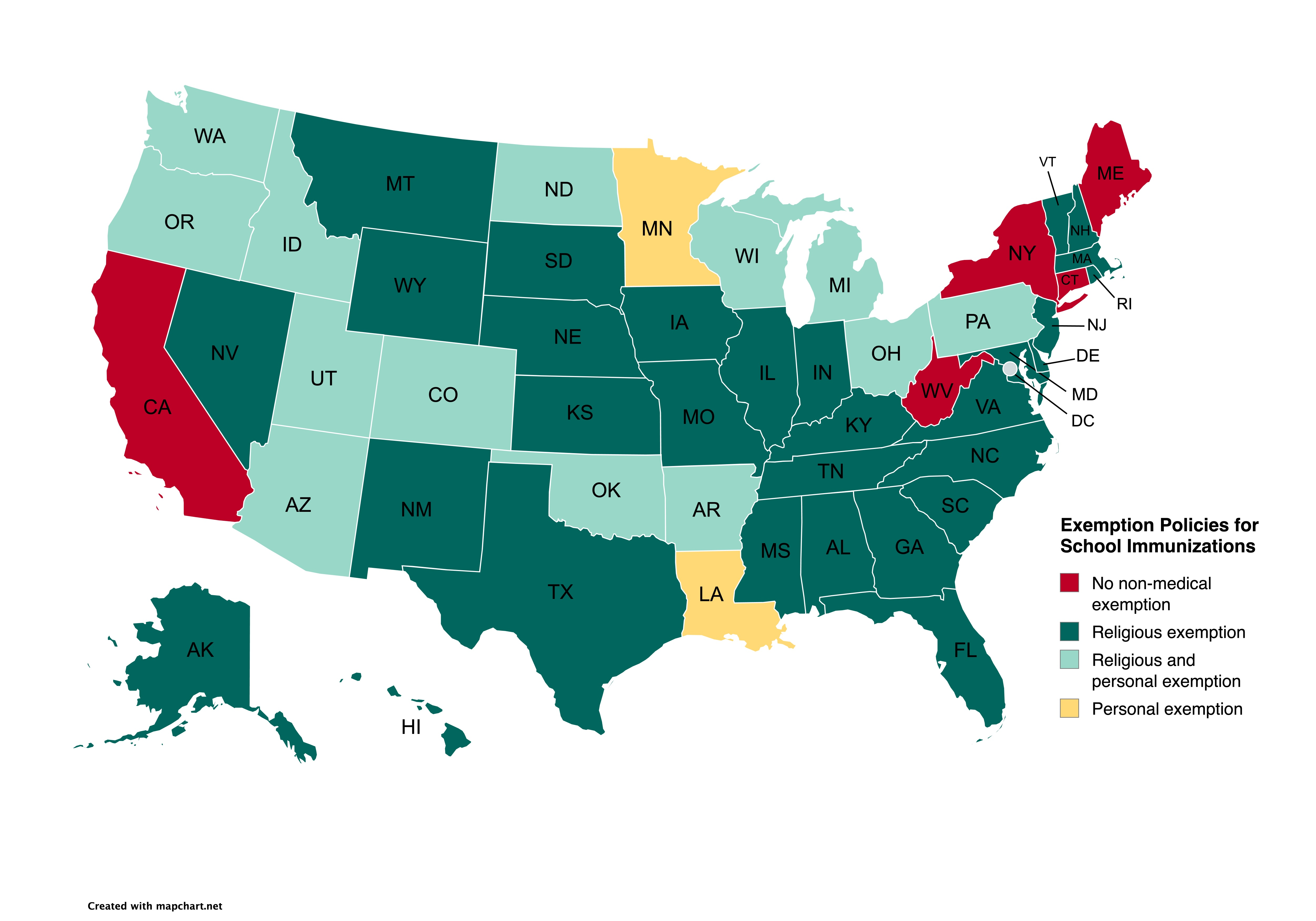
This image depicts a color-coded map of the United States based on the different exemption policies for school immunizations. The exemption categories include: religious exemptions, personal exemptions, religious and personal exemptions, or no non-medical exemptions.

In the U.S., all 50 states and Washington, D.C., require certain vaccines for students to attend school, aligning with recommendations from the CDC's Advisory Committee on Immunization Practices. While medical exemptions are permitted in every state, laws regarding non-medical exemptions for religious or personal reasons differ. Thirty states and D.C. permit religious exemptions, while thirteen allow either religious or personal exemptions. Louisiana and Minnesota do not specify whether non-medical exemptions must be religious or personal. Five states (Mississippi, California, West Virginia, Maine, and New York) are the only states that do not allow any non-medical exemptions, meaning all other states permit religious exemptions for parents who choose not to vaccinate their children for religious reasons.

The number of religious exemptions rose greatly in the late 1990s and early 2000s; for example, in Massachusetts, the rate of those seeking exemptions rose from 0.24% in 1996 to 0.60% in 2006. Some parents falsely claim religious beliefs to get exemptions. The American Medical Association opposes such exemptions, saying that they endanger health not only for the unvaccinated individual but also for neighbors and the community at large.

On January 1, 2016, Australia introduced legislation that removed eligibility for childcare and welfare benefits if parents refuse to vaccinate their children, removing religious exemptions at the same time as the only religion to apply for an exemption (Church of Christ, Scientist) deemed their exemption to no longer be relevant.

=== Recent measles outbreaks in religious communities ===
Mennonite Community in Texas: In early 2025, a significant measles outbreak occurred in Gaines County, Texas, primarily affecting an under-vaccinated Mennonite community. Despite the church not opposing vaccinations, some members' hesitancy contributed to the outbreak, leading to over 200 infections, hospitalizations, and two deaths.

Amish Community in New York: Concurrently, New York's Amish community faced legal challenges regarding religious exemptions to vaccination mandates. After the state's 2019 repeal of religious exemptions following a 2018 measles outbreak, the Amish contested this decision in Miller v. McDonald. In March 2025, the Second Circuit Court of Appeals upheld the repeal, emphasizing public health over religious exemptions. The U.S. Supreme Court later remanded the case for reconsideration in light of Mahmoud v. Taylor. In June 2026, the Second Circuit again upheld the law, concluding that Mahmoud did not change the outcome.

=== Legislative actions on religious exemptions ===
West Virginia's Legislative Decision: In March 2025, West Virginia's House of Delegates rejected a bill that would have introduced religious and philosophical exemptions to mandatory childhood vaccinations. This decision was influenced by concerns over public health, especially amid ongoing measles outbreaks in neighboring states.

=== Declining vaccination rates and public health concerns ===
Expert Warnings in Texas: Dr. Peter Hotez, co-director of the Center for Vaccine Development, highlighted the dangers of declining vaccination rates in Texas. He warned that reduced immunization could lead to the resurgence of diseases like measles, emphasizing the need for increased public awareness and vaccination efforts.
