= Church of Conscious Living =

Australian anti-vaccination organisation

The Church of Conscious Living is an Australian anti-vaccination organisation founded in 2015 to circumvent vaccination policy for childcare and play schemes.

The organisation was established by anti-vaccinationist Stephanie Messenger and promoted by the Australian Vaccination Network in order to exploit an exemption in the Australian "No Jab, No Play" policy for publicly supported childcare and play schemes. The policy only allows unvaccinated children to be enrolled in childcare if parents cite religious objections.

The Church of Conscious Living is not registered as a church or charity with the Australian federal government's Charities and Not-for-profits Commission; it is instead registered as a for-profit business. The Church costs $25 to join.

== Origin ==
A newsletter from the Australian Vaccination Network in December 2007 announced the creation of the church for the benefit of people who wish to refuse vaccination. It stated that "We have decided to create a 'religion', so, amongst other things, we can claim 'religious exemption', if the need ever arises, for ourselves and our children."

== Criticism ==
The NSW Government and the media have described the Church of Conscious Living as a "fake" or "sham" church, and mainstream churches have denounced it as the "cult of anti-vaccine".

Virologist David Hawkes described the group as a "devious sham", and investigation by the Telegraph found that no real church in Australia had any doctrinal objection to vaccination. It was denounced as "a scam" by NSW opposition health spokesman Andrew McDonald.

McDonald specifically identified the Church of Conscious Living, describing "spurious religious exemptions" as being open to abuse and exploitation in the legislation as then (May 2013) proposed, saying: "Today, sadly, we have already seen an attempt by the Australian Vaccination Network—it should be called the Australian anti-vaccination network—to exploit the loophole in these new vaccination laws by encouraging their supporters to join the Church of Conscious Living and avoid the New South Wales Government's vaccination legislation". Minister for Health Jillian Skinner noted that the "church" was promoted by the Australian Vaccination Network, and commented that recent changes to legislation permitted the Health Care Complaints Commission to scrutinise this activity.

Tony Abbott pledged, as federal opposition leader, to restrict religious exemptions to "clear religious reasons" and as Prime Minister in April 2015 he announced that family and childcare payments worth thousands of dollars per year would be stripped from vaccine refusers unless supported by a religious exemption formally approved by the Government.
