= Melanie's Marvelous Measles =

Anti-vaccine book with dangerous message that contracting the measles is beneficial

- Author: Stephanie Messenger
- Language: English
- Subject: Measles, anti-vaccination
- Genre: Children's book
- Published: 2012
- Publisher: self-published
- Publication place: Australia
- ISBN: 9780987233400

Melanie's Marvelous Measles is a self-published children's book written by Australian author and anti-vaccine activist Stephanie Messenger. Through its story, the book claims, contrary to scientific data, that contracting measles is beneficial to health, and that vaccines are ineffective.

The book was first published in 2012, but came to attention in 2015 following a measles outbreak that began at Disneyland during December of the previous year. Many commentators have criticised the book because of the dangers associated with contracting measles, and because its title is reminiscent of George's Marvellous Medicine, by Roald Dahl, who was a prominent advocate of vaccination in his later years, following the death of his daughter Olivia from measles in 1962. The book has also received attention for the numerous negative, often sarcastic, reviews it has received on Amazon.com.

== Premise and plot ==
The book contends that contracting measles is beneficial for children, with the book's product description describing the disease as "quite benign" and "beneficial to the body".

Melanie's Marvelous Measles was written to educate children on the benefits of having measles and how you can heal from them naturally and successfully. Often today, we are being bombarded with messages from vested interests to fear all diseases in order for someone to sell some potion or vaccine, when, in fact, history shows that in industrialised countries, these diseases are quite benign and, according to natural health sources, beneficial to the body.

— Blurb in back of book

In the story, a girl named Tina, who has never been vaccinated, returns to school after the winter break and discovers that her friend Melanie is at home with measles. Tina's mother encourages Tina to visit Melanie, because catching measles would be a good thing for Tina. Tina tells her mother that the other children are frightened of getting measles, but her mother reassures her by explaining that catching measles is a good thing for most children: "Many wise people believe measles make the body stronger and more mature for the future". She suggests some carrot juice and melon might help Melanie recover. She says that being scared of the disease is "a bit like being scared of the dark". Her mother explains that Tina has not been vaccinated because her older brother got sick after receiving his vaccinations. Melanie's mother explains that Melanie had been vaccinated against measles and it did not work; the doctor said that Melanie's measles were the worst case he had ever seen. Melanie explains to Tina that the spots do not hurt or itch, and shows Tina her spotty tummy. The two girls spend the day playing together and end the day with a hug. A week later Tina is back to school, without measles. Her mother attributes this to her eating the right foods, playing in the fresh air and drinking much water. Jared, a vaccinated boy, ends up being the one that gets measles; Tina's mother blames this on his bad eating habits and "the accompanying image is of an annoyed Jared laying in bed covered in spots with a hamburger, chips (labeled 'MSG-enriched, GM-full'), ... soda, cupcake, chocolate bar on his bedside table".

The book also criticizes childhood vaccines as ineffective, and Messenger states in the book that she has raised three children "vaccine-free and childhood disease-free".

== Reception ==
Although the book was first published in 2012, it received considerable attention after the Disneyland measles outbreak began in December 2014, which led to many people looking for the book in order to criticise it.

The book has been criticised because measles is responsible for thousands of deaths every year.

Most reviews have been negative: for example, the president of the Australian Medical Association, Steve Hambleton, said: "Last time I saw a kid with measles with the rash they were carried into the surgery and the child looked like a rag doll. The mother was terrified. It's still fatal. About one in 10,000 children will die because of encephalitis". "Even in 'industrialised countries', measles can cause encephalitis, seizures, blindness, heart and nervous system disorders, and (rarely) death". Dr. David Gorski, a breast cancer surgeon who writes frequently against alternative medicine and the anti-vaccine movement, writes: "I'm sure children with whooping cough who are coughing so hard that they can't catch their breath for hours on end, with haemophilus influenzae type B who develop pneumonia or meningitis, with polio who develop paralysis, or with measles who develop pneumonia or subacute sclerosing panencephalitis will feel happy to 'embrace childhood disease', at least those who don't end up dead, who can't embrace anything other than the grave." William Sears says: "Complications of the disease include pneumonia and encephalitis, swelling of the brain, that can result in deafness or mental retardation. I've seen a case of measles encephalitis and it's not pretty. There's nothing awesome about it at all".

Quite a few of the reviews contain statistics of illnesses in recent years. Sears states that it is very easy to catch measles: "Before the vaccine that eradicated the disease from this country by 2000, 'hundreds of thousands of kids got measles every year'... The CDC claims that, if exposed, 90% of unvaccinated people who come in contact with an infected person will get the disease. 'And for 1 out of every 1,000 children who contract it, the disease is fatal.'" "The World Health Organization says measles is 'one of the leading causes of death among young children even though a safe and cost-effective vaccine is available'. There are about 140,000 deaths a year, mostly in poor countries. In Australia measles deaths are now rare because the disease has been controlled though widespread vaccination. When it does occur, the danger comes from complications such as pneumonia and encephalitis. Dr. Hambleton said while "there were occasional adverse reactions to the vaccination, it was far more dangerous to actually experience the disease." In Pakistan, the World Health Organization reported 64 deaths from measles in 2011 and 306 deaths in 2012. "Many Pakistanis", reported Al Jazeera, "especially in rural areas, view vaccination campaigns with suspicion as a western plot to sterilize Muslims."

David Gorski states that this clearly is an anti-vaccine book aimed at children who are told to "embrace childhood disease", eat healthy, and get plenty of sleep and sunshine. He feels that the anti-vaccine parents are hiding their children in the herd of vaccinated children and that if these parents had experienced polio and smallpox like "our grandparents had", they would not be so eager to refute vaccinations now. He thinks that Messenger's belief that her first child's death (from an unreported cause) was vaccine related, and that her three younger children are healthy because they are not vaccinated, is just confirmation bias, and that statements from Messenger like, "My unvaccinated children are alive and well and my vaccinated child is dead! That's what I know and live with every day" are difficult to combat with numbers, but it is still important to keep trying.

Gorski continues: "The death of a single child, whatever the cause, is a tragedy. If we want to see a lot more of these tragedies, all we have to do is to be complacent and let the vaccination rate fall too far below herd enormity. [sic]"

Messenger has said she was trying to give parents and children more knowledge. "Only people who are not in favour of a free press or free speech would [want it banned]", she said. "Natural health says that measles is a good thing for a reasonably healthy child to have". The Australian Vaccination-Skeptics Network (AVN) stated on their webpage that Messenger was "concerned that the public are being misled by medical professionals. They are trying to say that vaccination is safe and effective and it is neither one of those things".

The AVN praises the book for its "beautiful" illustrations, and "simple, colourful text". It discusses not only the fact that measles is usually benign in healthy, well-nourished children, but the importance of proper nutrition including vitamin A from orange fruits and vegetables".

=== Roald Dahl book ===
Another reason for the criticism is because the book's title resembles that of the book George's Marvellous Medicine, by Roald Dahl, who was a strong proponent of vaccination. Dahl's daughter, Olivia, died from measles in 1962 and he later wrote an account of her death.

One reviewer commented that "I can only assume the author Stephanie Messenger was unaware of the incredibly offensive nature of the title".

=== Amazon reviews ===
The book has received numerous negative reviews on Amazon.com; as of February 2015, the book had over 1,000 one-star ratings on this website. Melanie's Marvelous Measles was written in 2012, but because of measles outbreaks across America in 2015, attention has been refocused on combating the anti-vaccine message. "So, the Internet is doing what the Internet does best: trolling the hell out of Messenger's deeply flawed book through Amazon comments". Amazon has chosen to use a disclaimer on the book description, "noting that it is 'provided by the publisher/author of this title and presents the subjective opinions of the publisher/author, which may not be substantiated'". By January 2013, Yahoo! reported that "of the 83 reviews of the book, 71 Amazon users gave it one star, and posted negative feedback." "The Amazon reader reviews are reassuringly vicious, pointing out that a similar book about 'Peter's Pleasant Polio' probably wouldn't get published".

"Certainly, reviewers of the book on the Amazon website don't agree with Messenger's interpretation of history. Many people have left comments on the website, telling their own stories of spending time in hospitals as a child in an oxygen tent, and of siblings who died from complications arising from measles".

The reviews are mostly either one-star or five-star; in an act of unity, most of the five-starred reviews are parodies of the title, or over-the-top cynical commentaries on the book's anti-vaccination message. News.com.au describes the Amazon comments as people mocking the book. In January 2015, Melanie's Marvelous Measles is continuing to receive harsh reviews on Amazon, "(where the story rates 1.9 stars out of 5), with commenters (sic) calling its message 'ignorant and dangerous'. One pediatric nurse wrote that the book was 'appalling'; another said it was 'new-age propaganda'. One (sarcastic) reviewer even rated the book five stars and wrote 'It made me realize things like Ebola should be embraced'".

=== Book withdrawn from sale from Australian bookstore ===
Although it was originally available in Australia through Messenger's website, the book was promoted in Australian bookstores by a US publisher. Steve Hambleton, President of the Australian Medical Association, stated that publishers "should be ashamed of themselves" and asked that the book be pulled from sale. Bookworld (formerly Borders) CEO James Webber stated that "it was a 'sensitive issue' but their policy was to allow controversial content unless it was actually illegal". "This is one of tens of millions of titles that we list on the site, however [it] is not the type of book that we would ever consider actively promoting in any way", he said.

Eventually, due to pressure from customers, Bookworld decided to pull Melanie's Marvelous Measles. A spokesman told News.com.au: "In this case we listened to our customers and believe they have a fair argument and have removed the titles from both pages".

== See also ==
- Vaccine controversies
- MMR vaccine controversy
- Measles resurgence in the United States
