= Nicola Spurrier =

Australian paediatrician and public health administrator (born 1966)

Nicola Spurrier PSM
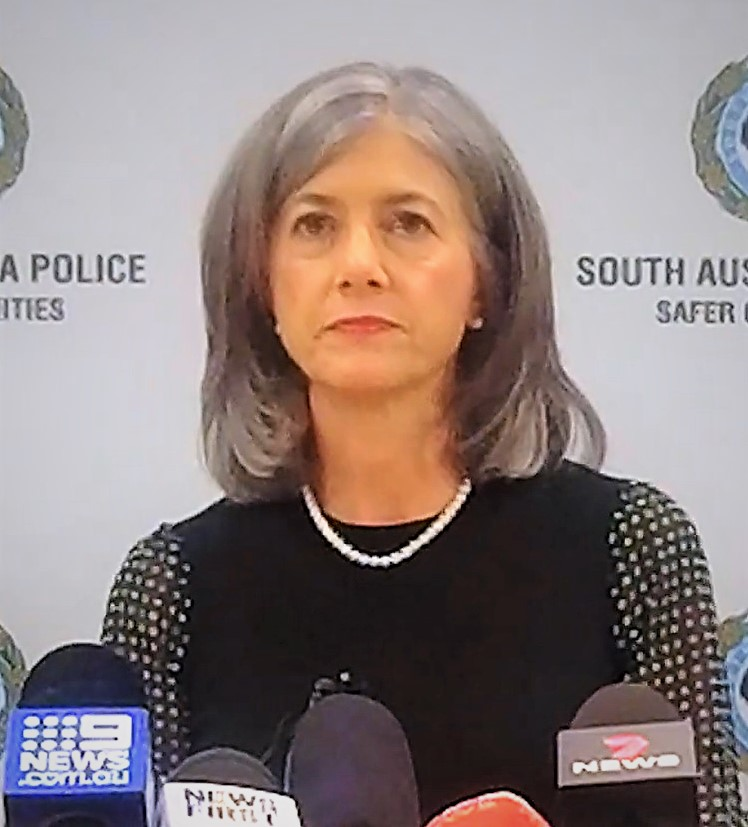
- Spurrier speaks on South Australia Police News in 2021
- Born: Nicola Jane Smith
- Education: University of Adelaide
- Occupations: paediatrician and public health physician
- Spouse: David Spurrier (m. 1990)
- Children: 3
- Awards: Public Service Medal June 2021

Chief Public Health Officer for South Australia
- Incumbent
- Assumed office August 2019
- Preceded by: Paddy Phillips

Nicola Jane Spurrier is an Australian paediatrician and public health physician who has been the Chief Public Health Officer of the state of South Australia since August 2019.

== Education ==
Nicola Jane Spurrier graduated with a Bachelor of Medicine, Bachelor of Surgery from the University of Adelaide in 1990.

She has a graduate diploma in epidemiology from the University of Newcastle, New South Wales (1997), and completed a PhD from the University of Adelaide in 1999, with a thesis titled "Parental management of children's asthma:the role of psychosocial factors".

== Career ==
Spurrier is qualified as a specialist in both public health and paediatrics.

She worked at the Women's and Children's Hospital in Adelaide from 1993 until June 1998, when she was appointed lecturer in paediatrics and child health at Flinders University and consultant paediatrician at Flinders Medical Centre. She was employed by Flinders until March 2010. In March 2011, the university awarded her the status of associate professor with the College of Medicine and Public Health. In April 2020, she was appointed professor.

Spurrier has worked for SA Health since 2019, developing and implementing programs and policies focused on child health, obesity prevention and Aboriginal health.

She became Chief Public Health Officer for South Australia in August 2019. Four months later, she was involved in the state's response to bushfires. From March 2020, Spurrier led South Australia's response to the COVID-19 pandemic, giving daily press conferences alongside Premier Steven Marshall, in which she was called "calm, honest and direct". She became popular with the public and had a cocktail named after her at Adelaide bar 2KW. Despite her "cult following", she ruled out a move into politics.

In August 2025 Spurrier was reappointed Chief Public Health Officer for a term of three years.

In September 2026 she was in the media again to report on a measles outbreak that had occurred at Brighton Secondary School in the southern seaside suburb of Adelaide, North Brighton.

== Awards and recognition ==
Spurrier is a Fellow of the Royal Australasian College of Physicians and the Australasian Faculty of Public Health Medicine.

She was one of four nominees for 2021 South Australian of the Year.

Spurrier was awarded a Public Service Medal (PSM) in the 2021 Queen's Birthday Honours for outstanding public service to community health in South Australia.

In September 2022, a newly discovered species of bacteria was named Nicolia spurrieriana in recognition of Spurrier's work during the COVID-19 pandemic.

== Personal life ==
Spurrier married David Spurrier, a physiotherapist, around 1990. They have a daughter and two sons. Her mother, sister, and brother-in-law are all also doctors.

On 9 March 2025 she undertook the Sid James Victor Harbor Triathlon in fundraising and awareness event for arts in healthcare, organised by the Hospital Research Foundation Group to provide programs for Flinders Medical Centre patients.

On 25 October 2025 she was knocked off her bicycle by a car when the driver did not give way to her at a roundabout, which caused multiple bone fractures and an injured shoulder that needed two operations to fix. Her injuries took seven months to heal. She shared her experience with media in September 2026, to promote road safety during National Road Safety Week.

== Selected publications ==
=== Book ===
- Kirke, Kerry; Spurrier, Nicola; Bray, Martin (2009). Screening For Good Health: The Australian Guide To Health Screening And Immunisation. Melbourne University Publishing. ISBN 9780522859331.

=== Articles ===
- Nicola J Spurrier; Michael G Sawyer; Jennifer J Clark; Peter Baghurst (2003). "Socio-economic differentials in the health-related quality of life of Australian children: results of a national study". Australian and New Zealand Journal of Public Health. 27 (1): 27–33. doi:10.1111/j.1467-842x.2003.tb00376.x. PMID 14705264. Wikidata Q53359918.
- Nicola J Spurrier; Michael G Sawyer; David L Streiner; A James Martin; Declan Kennedy (2005). "New measure of parental asthma management for school-age children". Pediatric Pulmonology. 40 (3): 241–250. doi:10.1002/ppul.20261. PMID 16013068. Wikidata Q53618590.
- Nicola J Spurrier; Magarey, Anthea; Catherine Wong (2006). "Recognition and management of childhood overweight and obesity by clinicians". Journal of Paediatrics and Child Health. 42 (7–8): 411–418. doi:10.1111/j.1440-1754.2006.00890.x. PMID 16898877. Wikidata Q53591063.
- Nicola J Spurrier; Magarey, Anthea; Rebecca Golley; Fiona Curnow; Michael G Sawyer (2008). "Relationships between the home environment and physical activity and dietary patterns of preschool children: a cross-sectional study". International Journal of Behavioral Nutrition and Physical Activity. 5: 31. doi:10.1186/1479-5868-5-31. PMC 2432071. PMID 18513416. Wikidata Q36728811.
- Nicola J Spurrier; Robert E Volkmer; Christina Abi Abdallah; Alwin Chong (2012). "South Australian four-year-old Aboriginal children: residence and socioeconomic status influence weight". Australian and New Zealand Journal of Public Health. 36 (3): 285–290. doi:10.1111/j.1753-6405.2012.00872.x. PMID 22672037. Wikidata Q40039558.
- Allison Larg; John R Moss; Nicola Spurrier (2018). "Relative contribution of overweight and obesity to rising public hospital in-patient expenditure in South Australia". Australian Health Review. doi:10.1071/ah17147. PMID 29467071. Wikidata Q51368355.
- Patrick C K Tam; Kathleen M Ly; Max L Kernich; Nicola Spurrier; Diana Lawrence; David L Gordon; Emily C Tucker (2020). "Detectable severe acute respiratory syndrome coronavirus 2 (SARS-CoV-2) in human breast milk of a mildly symptomatic patient with coronavirus disease 2019 (COVID-19)". Clinical Infectious Diseases. doi:10.1093/cid/ciaa673. PMC 7314245. PMID 32472683. Wikidata Q96025027.
