= Stephanie Messenger =

Australian anti-vaccine activist

- Known for: Anti-Vaccine activist
- Website: http://naturematters.info/

Stephanie Frances Bailey (born 26 July 1970), more commonly known by the Australian Registered Business Name Stephanie Messenger, is an anti-vaccination activist, lecturer and author from Brisbane, Australia who believes her son was killed by vaccination. She writes children's books focusing on health and social issues, her most noteworthy being Melanie's Marvelous Measles which was published in 2012 but received considerable media attention after the Disneyland measles outbreak in 2014. Messenger organised a 2015 lecture tour of Australia for fellow anti-vaccinationist Sherri Tenpenny. The tour was cancelled due to public outcry over the anti-vaccination stance of the tour.

== Child's death ==
Messenger's son died soon after his first birthday, she says about his death, "Vaccination killed him, I have no doubt. If he crawled under the sink and drank the same poisonous concoction of heavy metals, formaldehyde, foreign proteins, multiple viruses and a host of other toxins, the emergency room would have called it poisoning. Because it was injected into his body, it's called 'a coincidence'!"

The Herald Sun says that Messenger's statements are not based on science and she never offers proof of her statements or names of doctors that support her. Messenger states that her three remaining children are unvaccinated and are very healthy, she says sunshine and healthy food will protect them, while the Herald Sun says "She also argues that her unvaccinated children have never had any serious illnesses. I wonder if she realises this is because vaccination programs (of which she refuses to be a part) have eradicated many diseases that claimed so many lives in the past. Her children are also benefiting from the sensible precautions taken by the rest of us."

== Melanie's Marvelous Measles ==
Melanie's Marvelous Measles is a self-published children's book written in 2012. The book argues that contracting measles is beneficial to health and that vaccines are ineffective. The book came to attention in 2015 after the Disneyland measles outbreak began during December of the previous year. Many commentators have criticised the book because of the dangers associated with contracting measles, and because its title is reminiscent of George's Marvellous Medicine, by Roald Dahl, whose daughter, Olivia Dahl, died from measles, leading Dahl to become a vociferous campaigner for immunisation. The book has also received attention for the numerous negative reviews it has received on Amazon.com. The Herald Sun stated that Messenger's book is very dangerous and should be "avoided like the plague".

== Failed tour by Tenpenny ==
In 2014, Messenger organised a lecture tour in Australia for American physician and anti-vaccine activist Sherri Tenpenny called 'Healthy Lifestyles Naturally'. Shortly after this announcement, outcry from the public and the scientific communities managed to alert the media and pressure the venues to cancel her lectures. The Australian immigration minister Peter Dutton was petitioned to revoke her visa. Reports appeared that he was considering doing so.

Stop the AVN spokesperson Peter Tierney stated that the venues were misled into thinking the lecture series was about child health and SIDS awareness. The seminar bookings page listed the "Get Rid of SIDS Project Inc" and the GanKinMan Foundation as sponsors. "There is no listing for the GanKinMan Foundation on the websites of the Australian Securities and Investments Commission, the Australian Charities and Not-for-Profits Commission or the Australian Business Register." The SIDS charity is registered to Messenger's husband, Leslie Bailey. Messenger stated that cancelling the lectures would set a bad precedent as people need to be informed and have all sides presented in order to make good parenting decisions. She said that visas should not be cancelled for someone who has done nothing wrong. "All of Dr Tenpenny's information is referenced by medical and scientific papers ... so I don't know what they're trying to stop the people from seeing."

In January 2015, the Kareela Golf and Social Club in Sydney, Australia cancelled a talk that Tenpenny had been scheduled to give there. A spokesperson for the club said that the subject matter Tenpenny was going to discuss was "too controversial for us to be involved in." Several other Australian venues followed suit soon afterward, which led Meryl Dorey of anti-vaccination lobby group the Australian Vaccination-Skeptics Network to compare opponents of Tenpenny's visits to Australia to the perpetrators of the Charlie Hebdo shooting. By January 19, all eight venues at which Tenpenny was originally scheduled to speak had cancelled her seminars. Virologist David Hawkes responds to the cancellation of the lecture series by saying it "was a win for people who were concerned about public health...." "It has been driven by parents generally at a community level who were concerned about the emergence of diseases like whooping cough in the last few years due to less than ideal vaccination rates." In an email to her supporters in April 2015, Messenger asks, "If everyone just purchased one of my books, imagine how quickly I can be out of debt for the cancelled Dr Sherri Tenpenny tour."

Skeptic Zone reporter, Jo Alabaster stated that she has received a full refund for the lecture she was to attend. In an appearance on The Project on 6 January 2015, Rachael Dunlop said, "Of course parents have the right to be concerned about a medical procedure, but overwhelmingly they need access to accurate, science-based information – and this is not what they will get from Doctor Tenpenny."

== Flier campaign ==
In December 2017, Messenger, in a post to her followers, encouraged them to distribute a pamphlet titled "Vaccines Killed My Baby" which details the story of her child's death. Messenger says the purpose of this pamphlet is not to "preac[h] to the converted" and provide more information on "autism, vaccine pregnancy, HPV, baby vax ingredients and side effects, flu vax, corruption in science and media, reliable websites to go to, etc." so that "we educate our kids before the government does it for you". In this post, Messenger said she had 160 people ready to put 1000 fliers in letterboxes in their area. She plans on distributing a total of 500,000 fliers total.

According to Heidi Robinson with the Northern Rivers Vaccination Supporters, fliers were found in suburbs of Brisbane, the Sunshine Coast, Canberra, the Northern Territory, and the Northern Rivers.

== Other activities ==
One of the sponsors of the failed Tenpenny Australian 2015 tour was a project run by Messenger, Get Rid of Sids which claimed to educate parents about preventing Sudden infant death syndrome. Get Rid of Sids "promotes a theory that toxic gas emitted from mattress covers is responsible for babies dying from SIDS. This is based on a 1975 study from Japan. This study has been replicated hundreds of times and actually shows that "vaccinated children have a lower rate of SIDS." In 2010, it received charitable status which was revoked on 1 April 2015 by the Australian Charities and Not-for-profits Commission (ACNC). The ACNC was unable to comment due to privacy reasons but they issued the statement that it "had been revoked 'following a review into the organisation's operations and activities'." According to the ACNC's 2013 website, Get Rid of Sids project had no income and no employees in 2013. "The National Sids Council of Australia has said that 'rigorously conducted, scientifically based research has concluded that there is no evidence to support the link between wrapping mattresses and the prevention of Sids.'"

== Selected works ==
- Sarah Visits a Naturopath – (self-published)
- Vegetarian Muscles – (self-published)
- Don't Bully Billy (self-published)
- Goodbye Grandma (self-published)
