= Measles in Australia =

Incidence of measles in Australia and government campaign to eradicate it

Cases of measles were sharply reduced by the Australian Measles Control Campaign, an Australian Government public health campaign to eliminate the infectious disease measles. It was initiated in 1998 by the Department of Health and Aged Care as part of the World Health Organization's global measles eradication program, and in response to major epidemics in Australia throughout 1994/95, together with a report predicting another impending measles epidemic in Australia.

Endemic measles was declared eradicated from Australia in February 2009, and has maintained that status; however, there is concern about numbers of vaccinated infants slipping in some sectors of the population. After experiencing zero cases in 2021, numbers had risen by to 181 in 2025. Most of the cases recorded in 2026 so far have been from under-vaccinated people who were infected overseas, with some limited local transmission to under-vaccinated contacts. As of September 2026 there is an ongoing outbreak of measles at a high school in Adelaide.

== Background ==
Australia introduced measles vaccination in 1968, with a single dose for children aged 12-23 months. In 1993 a second dose was added to the schedule, first for those aged 10-14 years, later dropping the age of the second does to 4-5.

Following the World Health Organization's adoption of a 2010 target date for Global Measles eradication and the notation that a single dose vaccination strategy was ineffective, the federal Health Department (then named the Department of Health and Aged Care) began investigating the options for a measles elimination campaign in Australia. In 1996 and 1997, serosurveys were conducted in South Australia and New South Wales to assess the current levels of measles immunity. Results indicated that there were "probably enough susceptible children in the South Australian population to support a measles epidemic".

== Australian Measles Control Campaign ==
In November 1997, a workshop of experts was formed to discuss the logistical, funding and surveillance issues of a potential measles elimination campaign. The group concluded that the second dose of MMR should be brought forward from 12 years to 4 years (in line with WHO recommendations), and that a school-based campaign be implemented. Three groups would be targeted for vaccination:

- Primary School children (5–12 yrs): This group would be offered vaccination at school-based clinics, to be provided by two Registered Nurses per school.
- Pre-school children (1–4 yrs): Letters would be sent to the parents of all children who were overdue for their first dose of MMR, encouraging them to attend their GP for vaccination.
- High-School children (12–18 yrs): A letter would be sent to all parents encouraging them to ensure their children had received two doses of MMR.

The Australian Measles Control Campaign was initiated in August 1998. It was promoted using the slogan "Let's Work Together to Beat Measles".

=== Objectives ===
- Cease measles-related morbidity and mortality, by interrupting indigenous transmission of measles
- Prevent reintroduction of measles until global eradication is achieved, by maintaining uniformly low levels of population susceptibility

=== Statistics ===
The campaign vaccinated 1.78 million children, making it the largest national vaccination campaign conducted in Australia since the introduction of poliomyelitis vaccination in 1956.

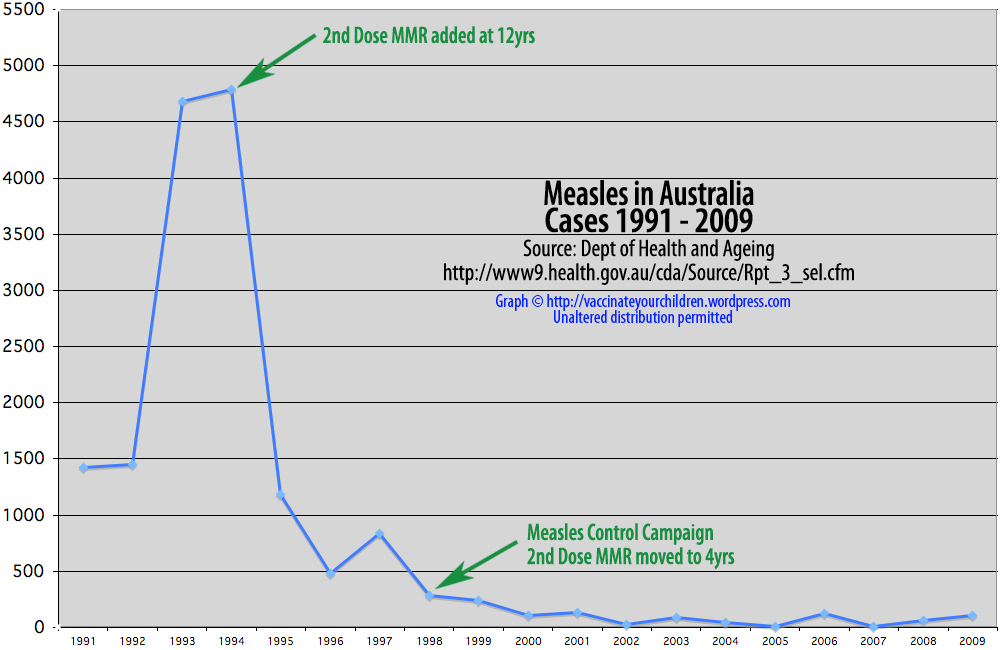
Measles morbidity in Australia, 1991–2009

- 1.7 million primary-school aged children vaccinated, representing 96% of children in this age group
- 800,000 pre-school children vaccinated
- 89 total adverse events (33% of which were fainting) representing 5.24 total adverse events per 100,000 doses
- Prevented an estimated 17,500 cases of measles
- Prevented an estimated 8 measles-related fatalities
- Total cost of the campaign was A$30,841,356

=== Results ===
- Increase in measles immunity for 1–18 year-olds from 85% to 90%, and 6–12 year-olds (the target age group) from 84% to 96% (Assessed by serosurvey).
- Increase in Rubella immunity in 1–18 year-olds from 83% to 91% (assessed by serosurvey).
- 96% fall in reported measles cases after five years, from 836 in 1997 to 32 in 2001.
- Endemic measles declared eradicated from Australia in February 2009

== Eradication and ongoing status ==
Endemic measles was declared eradicated from Australia in February 2009, and Australia has maintained its World Health Organization (WHO)-certified measles elimination status since 2014. The lead author of a paper in Vaccine journal, James Wood of UNSW, said that this did not mean there would be no more measles cases in the country, but that large outbreaks had been eliminated. It was still expected that there would be around 100 cases a year due to cases brought in from overseas. Around this time, the government schedule changed the second dose of MMR vaccine from the age of four years to 18 months, with the aim of increasing uptake. This continues to the present (2026), as recommended by the Australian Centre for Disease Control; the first dose remains at 12 months.

Measles remains a notifiable disease, which is required to be reported to the National Notifiable Diseases Surveillance System. The NNDSS portal shows statistics on measles since 1991, showing that the high of 4,794 cases in 1994 dropped to 10 by 2005. It has varied since then, reducing to zero during the COVID-19 pandemic in Australia in 2021, but rising to 181 in 2025.

In August 2026, the National Centre for Immunisation Research and Surveillance raised concerns that the population was becoming vulnerable to outbreaks, after a study that looked at 2019 statistics estimated 1.7 million Australians, or 6.7% of the population, did not have sufficient immunity in that year. The percentage of vaccinated individuals in Australia is within the WHO target range of 93–95% for herd immunity, but it is near the bottom of the range, and immunity is not distributed evenly across the population. The authors said that the most vulnerable group were babies who were too young to receive their full measles vaccination schedule, and Australians born from the late 1970s onwards, particularly those born between 1977 and 1983, who would have had only a single dose of the vaccine. The BMJ reported that "Australia's hard fought herd immunity to measles [was] under threat".

Experts are concerned about the possibility of measles, along with other diseases previously eradicated from Australia, such as diphtheria, returning to the population owing to factors such as decreasing rates of vaccination owing to misinformation spread since the COVID-19 pandemic, and the combination of busyness and complacency among parents. By October 2026, both Canada and the UK had lost their measles-free status, with the US likely to follow soon.

== Recent outbreaks ==
Officials have been on the alert in 2026 following deadly outbreaks in South and Southeast Asia. A CDC spokesperson said that most of the cases recorded in 2026 so far were from under-vaccinated people who were infected overseas, with some limited local transmission to under-vaccinated contacts. Cases had risen to 181 cases in 2025, from just 57 in 2024.

On 24 September 2026, a measles outbreak in Adelaide, South Australia, was announced by SA Health, after three schoolgirls at Brighton Secondary School had contracted the disease. Following 2025, a year in which a total of 7 cases had been notified in the state, this brought to 8 the number notified in 2026. SA funds measles vaccine for adults born during or after 1966 who have not received two doses, and children aged 6 to 12 months who are about to travel overseas. The local council had set up a vaccination clinic for members of the school community. A fourth teenager was later diagnosed with the disease. The 14 September case originated in the Maldives, with the infectious person being on a plane to Adelaide via Singapore. A fifth case, a teacher who attended a school event at Adelaide Entertainment Centre, was reported on 28 September, bringing the total number in 2026 to 9. The chief health officer, Nicola Spurrier, said that she was more concerned about one of the cases who had been at the Queen Elizabeth Hospital while infectious, because of exposure to vulnerable patients at the site.
