= Australian Vaccination-risks Network =

Anti-vaccination propaganda group

- Abbreviation: AVN
- Formation: 1994
- Founder: Meryl Dorey
- Type: Pressure group
- Registration no.: Y2079127-(NSW) and ABN-30077002923
- Purpose: Anti-vaccination campaigning
- Headquarters: Bangalow, New South Wales, Australia
- Members: 234 (2014)
- President: Aneeta Hafemeister (as at November 2019)
- Head spokesperson: Meryl Dorey
- Beliefs: Conspiracies in vaccine science/policy
- Board of directors: (not disclosed)
- Key people: Tasha David, Brett Smith, Greg Beattie (former president), Meryl Dorey, Judy Wilyman, Annastasha David
- Website: AVN.org.au
- Formerly called: Australian Vaccination Network (AVN) 1994–2014, Australian Vaccination-Skeptics Network (AVsN) 2014–2018

The Australian Vaccination-risks Network Inc., formerly known as the Australian Vaccination-Skeptics Network (AVsN), and before that known as the Australian Vaccination Network (AVN), is an Australian anti-vaccination pressure group registered in New South Wales. As Australia's most controversial anti-vaccination organisation, it has lobbied against a variety of vaccination-related programs, downplayed the danger of childhood diseases such as measles and pertussis, championed the cause of alleged vaccination victims, and promoted the use of ineffective alternatives such as homeopathy.

Opposition to vaccination is a fringe medical science viewpoint. The group has been described by the New South Wales Health Care Complaints Commission (HCCC) as a provider of "misleading and inaccurate" vaccination information, and has been heavily criticised by doctors and other experts on immunisation. The group has been called the "stronghold of the anti-vaccination movement" in Australia and is subject to widespread criticism from medical professionals, scientists and other proponents of vaccination. It has also been criticised for harassing the parents of a victim of vaccine-preventable disease, and for promoting the false idea that shaken baby syndrome is actually vaccine injury.

On 14 October 2010, the organisation's right to raise funds was stripped from it by the New South Wales Office of Liquor, Gaming and Racing, stating that its appeals had "not been conducted in good faith for charitable purposes". In December 2012, the New South Wales Office of Fair Trading issued an order for the group to change its name within two months or be de-registered. The department described the group's name as being "misleading and a detriment to the community". The group changed its name in February 2014. In July 2018 the group changed its name to Australian Vaccination-risks Network Inc. citing that many in their group "did not feel comfortable with having the word 'skeptics' in" their name as the reason for the change. The group decided that the word "skeptic" too closely aligned them with Scientific Skepticism organisations such as the Australian Skeptics.

== Organisation ==
The Australian Vaccination-Skeptics Network was formed in 1994 as the Vaccination Awareness Network by Meryl Dorey, a medically unqualified American who moved to Australia with her Australian husband, saying she got involved after her eldest son was allegedly adversely affected by DPT and MMR vaccines administered when he was a child. The group applied for tax-deductible charity status through the Australian Taxation Office and finally obtained it in 2002; it lost that status in 2007 by allowing it to lapse, and obtained it again in 2009. In 2010 the group's tax-exempt status was revoked by the NSW Office of Liquor, Gaming and Racing after an audit of the organisation finding that AVN fundraising appeals had not been conducted in good faith for charitable purposes, had been improperly administered and were not in the public interest.

In July 2009, the AVN claimed it had more than 3500 members; however, in a constitutional change voting proxy form published in March 2010, the AVN revealed the actual membership is considerably lower, at around 1867 financial members. The AVN is headquartered in Bangalow, New South Wales.

In February 2010 Dorey announced that she was resigning, but held the position of President until 1 January 2013, when she was replaced by Greg Beattie. Dorey remains with the AVN as "Public Officer and spokesperson".

In addition to its website and associated blog AVN published a quarterly magazine called Informed Voice, later renamed Living Wisdom and offered as a digital publication. Living Wisdom ceased publication in January 2013. The AVN's paid-for memberships formerly included a quarterly insert called Inside Edition which contained "12 pages of current news from around the world regarding vaccination".

=== Beliefs ===
The group is strongly against any form of compulsory vaccination, but Dorey disputes that the group is an anti-vaccine organisation. "We don't believe we have the right to tell people whether or not to vaccinate", says Dorey who adds, "but neither does the government." She claims that the group is just trying to fill "the information void" created by a pro-vaccine government and medical community that ignores negative information. Dorey considers herself, "pro-information and pro-choice".

Independent commentators generally reject these claims and point to numerous errors and distortions in AVN's statements about vaccines. Julie Leask from the University of Sydney, challenges AVN's claim that it is not anti-vaccination, by referring to the numerous examples of anti-vaccination rhetoric published by the AVN. In 2009, the Australian Broadcasting Corporation described the AVN as the "stronghold of the anti-vaccination movement" in Australia. In 2012 the AVN website promoted the anti-vaccination children's book Melanie's Marvelous Measles as well as T-shirts with "Love Them, Protect Them, Never Inject Them" printed on them.

The NSW Northern Rivers region, where the AVN is located, in 2007 had a childhood vaccination rate of only 70% compared to the national average of over 90%. In 2016 a recent National Health Performance Authority report showed the region's average vaccination rate for 5 year olds was reportedly still the lowest in the country at 89.2%. The North Coast Assistant Public Health Director warned "Pockets of unvaccinated people in the region was the cause for the rise and fall in whooping cough cases... because we do not have herd immunity to the illness on the Northern Rivers".

The Australian Vaccination-Skeptics Network believes that vaccines contain a variety of toxic ingredients that have no place in the human body. The group argues that these alleged toxins can cause autism, ADHD, brain damage, and cancer, among other serious side effects. In response to medical and scientific research that shows few side effects to most vaccines, Dorey argues that doctors are very hesitant to report adverse reactions and thus the data is highly skewed. These claims are false: while minor side effects such as soreness, swelling, and fever are not uncommon, no large scale scientific study has found evidence of more serious reactions and the purported link to autism is refuted.

Former president Meryl Dorey claimed that most doctors are not fully informed about vaccination research and that the medical community as a whole relies on "selective evidence" to back its argument. She says there is a "very, very strong effort" by the government and mainstream medical community to suppress any information that may cause parents to question the safety of vaccines. Consequently, Dorey argues, doctors often don't adequately warn patients of potential vaccination risks. Several critics have pointed out that AVN itself is guilty of ignoring evidence not favourable to the anti-vaccination point of view and the NSW Health Care Complaints Commission (HCCC) found that the AVN routinely ignore information that is not favourable to its anti-vaccination position. The HCCC accused the AVN of deceptively removing selected parts of stories when they report on them, and the misrepresentation of the conclusions of reliable studies. Dorey countered that she was not guilty of selective reporting, and that she "simply quoted the sections that [she] felt were important". In reality, doctors have access to extensive information on vaccine safety and the medical literature includes all known significant potential adverse reactions.

The AVN has also questioned the effectiveness of vaccines. While admitting that infection rates dropped dramatically in the twentieth century, they argue that the change is due in large part to improved hygiene and living conditions. Dorey has argued that infection rates were already on the decline before vaccines were invented and that effectiveness has "never been scientifically tested." Scientific evidence disputes this opinion by AVN. Dorey has also stated that the "vast majority" of people who contract disease have previously been vaccinated. Infectious disease specialist Paul Goldwater acknowledged a few vaccines are not completely effective, but said others were nearly 100% effective. In all cases, he said, "the benefits certainly outweigh any risks." The group has also expressed doubts about the cost-benefit ratio and effectiveness of flu vaccines. AVN's arguments are well-known and long debunked anti-vaccine tropes.

Dorey has written that "passing through a measles infection is sometimes required, for whatever reason, to strengthen some part of a person's vital force", and that diseases such as measles, mumps, rubella and chicken pox are benign conditions that do not kill children in industrialized countries. During a studio debate on Channel 7's Sunday Night current affairs program covering the death of a four-week-old baby from whooping cough, Dorey claimed that no one ever dies from the disease, and described her own children's case of the disease as a "storm in a teacup" that was easily handled with natural remedies. The NSW Health Care Complaints Commission criticised the AVN's position, saying that it "ignores the risks of exposure to, and the adverse effects of childhood illnesses". Independent data shows that measles causes the most vaccine-preventable deaths of any disease. It resulted in about 96,000 deaths in 2013. Before immunization in the United States between three and four million cases occurred each year, and the fatality rate is approximately 0.2% of those infected. Most of those who are infected and who die are less than five years old.

Infectious disease specialist Peter McIntyre has accused the group of manipulating research and statistics in order to make its case. "It's been a real characteristic of the anti-vaccine movement ... [to claim] to be looking very extensively at the scientific evidence," says McIntyre, "[but their conclusions are] really a complete misinterpretation." Paediatrician Chris Ingall says that the AVN's efforts are "negative, destructive and [have] no scientific basis." Australian Medical Association SA state president Andrew Lavender states that groups like the Australian Vaccination-Skeptics Network "[act] on very little information and ... [pose] a risk to others."

Dorey argues that scientific studies cannot be trusted because they are usually funded, she claims, by biomedicine and pharmaceutical companies that develop and manufacture vaccine products, and that doctors have "financial incentives" to push vaccines. In fact, paediatricians often lose money on vaccinations.

According to The Panic Virus, by Seth Mnookin; then AVN President Meryl Dorey signed a petition claiming "that the "AIDS industry and the media" had tricked the public into believing that the HIV virus causes AIDS".

When during a government inquiry in 2015, Greens senator Di Natale asked AVN why they still referred to themselves as the "Australian Vaccination Network", a name they have been legally instructed to cease using, AVN member Brett Smith accused Di Natale of being part of a Murdoch media conspiracy. Journalist Bernard Keane noted this is the first time anyone had suggested a conspiratorial link between The Greens and a media organisation that has been highly critical of the party.

In April 2007, Meryl Dorey compared a NSW Health policy change requiring immunisation for its workers to Nazi concentration camps saying "these are the sorts of [immunisation] tactics you would expect in concentration camps, not the sort of tactics you would expect in the Australian health-care system." The policy was also opposed by some civil libertarian and health-care groups, but the NSW Nurses' Association noted that "vaccinations have always been compulsory for health workers" and that the change was only a minimal update to the existing policy.

== Activism ==
"The scaremongering that anti vaccination campaigners engage in extends to the real world, where they threaten and bully the opposition. And what is scarier again is that the AVN is actively trying to stop parents who have lost children to deadly - but preventable - diseases, from speaking out about the need to vaccinate."

— Mamamia Magazine, 27 May 2013.

The Australian Vaccination-Skeptics Network has regularly opposed the pro-vaccine positions adopted by the Australian government, instead defending controversial and discredited research. AVN also distributes literature, sponsors seminars, and collects adverse reaction reports.

In a 1996 editorial, AVN spoke out against a proposal to add vaccination centres to some shopping centres. Writing on behalf of AVN, Susan Lindberg called the idea "downright dangerous," asking "what if a baby has a fit or major reaction?" She also added that parents are under enough pressure to vaccinate already.

In response to a 2002 proposal to extend free vaccination programs, Former AVN president Meryl Dorey argued that the Australian government should first do independent tests of the new vaccines. She said that she had doubts about the accuracy of the existing studies that were "funded ... by the pharmaceutical companies." A member of the government's immunisation advisory group countered that they always assess all available scientific data.

In August 2004, AVN spoke out against combination vaccines being considered by health authorities. The organisation claimed that there were too many untested variables and that it was irresponsible to keep combining vaccines without knowing the effects. In 2006, Meryl Dorey continued the attack on combined vaccines, claiming it was un-natural, as "It is a fact that [humans] will only ever contract one disease at a time." According to the British Medical Journal combined vaccines have actually shown reduced side effects, and it is quite common for humans to suffer simultaneously from several infections.

In 2011 social scientist Brian Martin wrote an essay "Debating vaccination" in Living Wisdom, on "attacks" and "suppression" AVN members faced. In a media release the University of Wollongong stated vaccination "should be freely debated" and that the 20,000-word paper was "intended to assist readers - especially members of the AVN itself", in ways to respond to criticism and better understand scientific controversy. Martin is a former member of the AVN.

=== Adverse reaction reports ===
In December 1996, AVN presented Federal Health Minister Michael Wooldridge with reports on 150 cases of children claimed to have been injured by vaccines that dated back to 1991; Dorey claimed that the collection of previously unreported reactions represented the largest single collection ever presented to the Australian Government. Dorey states that many of the parents involved had previously tried to have their cases looked at, but had been told by health authorities their cases couldn't proceed because the parents lacked necessary documentation. Gavin Frost, a government vaccination adviser, said he supported increased medical reporting of vaccine side effects but doubted claims of permanent damage caused by vaccines. A published government report shows that over the 33-month period from 1 January 2000 to 30 September 2002, the AVN made a total of 11 unspecified adverse event reports, which equates to approximately one report every three months.

In July 2010, the NSW Health Care Complaints Commission criticised the AVN's adverse event reporting system as being "anecdotal and misleading".

=== Views on vaccination incentives ===
In 1997 Susan Lindberg spoke on behalf of AVN opposing the announcement of a government plan to cut child care and maternity payments to parents who didn't vaccinate their children and to give incentive payments to doctors to give vaccines; she also called for creation of a vaccine registry and adverse event reporting system to be created.

In May 2000, Meryl Dorey spoke out against cuts in child care payments for 9000 families who failed to get their children vaccinated. She called the legislation a type of "civil conscription" and said the program was likely in violation of the Constitution. Wooldridge responded that the claim was "nonsense" because the requirement was "simply a condition on government financial assistance" and that families had the choice to accept it or not.

In July 2007, AVN spoke out against the government's practice of giving pediatricians bonus incentives for immunising their patients. Dorey argued that the practice was unethical and led to doctors making decisions based on their pocket book rather than their conscience. She would later liken the payment to a bribe noting that doctors aren't paid extra for prescribing antibiotics, for example. Dorey further argued that the government began the practice in order to meet World Health Organization mandates on vaccination percentages and thus was more interested in playing a numbers game rather than doing what was right for the nation's children. The payment was discontinued in October 2008.

The NSW Health Care Complaints Commission criticised the AVN for casting medical practitioners in a negative light as "unethical and untrustworthy without providing any cogent reasons or evidence for making such an assertion".

=== Defense of Andrew Wakefield ===
In February 2004, AVN defended Andrew Wakefield's 1998 study that suggested a possible link between autism and MMR vaccinations, implying that Wakefield had been treated unfairly and that he lost his job for "[refusing] to lie." Less than a month later, ten of the twelve scientists associated with the study retracted their conclusions. In February 2010, The Lancet formally retracted Wakefield's original 1998 article following an independent investigation that concluded Wakefield had been "dishonest, violated basic research ethics rules and showed a 'callous disregard' for the suffering of children involved in his research".

On 24 May 2010, immediately following the striking-off of Mr. Wakefield by the British General Medical Council for "gross misconduct" and "bringing the medical profession into disrepute", the AVN continued to support him, issuing the following statement: "Dr Wakefield knows that he has the love and respect of tens of thousands if not hundreds of thousands of parents around the world. Whether or not the GMC which is stacked with corrupt influences strikes him off is of no consequence. He will continue his work and autistic families everywhere will benefit as a result." In a statement following the ruling, Wakefield said "I never made the claim at the time, nor do I still make the claim that MMR is a cause of autism."

=== Actions against the Australian Measles Control Campaign ===
Prior to the commencement of the 1998 Australian Measles Control Campaign, the AVN initiated a campaign against it, for example accusing the Federal Government of using bullying tactics, overstating the effectiveness of the vaccine and understating the potential side effects. In July AVN said that they were instigating a Federal Court injunction against the campaign, to try to force it to change the information booklet and to simplify the forms required to obtain an exemption. The AVN's statements prompted the Federal Minister for Health to describe the group as "deceitful crackpots", while the results of the campaign showed there were just 89 adverse reactions, and that the campaign resulted in a large increase of measles and rubella immunity levels.

At a Perth anti-vaccination seminar on 1 June 2010, Dorey was critical of the government's introduction of the measles vaccine to Australia in 1970, saying "We introduced a vaccine for a disease which was killing almost nobody and one has to ask, why?" Mortality data shows that during the decade 1966 to 1975, there were 146 certified deaths from measles in Australia while in the decade 1996 to 2005, there were zero deaths directly attributed to measles, and one death due to the measles complication SSPE. The decline in mortality is attributed to Australia's high measles vaccination rates achieving the elimination of endemic measles transmission in Australia.

In 2014 Australia was declared by the WHO as having eliminated local strains of measles. But as of 2015/16 deadly measles cases had returned to Australia.

=== Campaign against the meningococcal vaccine ===
The AVN campaigned against the introduction of a meningococcal vaccine to Australia in 2002. Meryl Dorey accused the government of wasting A$41 million on the vaccination program, claimed that the vaccine had shown a large number of adverse reactions in the United Kingdom and had never been tested for effectiveness. However the vice-president of the AMA, Trevor Mudge, refuted her claims, pointing out that meningococcal disease is extremely dangerous and that "Vaccination really is the only strategy for this condition that is likely to work". He said the vaccine had been extensively tested and contrary to Dorey's claims had been found to be safe and highly effective in the UK. During an online debate covering meningococcal vaccination in 2005, Australian infectious disease specialist Peter McIntyre warned parents "not to be fooled by the limited and biased information from [the] AVN website."

The rate of invasive meningococcal disease in Australia fell by more than 60% between 2002 (when vaccination commenced) and 2009, after doubling during the previous decade. Mortality data from the UK shows that meningococcal deaths decreased from 67 to 5 in the two years following implementation of the vaccine. The NSW HCCC criticised the AVN for selectively using information to support its position, when there is no evidence to support their claims, and that the evidence suggests that the most effective meningococcal strategy is to widely vaccinate.

=== Campaign against the pertussis (whooping cough) vaccine ===
Following the death of four-week-old Dana McCaffery from pertussis (whooping cough) in March 2009, and the subsequent government campaigns to improve pertussis immunisation, the AVN launched a campaign against the pertussis vaccine, using the death of the child in the campaign materials, claiming that the she did not die from pertussis.

The AVN's public campaign against the pertussis vaccine began with an article in the May 2009 issue of Living Wisdom written by Meryl Dorey, which questioned the safety and effectiveness of the vaccine and the dangers of whooping cough itself. Critics pointed out that Dorey's article contained numerous errors of fact and omission. While the article correctly stated that Sweden had previously withdrawn pertussis vaccination in 1979 due to research showing it was ineffective, she failed to reveal that the vaccine then used in Sweden was different to the effective vaccine used in other countries such as Australia, nor did she reveal that Sweden reintroduced pertussis vaccination in 1996 and this had resulted in huge incidence reduction, with cases falling by 80–90% within 3 years. In the article, Dorey claims that "Whooping Cough is not a vaccine-preventable disease". Critics point out that evidence has shown that the acellular vaccine is 84% efficacious, and prevents 99.8% of infant hospital admissions after a completing a full course of three doses of the vaccine.

Their campaign against the vaccine continued during two Channel 7 Sunday Night television programs, where Dorey made the claim that "no-one ever dies of Whooping Cough". During the debates, the facts surrounding the death of Dana McCaffery from whooping cough were disputed by Dorey and other AVN members, and it was alleged that the infant's parents had received hatemail from AVN supporters for their public pro-vaccination stance following the death of their daughter. The filming of this program was the catalyst for the formation of the Stop the AVN group.

AVN members continued to harass the McCafferys through to July 2010 by sending emails, letters and AVN brochures to the family. Former AVN president Meryl Dorey wrote another blog disputing the McCafferys' version of events, the treatments and effects Dana suffered and the diagnosis of pertussis. Dana's mother attempted to get the government intervene, to stop the harassment. In a subsequent television interview for ABC Lateline, Dorey admitted she had accused the McCafferys of "turning their daughter into a martyr because she supposedly died of whooping cough".

In 2012 the AVN continued to target the McCafferys. AVN member and University of Wollongong researcher Judy Wilyman was published on AVN's website accusing the State Government of using the imagery of four-week-old Dana's death to push the vaccine stating it was the "Government and the media who have been using the McCafferys to promote a vaccine". She also questioned whether the McCafferys had been paid to promote the whooping cough vaccine. The McCaffery family vigorously denied these claims. In March 2016 Wilyman continued to repeat that such child deaths are "anecdotal" and provoke the parents of the deceased children saying they are "promoting the death of their child to whooping cough, and lobby groups ... have provided awards to these parents for their efforts [and] they receive financial rewards from pro-vaccine lobby groups for their efforts".

=== Campaign against the swine flu vaccine ===
In September 2009, AVN campaigned against the swine flu vaccine, calling it "madness" to use a vaccine which they claimed was "laden with toxic mercury." Dorey further argued that more testing was needed on the vaccine before it was offered to the public and that it could prove to be more dangerous than the flu itself. She told the Australian Broadcasting Corporation that the swine flu should be treated no differently from the seasonal flu and that the government was wasting money by spending over a hundred million dollars on the vaccine. Dorey's claims were rejected by the Australian Medical Association and other medical experts.

=== Anti-vaccination seminars and public talks ===
In May 2010 the AVN announced that they would be hosting a seminar in Perth, Western Australia, to be held at the Uniting Church In The City (UCIC) on 14 May. However following a campaign by members of the Church, the medical community and members of the Stop the AVN group, the Church announced that they would not allow the AVN to use their premises for the seminar, as they were "concerned that there may be a public perception that the UCIC does not support childhood vaccinations due to the AVN seminar being held at UCIC's rooms". The AVN rescheduled and relocated the event for 1 June at the State Library of WA. The decision by the Library to allow the AVN to use their premises was widely criticised by the medical community and politicians, with the president of the Australian Medical Association saying he "was worried the use of the venue could give the group credibility" and the Shadow Arts Minister, John Hyde, saying "Why should a group that endangers the lives of WA children be allowed to speak and promote their cause at a taxpayer-funded venue dedicated to learning?" Two days after the event, Fiona Stanley AC was interviewed by Perth Radio about the seminar, describing the views presented by the AVN as "bizarre", and "so misinformed that it is scary".

In Dec 2011, organisers of the Woodford Folk Festival were criticised for inviting Meryl Dorey to speak. The Queensland Health Minister Geoff Wilson advised attendees "not to take [Dorey's] nonsense too seriously". The Australian Medical Association described the group's views as "dangerous", and said organisers "had a responsibility to add speakers who could provide the medically approved side of the argument" so the audience were aware of "the risk of the information being presented [by Dorey]". Community pressure intensified resulting in Andreas Suhrbier, head of the immunovirology laboratory at the Queensland Institute of Medical Research, to appear and field questions from the audience.

=== Objection to "No Jab No Pay/Play" ===
AVN have promoted the Church of Conscious Living, described in the Sydney Morning Herald as a "fake", and in the Daily Telegraph as a "sham" church set up to provide spurious religious exemptions from vaccination. The NSW Health Minister said she was "alarmed that a 'religion' would be created to thwart an important public health initiative." In April 2015 the "no jab, no pay" policy was introduced and the Abbott Federal Government made it more difficult for people to object to vaccination on religious grounds, and required that religions register their objection to vaccination. The policy officially came into effect in January 2016 and reportedly "sparked a rush on vaccines as parents fear missing out" on Family Tax Benefit Part A supplement and childcare subsidies.

AVsN president Tasha David and former president Meryl Dorey both appeared on an "expert panel" at a February 2016 anti vaccine event in Mullumbimby (which has the lowest vaccination rates in Australia) at which other ways of evading no jab no play/pay rules were discussed, including falsely claiming "hypersensitivity" to gelatin or yeast, in order to obtain medical exemption. It was reported in The Daily Telegraph that Tasha David and Meryl Dorey were at the event to "prove that Australia was a testing ground for the rest of the world".

In March 2016 the AVN announced its intention to legally challenge the Federal 'no jab no pay' laws, with the return of spokesperson Meryl Dorey stating "[w]hat the government is doing is unconstitutional, immoral and illegal, and they need to be shown the error of their ways". In one announcement AVN falsely stated that Royal Australian College of General Practitioners and the National Centre for Immunisation Research & Surveillance also opposed the 'No Jab No Pay' legislation. Both organisations promptly rejected AVN's claim and clarified they supported the legislation. By December AVN had raised AUD$152,000 toward the legal challenge, then on Christmas Day announced it was dropping the legal action, citing a "poor chance of success".

=== COVID-19 and SARS-CoV-2 ===
In 2020, the group suggested SARS-CoV-2, the virus that causes COVID-19, "is just the common cold", and people have been "fooled" by a "fear campaign on the silly sheep media". Dorey questioned the COVID-19 pandemic saying: "Are you being lied to?" Requesting that followers "take your phones and pop into the local hospital" and "Let us know how crowded it is - or is not. Is coronavirus really overwhelming our nation or is our nation overwhelming us with lies and killing our economy and us?"

== Complaints, investigations and criticisms ==
The AVN has been the subject of several complaints to (and investigations by) Government departments and medical authorities. Medical professionals, scientists and other proponents of vaccination are highly critical of the AVN.

=== NSW Health Care Complaints Commission (HCCC) ===
In August 2009, Ken McLeod filed a complaint against AVN with the New South Wales Health Care Complaints Commission. The complaint, which was supported by the group Australian Skeptics, said that the organisation was in breach of the Health Care Complaints Act because it made "unsubstantiated health claims based on 'conspiracy theories', pseudo-scientific evidence and debunked research." The complaint was also supported by Australian entrepreneur Dick Smith.

In response to the complaint, the AVN submitted a 27-page document which argued that they are not actively providing health care service and therefore are not under the jurisdiction of the Health Care Complaints Commission. Dorey called the complaint vexatious and a nuisance tactic.

Tom Sidwell, a Monash University Immunology student, conducted a review of the sources and information provided in the AVN's HCCC reply. He submitted to the HCCC that all of the sources quoted by Dorey in the reply were either not from peer-reviewed journals as Dorey had claimed, or did not actually support the conclusions she was attributing to them. In an article published in the Journal of the Australian Skeptics, Sidwell wrote:

"The collection of references is, on the whole, laughable. At best she hasn't read the papers she cites and includes them out of ignorance, and at worst she is being deliberately deceptive."

==== HCCC ruling ====
The HCCC concluded their investigation into the AVN in July 2010. The Commission determined that "the health education service provided by the Australian Vaccination Network on its website provides misleading and inaccurate information on the subject of vaccination".

In addition, the Commission found that the AVN "misleads readers by using reliable and peer-reviewed research, but quoting selectively from it, often in contradiction to the conclusions or findings of the studies themselves".

The Commission ordered the AVN to permanently place the following information in a prominent place on their website within 14 days:

- The Australian Vaccination Network's purpose is to provide information against vaccination in order to balance what it believes is the substantial amount of pro-vaccination information available elsewhere;
- The information provided should not be read as medical advice; and
- The decision about whether or not to vaccinate should be made in consultation with a health care provider.

Following the AVN's refusal to display the notice, on 26 July 2010 the HCCC issued a public warning about the group stating

"The AVN's failure to include a notice on its website of the nature recommended by the Commission may result in members of the public making improperly informed decisions about whether or not to vaccinate, and therefore poses a risk to public health and safety."

The NSW HCCC's ruling was further supported by the Chief Medical Officer of Victoria, who agreed that the AVN "should make it clear what their views are and if it's an extreme view about a certain topic it should be clear that it is their view and that they're not speaking on behalf of for example the medical profession".

==== Supreme Court appeal ====
The AVN appealed the HCCC ruling to the NSW Supreme Court, arguing that the HCCC does not have jurisdiction over Meryl Dorey or the AVN. In February 2012, the court ruled that the AVN is a health care provider, and therefore the HCCC does have jurisdiction over their activities. However, it ruled that the original complaints to the HCCC about the AVN were invalid because the complaints did not include evidence that anyone had actually acted on the incorrect advice provided by the AVN. The court did not make a judgement about the validity of the complaints, nor the information contained within them.

==== Changes to HCCC Act and new investigation ====
The ruling resulted in a change in the law, allowing HCCC to initiate proceedings based on likelihood of harm, rather than having to wait for actual injury. Following the passage of the Health Legislation Amendment Bill 2013 by the Parliament of New South Wales, giving the HCCC powers to initiate investigations, and explore medical advice provided more generally than under the previous act, the NSW Premier Barry O'Farrell announced that the Health Minister has advised NSW Parliament the Health Care Complaints Commission is launching an investigation into the Australian Vaccination Network.

The HCCC concluded a second investigation into AVN in 2014 and published a new warning statement. The second public warning went further by scientifically addressing specific medical misinformation disseminated by AVN and concluded:

"The Commission has established that AVN does not provide reliable information in relation to certain vaccines and vaccination more generally... AVN's dissemination of misleading, misrepresented and incorrect information about vaccination engenders fear and alarm and is likely to detrimentally affect the clinical management or care of its readers... the Commission urges general caution is exercised when using AVN's website or Facebook page to research vaccination and to consult other reliable sources, including speaking to a medical practitioner, to make an informed decision".

=== NSW Office of Liquor, Gaming and Racing (OLGR) investigation ===
Following complaints that the AVN had been illegally fundraising without authority between 2 July 2007 and 2 June 2009, and a previous warning relating to the AVN being in breach of its fundraising authority conditions (as it did not have a "mechanism to properly and effectively deal with complaints relating to fundraising"), the NSW Office of Liquor, Gaming and Racing (OLGR) announced in February 2010 that they would conduct a full audit of the groups fundraising activities.

==== OLGR Ruling ====
On 4 August 2010, the OLGR announced that their audit of the AVN had "detected a number of breaches of charity fund-raising laws", including:

- Fundraising without authority;
- Unauthorised expenditure;
- Failure to keep proper records of income and expenditure;
- Possible breaches of the Charitable Trust Act, 1993, which would be referred to the Department of Justice and the Attorney General.

The AVN was given 28 days to respond to the findings. President Meryl Dorey declined to comment on the issue.

===== Revocation of authority to fundraise =====
Public notice. Revocation of A.V.N. Inc's authority to fundraise under Charitable Fundraising Act. NSW State Gazette No. 41, 2010, p. 5253.

On 14 October 2010, the Hon. Kevin Greene, M.P. revoked the AVN's authority to fundraise, meaning they are no longer permitted to conduct appeals or receive donations from members of the public. Reasons for the revocation were given as breaches of sections 31 (1) a, b and f of the Charitable Fundraising Act 1991:

- Their fundraising appeals have not been conducted in good faith for charitable purposes;
- Their fundraising appeals have been improperly administered;
- Their fundraising activities are not in the public interest.

In response to the revocation, the AVN issued a media release criticising the OLGR's decision as being politically motivated, and difficult to understand given that the "revocation was based entirely upon the questionable decision by the HCCC", rather than upon "the simple errors" detected by the OLGR during their audit of the organisation. Dorey appealed for the public to make donations to the AVN before the revocation took effect on 20 October 2010.

===== Supreme Court appeal =====
As part of their appeal to the NSW Supreme Court in relation to the HCCC complaint, the AVN asked the court to invalidate the OLGR's revocation of their fundraising authority, asking them to grant certiorari. In February 2012, the Court rejected AVN's argument, dismissed this particular complaint, and the fundraising prohibition remained.

=== NSW Office of Fair Trading name change order ===
In December 2012, the New South Wales Office of Fair Trading issued an order for the AVN to change its name within two months or be de-registered. The letter of action was delivered to the home of the organisation's president, Meryl Dorey. It described the name as misleading and a detriment to the community. The Fair Trading Minister, Anthony Roberts, said that issue of vaccination was one of life and death and that the organisation's activities endangered people's safety. Mr Roberts has warned other states against the AVN trying to register. Robert Vellar, the NSW Fair Trading Assistant Commissioner for Compliance and Enforcement, says the AVN's name has misled parents seeking information. Mr Vellar added that the NSW government intended to change definitions in the Associations Act to prevent groups from using names that were in conflict with their charter. The president of the AMA (NSW), Assoc Prof Brian Owler, said the AVN needed to take responsibility for information it gave to parents. The AVN is fighting the renaming order in the courts.

This order was challenged by the group. The challenge was dismissed, and on 25 November 2013 the New South Wales Office of Fair Trading order was upheld by the Administrative Decisions Tribunal. In February 2014 the group changed its name to the Australian Vaccination-Skeptics Network.

=== Comparison of vaccination to rape ===
In April 2015 the AVN Facebook page drew international attention for publishing a simulated rape photo ad with text saying that vaccinations are "forced penetration" and asking "do you really 'need' control over your own body?" It drew criticism from the CEO of Domestic Violence Victoria, the Federal shadow Minister for Health Catherine King MP, the Federal Minister for Health Sussan Ley MP, the president of the AMA, the NSW Rape Crisis Centre, as well as supporters of the group.

Catherine King MP said that "equating doctors with rapists shows how completely unhinged the AVN has become". AVN responded: "This post isn't tasteless - it is honest. What truly IS tasteless is our elected government trying to tell us that we have to vaccinate our children even if we don't believe it is best for their health". President of the AVN, Tasha David, claimed her organisation did not own or control the page. Within days the Facebook group was reported as having been shut down. It was not the first time AVN had allegedly used vaccination-rape comparison, in 2011 it tweeted "court orders rape of a child" in relation to a court ordering a five-year-old girl to be vaccinated.

=== Other controversies ===
In March 2007, the AVN made certain erroneous comments on their website, including claims that the Australian Medical Association(AMA) received funding from pharmaceutical companies and actively censored information provided to its members. These claims were factually incorrect, and the AMA took legal action against the AVN. The AVN withdrew the claims and issued a public apology on 21 March 2007.

In 2011, the Australian Vaccination Network's advice against vaccination, and their refusal to display the HCCC safety warning on their website, was included in Australian Doctor magazine's Top 50 Medical Scandals of the past 50 years.

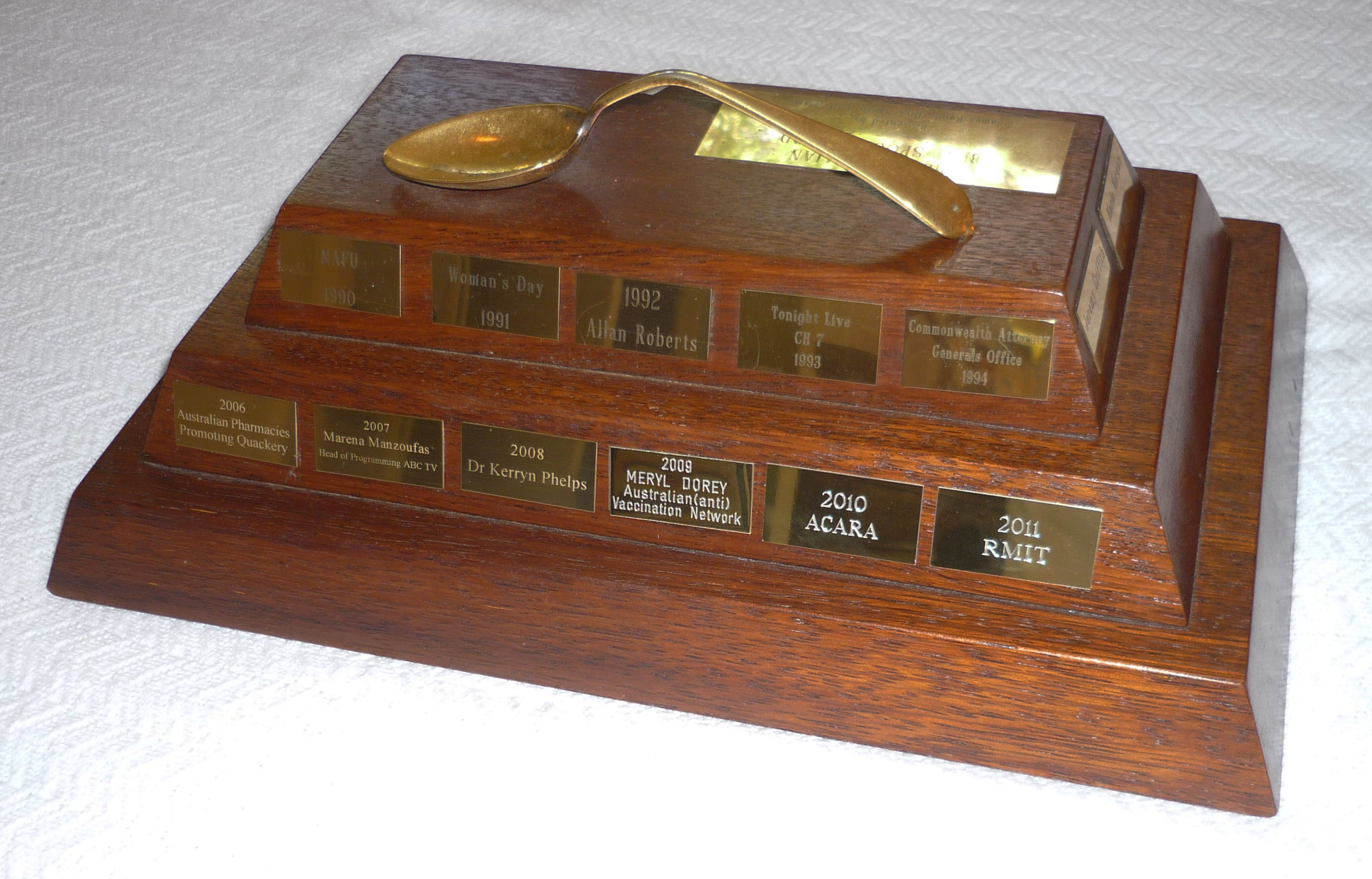
2009 winners: Meryl Dorey & The Australian (anti)Vaccination Network

The Australian Skeptics awarded their Bent Spoon Award, "presented annually to the perpetrator of the most preposterous piece of paranormal or pseudoscientific piffle", to Meryl Dorey and the AVN in 2009, stating that the award had been earned through their "scaremongering and misinformation about childhood vaccination". In response, Dorey stated that winning the award meant she was "on the right track".

In September 2010, the AVN was accused of numerous copyright breaches relating to their sale of information packs containing photocopies of selected parts of old medical journal articles, newspaper reports and cartoons. After receiving complaints from authors and copyright holders, the AVN withdrew the packs from sale on their website. Several authors stated that they had not given permission for the AVN to reproduce the material and would seek payment for their past use. They also criticised the AVN's use of the articles as they were "old and not based on current information".

=== Political criticisms ===
==== Federal Parliament ====
Following the AVN's public objections to the Australian Government's 1998 Australian Measles Control Campaign, the then Federal Health Minister Michael Wooldridge issued a media release which was highly critical of the group, writing:

"I am deeply concerned that media organisations risk giving credibility to the crackpot views of the AVN by publishing, without question, their untrue and deceitful claims. Ultimately, young children who are particularly vulnerable to measles could suffer if their parents were influenced by the anti-science, irrational views of the AVN."

In 2013, Greens Senator Richard Di Natale put forward a motion calling for the Australian Vaccination Network to be disbanded, citing the risks that low-levels of vaccination posed to the health of children in Australia. The motion was passed by the Australian Senate. Senator Di Natale condemned the organisation, stating in a press release:

"The AVN have gone so far as to promote measles as a healthy gift from mother nature and not the deadly disease it really is. As a doctor, I saw first-hand the tragedy these easily preventable diseases can cause.
Today the Senate has joined with the public health community to send a clear and strong message to those who are peddling lies about vaccines - they should pack up and go home."

==== NSW Parliament ====
In a response to a parliamentary question about the AVN's statements regarding the MMR vaccine, in September 2012 the NSW Minister for Health and Minister for Medical Research said:

"The Australian Vaccination Network has not provided accurate information to parents about the risks and benefits of immunisation. Any link between the measles vaccine and autism has been conclusively discredited by numerous studies and reviews by credible experts, including the World Health Organization, the American Academy of Paediatrics and the UK Medical Research Council."

During the NSW parliamentary debate on the Health Legislation Amendment Bill 2013, the ALP's Andrew McDonald (Shadow Health Minister at the time) warned that the AVN's name and website were "designed to mislead unsuspecting community members to believe that a balanced view about immunisation is being presented" and that "When provoked, Australian Vaccination Network's fellow travellers can and do behave reprehensibly," while a Liberal state parliamentarian, Matt Kean, described the AVN as "a group of flat-earthers and wing-nuts who believe that vaccination is unnecessary. Indeed, the group has claimed that vaccination is harmful to individuals, which is contrary to all the scientific evidence." In further debate, members of parliament described the AVN as "placing children at risk", "negligent", "misleading" and "disreputable".

The late NSW Greens MLC John Kaye lobbied against what he called AVN's "voodoo claims and conspiracy theories". Describing AVN as "disgraceful", he said: "Spreading misinformation about childhood immunisation could be deadly".

In the NSW Legislative Council, Peter Phelps described the AVN as "insane", while Trevor Khan called the AVN a "danger to public health" for "touting unscientific propaganda".

Anthony John Roberts, the state's Minister for Fair Trading, said that "It is incredibly irresponsible for an avowedly anti-vaccination group to advertise itself as a balanced source of information on vaccination. Such action is not only misleading to the public but also dangerous to those who believe they are referring to evidence-based medical advice..." The Government, the medical community and the Australian Medical Association led by Associate Professor Brian Owler are in agreement that the name Australian Vaccination Network "is unacceptable".

==== Queensland Parliament ====
In December 2011 the Queensland Minister for Health, Geoffrey Wilson, issued a media statement criticising the AVN with the following comment, "For the small number of people who might be entertained by what Ms Dorey has to say, Woodford Folk Festival has a place for everyone. Just don't take her nonsense too seriously." To this, Wilson added, "The fact is vaccinations have saved millions of lives. Their invention was a miracle of scientific achievement."

=== Other criticisms ===
During 2002 while speaking in the New South Wales Legislative Council about low vaccination rates in the NSW Northern Rivers region, Liberal politician Brian Pezzutti criticised Meryl Dorey:

"only 60 per cent of children in the Byron Bay area in the 12 to 15 month age group - the very young and most vulnerable - are immunised. That is mainly because of the activities of a woman called Meryl Dorey, who lives in Byron Bay and who has decided not to immunise her children and who regularly claims that immunisation is not necessary. She campaigns against immunisation."

Australian entrepreneur Dick Smith, who had previously run a national ad in The Australian asking parents to ignore AVN's claims, has been highly critical of the organisation, stating:

"They are actually anti-vaccination, and they should put on every bit of their material that they are anti-vaccination in great big words. They have every right for that belief but they should communicate it clearly so people are not misled." and
"I think they're choosing not to vaccinate because they don't understand risk management - they are told that there is a risk with vaccination - now everything in life has a risk. There's a minute risk but it's been proved all over the world that the advantages far outweigh the risk."

Following the AVN's decision to hold an anti-vaccination seminar at the Western Australian State Library, the Shadow Arts Minister John Hyde criticised the state Government for allowing the group to "push its anti-vaccine message", saying:

"Why should a group that endangers the lives of WA children be allowed to speak and promote their cause at a taxpayer-funded venue dedicated to learning? Their dangerous propaganda which is putting children at risk of polio, smallpox, cholera and other preventable diseases should not be able to gain respectability by using the good name of the State Library."

During an interview on ABC Lateline in July 2010, the 1997 Australian of the Year and 1996 Nobel Prize for Medicine laureate, immunologist Peter C. Doherty described the AVN's attempts to reduce the child immunisation rate as a "Crime against Humanity".

In 2011 skeptic Brian Dunning listed AVN as #4 on his "Top 10 Worst Anti-Science Websites" list.

In a 2016 press release responding to questions from AVN's Meryl Dorey, the Australian Sex Party publicly stated:

"The safety and efficacy of vaccination is not an area of scientific controversy. The claim that governments and scientists are all conspiring to mislead us ... is absurd and irresponsible... The claims of the anti-vaccination movement have been thoroughly debunked. Choosing not to vaccinate your children amounts to medical neglect; this is a serious ethical issue... We at the Australian Sex Party would like to encourage parents who are questioning what's right for their children, to follow the advice of the scientific and medical communities, rather than charlatans and conspiracy theorists".

=== Stop the Australian Vaccination Network group ===
In May 2009, immediately after the filming of the second Sunday Night television program covering the Pertussis death of Dana McCaffery, the Stop the AVN group was formed by Daniel Raffaele to "challenge the Australian Vaccination Network (AVN)". Members of the group began investigating the information provided by the AVN, and submitted complaints to the HCCC and OLGR. The AVN's Meryl Dorey accused the group of "attacking the AVN unfairly".

In November 2010, the Australian Skeptics collectively presented the 2700 members of the SAVN group with the Skeptic of the Year award, and SAVN members Ken McLeod and Wendy Wilkinson with the Thornett Award For the Promotion Of Reason.

=== American Airlines cancels an AVN advertisement ===
In April 2012, American Airlines pulled an AVN ad that was scheduled to appear on American Airlines' in-flight TV channel. Dorey stated that "We were offered a three minute slot, but because of the controversy from 'Stop the AVN' we lost it."

Founder of the 'Stop the AVN' group, Daniel Raffaele, who initiated the campaign to stop the ad commented, "Basically when it comes to information the AVN provides misinformation."

=== Therapeutic Goods Administration complaint ===
The AVN has been the subject of a complaint over the advertising of black salve, and the complaint was found to be justified by the Therapeutic Goods Administration's Complaints Resolution Panel. The Panel's determination was issued on 3 December 2012. On 16 May 2013, the delegate of the Secretary to the Department of Health and Ageing decided to order the AVN to carry out actions as the AVN had not fully complied with the Panel's determination.

Dorey and Leon Pittard (of Fair Dinkum Radio) have been the subject of an additional complaint, which was also found to be justified. Dorey has presented a Freeman on the land defence in relation to that complaint.

== See also ==
- Misinformation related to vaccination - for general misinformation spread by groups such as the Australian Vaccination-risks Network
- Northern Rivers Vaccination Supporters - a non-government advocacy group raising awareness of the importance of vaccination in the Northern Rivers region of the New South Wales
