= Northern Rivers Vaccination Supporters =

Organization

The Northern Rivers Vaccination Supporters
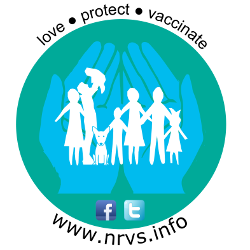
- The logo for The Northern Rivers Vaccination Supporters
- Formation: 2013
- Type: Non-governmental advocacy group
- Purpose: Raising awareness of the importance of vaccination in the Northern Rivers region of the New South Wales state of Australia
- Members: 250 (2019)
- Core Administrators: Dr Rachel Heap and Heidi Robertson
- Website: http://nrvs.info/

The Northern Rivers Vaccination Supporters (NRVS) is a vaccination advocacy group formed in 2013 by people who were concerned about low vaccination rates in the Northern Rivers region of the Australian state of New South Wales. Rachel Heap, one of the group's core administrators, has said the organization's primary goal is to spread the word that people shouldn't be afraid of vaccines, but instead, "you should be amazed at how extraordinary they are as a public health measure".

In 2014, the group was presented the Thornett Award for the Promotion of Reason by the Australian Skeptics. In 2016, the World Health Organization (WHO) endorsed the NRVS website as a reliable source of information about vaccines and vaccine safety.

As of 2024, the group is on permanent hiatus, and the website is archived.

== Background ==
The Northern Rivers region of the Australian state of New South Wales has some of the lowest vaccination rates in Australia. As of 2013, the Northern Rivers town of Mullumbimby had the lowest rate of childhood vaccinations in Australia, with under 50% of one, two and five-year-old children fully vaccinated. Rachel Heap has described the Northern Rivers region as a place where "it is not only socially acceptable to refuse vaccination, but supporting vaccination carries the risk of being ostracised".

The NRVS was formed in 2013 by people who were concerned about these low vaccination rates.

Alison Gaylard helped start the group after her two daughters became ill with whooping cough. She says "We're trying to get the correct, factual information out there... And so if people out there are sourcing their information from the correct place, they won't be fed misinformation to make them think they don't have to vaccinate, or that it's scary, or anything like that." And "I would request people check their source of information. Everyone's entitled to their own opinion, but not their own facts. And science is factual" In response to her stance on vaccination, Gaylard has received hateful phone calls, much anti-vaccine material by post and has had her daughter approached by a stranger in a supermarket asking if Gaylard was her mother. Northern_Rivers_Vaccination_Supporters

Heidi Robertson contracted whooping cough whilst six months pregnant in 2008 and feared she would lose her baby. The experience motivated her to join with others who shared her concerns about low vaccination rates to found the NRVS. While Heidi acknowledges that there are people that will never get a vaccine, she and NRVS are working to educate those who are on the fence about getting vaccinated by listening to their concerns and addressing them “one cup of tea at a time.”

== Activism ==
NRVS members have made television appearances on both ABC Australia and Today on the Nine Network. Heidi Robertson featured on ABC TV discussing the Australian governments new 'no jab, no play' policy, which denied certain benefits to families who refuse vaccination. NRVS welcomed the policy. In late 2018 the ABC's 7:30 Report revisited the Northern Rivers to look at the impact of the "no jab, no play" policy. This report noted that enrollments in some pre-schools were showing large drops due to the policy and they would drop further in 2020. Early learning educators said that unintended consequences of the policy would disadvantage young unvaccinated children as they could not attend pre-school. NRVS said that this policy seemed to be one of the few ways vaccination rates were increasing and the NewDaily indicated that this was what the policy was designed to do and not putting children's lives at risk was more important than attending pre-school.

In June 2014 the NRVS presented a poster at the 14th National Immunisation Conference held in Melbourne.

In January 2015, Gaylard appeared on The Project TV show discussing calls to ban prominent anti-vaccination activist Dr Sherri Tenpenny from entering Australia, arguing that she poses a danger to public health.

Rachel Heap, a specialist in adult Intensive Care Medicine and Dave Hawkes of Stop the AVN, a virologist and science communicator, represented NRVS on a panel 'Strategic advocacy to reach vaccine hesitant parents' at an Immunisation Advocacy Workshop held in Sydney April 2015.

Gaylard appeared on episode 341 of The Skeptic Zone podcast in May 2015 in which she discussed the workshop. The episode also included interviews with Heidi Robertson and Rachel Heap.

In August 2015, Heidi Robertson and Alison Gaylard appeared on Inside Story defending vaccinations from claims made by anti-vaccine campaigner Maha Al Musa.

In 2018 a photo of a pro-vaccine poster at an Australian doctor's office that was inspired by a posting on the NRVS Facebook page by Dr. Rachel Heap went viral. It reads in part, "And what do you say when he gives influenza to his grandma? How do you explain she won't be coming home from hospital? Not ever.", and continues: "Do you tell them you didn't think these diseases were that serious? That you thought that your organic, home cooked food was enough to protect them? Do you say sorry?" The post drew worldwide attention from pro-vaccine groups, anti-vaccine groups and others.

Heap was asked why she wrote that Facebook post in a 2018 interview on breakfast television show Sunrise. She replied, "I was actually tired, and emotional, and frustrated. I had come off a pretty rough run at work looking after people suffering from stuff that should have been avoidable, and when I was listening to the conversations we were having about vaccination it seemed that something was missing, and that was the voices of their kids. Those kids have no choice, and if children are left vulnerable to preventable disease and they contract those diseases and the impact, the injury of those diseases, that can have a lifelong impact on them, and it seemed somebody needed to speak up for them."

== Awards and recognition ==
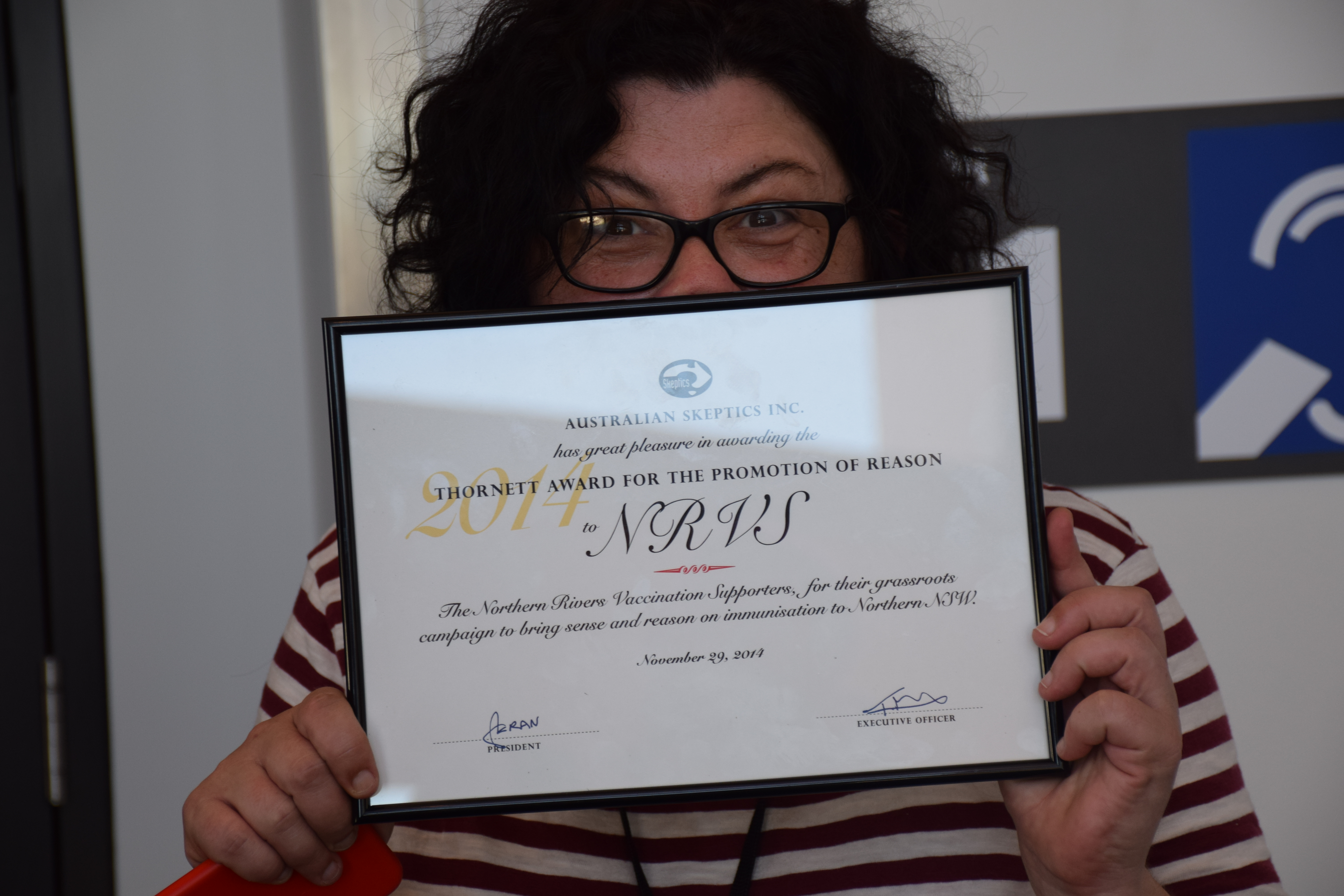
Alison Gaylard holding the Thornett Award for the promotion of reason, presented to NRVS at the 2014 Australian Skeptics National Conference

In 2014, the NRVS was awarded the Thornett Award for the Promotion of Reason at The Australian Skeptics 30th annual convention held in Sydney, Australia. The award was collected by Heidi Robertson and Alison Gaylard. The award, known colloquially known as "The Fred," acknowledges "a member of the public or a public figure who has made a significant contribution to educating or informing the public regarding issues of science and reason."

In 2016, the World Health Organization (WHO) endorsed the NRVS.info website, describing it as "a reliable source of information about vaccines and vaccine safety." The website now forms part of the Vaccine Safety Net Project (VSN) within the WHO's Global Vaccine Safety Initiative, and is evaluated by the WHO for credibility, content and accessibility/design every two years.

In 2017, the NSW Shadow Health Minister Walt Secord, praised NRVS for their "principled stand" in opposing the "dangerous views" of a touring anti-vaccination campaigner, and called for a "united approach" to increase NSW North Coast vaccination rates.
