= Doubleday (surname) =

Doubleday is a surname. Notable people with the name include:

== Publishing family ==
- Frank Nelson Doubleday (1862–1934), American businessman, founder of Doubleday & McClure Company in 1897
- Nelson Doubleday (1889–1949), American book publisher and president of Doubleday Company
- Nelson Doubleday Jr. (1933–2015), last president of Doubleday and Company
- Neltje Doubleday Kings (1934–2021), American artist and philanthropist, daughter of Nelson Doubleday
- Russell Doubleday (1872–1949), American author, editor and publisher, brother of Frank Nelson Doubleday

== New York family ==
- Abner Doubleday (1819–1893), American Civil War Union general and disputed inventor of baseball
- Mary Stewart Doubleday Cutting (1851–1924), American author and daughter of Ulysses F Doubleday
- Stephen Ward Doubleday, (1845–1926), American banker and Civil War soldier, son of Thomas D. Doubleday
- Thomas D. Doubleday (1792–1866), American bookstore owner and Civil War officer
- Ulysses Doubleday (general) (1824–1893), American Civil War general
- Ulysses F. Doubleday (1792–1866), American printer, congressman from New York, father of Thomas D. Doubleday, Abner Doubleday, Ulysses Doubleday, and Mary Stewart Doubleday Cutting

== Scientific family ==
- Edward Doubleday (1811–1849), English entomologist
- Henry Doubleday (entomologist) (1808–1875), English entomologist and ornithologist, brother of Edward Doubleday
- Henry Doubleday (horticulturalist) (1810–1902), English scientist and horticulturalist, cousin of Henry and Edward Doubleday

== Acting family ==
- Frank Doubleday (actor) (1945–2018), American actor, father of Portia Doubleday and Kaitlin Doubleday
- Kaitlin Doubleday (born 1984), American actress
- Portia Doubleday (born 1988), American actress

== Other people ==
- Arthur Doubleday, (1865–1951), Bishop of Brentwood in the Roman Catholic Church
- Edmund Doubleday (died 1620), English politician who helped capture Guy Fawkes
- Geoff Doubleday (born 1940), Australian rules footballer
- Jack Doubleday (1890–1918), Australian footballer
- John Doubleday (restorer) (about 1798 – 1856), British craftsman and restorer
- John Doubleday (sculptor) (born 1947), British painter and sculptor
- John Gordon Doubleday (1920–1982), British diplomat
- Ken Doubleday (1926–2014), Australian Olympian athlete
- Neltje Doubleday (disambiguation), several people
- Ralph R. Doubleday (1881–1958), American rodeo photographer
- Thomas Doubleday (1790–1870), English politician and author
