= Jomanda =

Dutch medium

- Born: Johanna Wilhelmina; Petronella Damman; May 5, 1948 (age 77); Deventer, Netherlands
- Occupation: Medium
- Known for: Alleged psychic abilities Sylvia Millecam death controversy

Johanna "Joke" Wilhelmina Petronella Damman (born May 5, 1948), known under her nickname Jomanda, is a controversial Dutch healing medium who refers to herself as the "Lady of the Light".

== Background ==
Born Johanna Wilhelmina Petronella Damman in Deventer, Jomanda is a Dutch spiritualist who described herself as being "a healing medium." She claims to have psychic powers of clairvoyance, empathy and prescience, aided by her late father and other powers from the "world divine". She is known to be a devoted fan of paranormal author Jozef Rulof.

== Career ==
In 1991, she gained national fame after making an appearance on a popular talk show. In the next decade, she held public gatherings in Tiel where she announced that she would be performing healings, which drew large groups of people. During these sessions she would 'infuse' bottles of tap water, which she claimed would make them gain healing properties. She also appeared on radio shows, where people were asked to put a bottle of water in front of their radio in order to have it remotely 'infused'.

== Controversy ==
In 2001, Jomanda gave medical and spiritual advice to the popular Dutch actress Sylvia Millecam, who later died of cancer. In 2004, the Dutch Health Inspectorate filed suit against Jomanda claiming that she and three alternative therapists misled Millecam by claiming that the actress was merely suffering from an inflammation. In October 2006, the investigation was dropped, but in April 2008 an Amsterdam court ruled that Jomanda and two doctors who practise alternative therapies should be prosecuted for their roles in Millecam's death. The trial started on 30 October 2008. On 12 May 2009, Ronald ter Heegde, Jomanda's former assistant, admitted on television in the Dutch news magazine Nova that Jomanda had used other persons to gather information about Sylvia Millecam. She then told Millecam she had gathered this information as a medium. On 12 June 2009, the court found Jomanda not guilty as a party to Millecam's death. The court criticised her actions, but stated that she could not be held fully responsible for Millecam's fate.

The Dutch Federation Against Quacks (Nederlandse Vereniging tegen de Kwakzalverij) listed Jomanda at #15 on their top 20 list of quacks.

In October 2004, Jomanda drew publicity again by stating, in accordance with the ideas of Jozef Rulof, "cremation hurts".

== See also ==
- Arthur Ford
- Char Margolis
- Clever Hans
- Cold reading
- Forer effect
- Hot reading
- James Pike
- John Edward
- Jozef Rulof
- Mirin Dajo
- Peter Hurkos
- Peter Popoff
- Uri Geller
