= Ulysses Doubleday =

Ulysses Doubleday may refer to:

- Ulysses F. Doubleday, U.S. representative from New York
- Ulysses Doubleday (general), Union Army colonel during the American Civil War
