= Charles Kellogg (congressman) =

American politician

- Born: October 3, 1773; Sheffield, Berkshire County, Massachusetts
- Died: May 11, 1842 (aged 68); Ann Arbor, Washtenaw County, Michigan
- Occupations: Farmer, merchant, politician
- Known for: Member of the U.S. House of Representatives
- Predecessor: Rowland Day
- Successor: Nathaniel Garrow
- Spouse: Mary Ann Otis (m. 1794)
- Children: Eleven, including Day O. Kellogg

Charles Kellogg (October 3, 1773, in Sheffield, Berkshire County, Massachusetts – May 11, 1842, in Ann Arbor, Washtenaw County, Michigan) was an American farmer, merchant and politician from New York. From 1825 to 1827, he served one term in the U.S. House of Representatives.

== Life ==
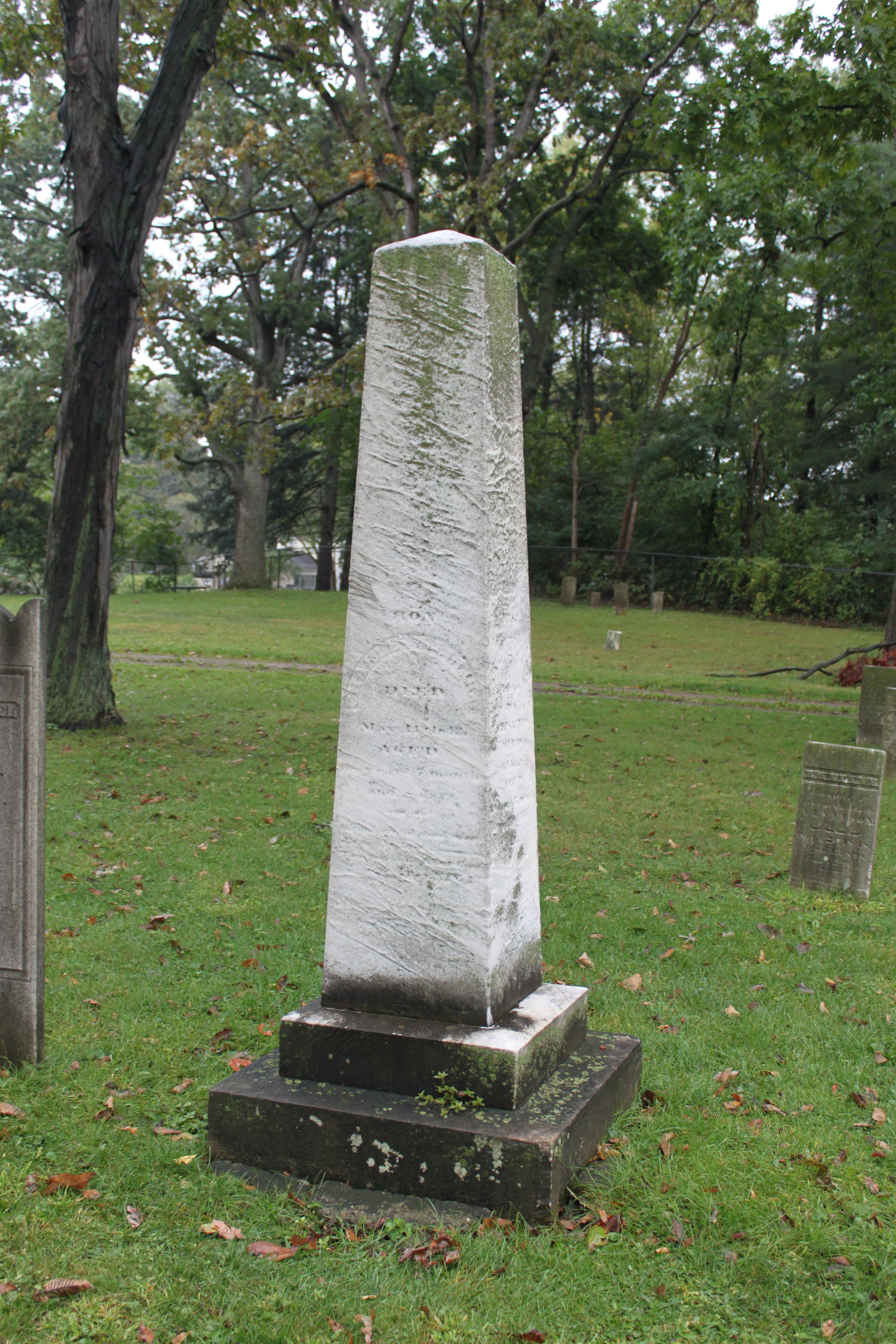
Kellogg grave

He was the son of Asa Kellogg (1745–1820) and Lucy (Powell) Kellogg (1746–1816). He attended the common schools. In 1787, he removed to Galway where his father had settled as a pioneer seven years before. On October 21, 1794, he married Mary Ann Otis (1774–1844), and they had eleven children, among them Day O. Kellogg (b. 1796; assemblyman 1839).

In 1796, the couple removed to Marcellus, in 1797 to Aurelius, and in 1799 to Sempronius. There they founded Kelloggsville, a hamlet situated in that part of Sempronius which was in 1833 split off to form the Town of Niles, and engaged in mercantile and agricultural pursuits.

=== Judicial career ===
He was an associate judge of the Cayuga County Court and a Justice of the Peace. He was a member of the New York State Assembly in 1808–09, 1810, 1820–21 and 1822. He was the first Postmaster of Kelloggsville, in office from 1814 to 1825. In 1823, he opened a gristmill in the neighboring hamlet of New Hope. The mill was sold in 1851.

=== Congress ===
Kellogg was elected as a Clintonian/Federalist to the 19th United States Congress, holding office from March 4, 1825, to March 3, 1827.

=== Later career and death ===
Afterwards, he resumed his agricultural pursuits.

In 1839, he removed to Ann Arbor, Michigan, died there three years later, and was buried at the Fairview Cemetery.

== Sources ==
- United States Congress. "Charles Kellogg (id: K000063)". Biographical Directory of the United States Congress.
- The New York Civil List compiled by Franklin Benjamin Hough (pages 71, 182f, 197f and 285; Weed, Parsons and Co., 1858)
- FAMILY MEETING OF KELLOGGS in New England Historical and Genealogical Register (1858; Vol. 12; pages 199ff)
- Funeral of the Rev. D. O. Kellogg, his grandson's obit in NYT on January 29, 1904
- Charles Kellogg at Family Tree Maker

U.S. House of Representatives
Preceded by Rowland Day	Member of the U.S. House of Representatives from New York's 24th congressional district 1825–1827	Succeeded by Nathaniel Garrow
