= Mary Cutting =

Mary Cutting may refer to:

- Mary Stewart Doubleday Cutting (1851–1924), American author
- Mary Stewart Cutting Jr. (1879–1928), her daughter, American author and suffragist
