= John Doubleday =

John Doubleday may refer to:

- John Doubleday (restorer) (about 1798 – 1856), British craftsperson and restorer
- John Doubleday (sculptor) (born 1947), British painter and sculptor
- John Gordon Doubleday (1920–1982), British diplomat

== See also ==
- Doubleday (surname)
- John Doebley, American geneticist
