= Steve Ward =

Steve, Steven or Stephen Ward may refer to:

== Sportsmen ==
- Steve Ward (boxer) (born c.1956), British pugilist, world's oldest
- Steven Ward (cricketer) (born 1958), English left-handed batsman
- Steven Ward (boxer) (born 1990), Irish professional boxer
- Stephen Ward (weightlifter) (born 1973), English gold medalist
- Stephen Ward (footballer) (born 1985), Irish left-back winger
- Steve Ward (ice hockey) (born 1986), Canadian defenceman

== Others ==
- Stephen Ward Doubleday (1845–1926), American banker
- Stephen Ward (1912–1963), British osteopath and artist, a central figure in the 1963 Profumo affair
  - Stephen Ward (musical), 2013 musical by Andrew Lloyd Webber based on above
- Stephen Ward Sears (born 1932), American Civil War historian
- Steve Ward (computer scientist), American professor and researcher since 1970s
- Steve Ward (businessman) (born 1955), American businessman, former CEO of Lenovo
- Steve Ward (Colorado legislator) (born c.1960), American politician
- Steve Ward, American songwriter and vocalist for Cherry Twister since 1993
- Steven Ward (TV personality) (born 1980), American host of Tough Love
- Steve Ward, American Tesla coil enthusiast who in 2007 designed zeusaphone
- Steven John Ward (born 1990), South African actor
