= Mirin (name) =

Mirin is both a given name and a surname. Notable people with the name include:

- Saint Mirin (c. 565–c. 620), Irish monk and missionary
- Mirin Dajo, pseudonym of the Dutch performer Arnold Gerrit Henskes (1912–1948)
- Nicolas Isimat-Mirin (born 1991), French football player

== Fictional characters ==
- Mirrin is a minor enemy foot soldier in X-Men Legends II: Rise of Apocalypse
