= Andrija Puharich =

American physician and medical and parapsychological researcher

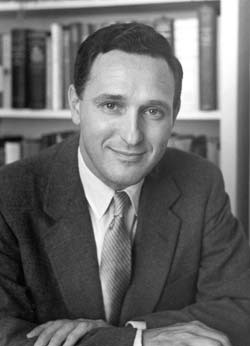
- Puharich in 1959
- Born: Henry Karel Puharić; February 19, 1918; Chicago, Illinois
- Died: January 3, 1995 (aged 76); Dobson, North Carolina
- Education: Philosophy/Pre-Med (1943); Doctor of Medicine (1947)
- Alma mater: Northwestern University
- Occupations: Inventor, Parapsychologist, Physician
- Spouse(s): Virginia "Jinny" Jackson Rebecca Alban Hoffberger (divorced); Bep Hermans

Andrija Puharich (February 19, 1918 – January 3, 1995) — born Henry Karel Puharić — was a medical and parapsychological researcher, medical inventor, physician and author, known as the person who brought Israeli Uri Geller (born 1946) and Dutch-born Peter Hurkos (1911–1988) to the United States for scientific investigation.

== Early life ==
Puharich was born in Chicago, Illinois, one of seven children born to Croatian immigrants. His father had emigrated from what was then the Austro-Hungarian Empire, entering the U.S. in 1912 as a stowaway. At home Karel's parents always called him "Andrija," which apparently wasn't his name at birth but just his parents' nickname for him. When Karel, as a young boy, started attending school, his parents enrolled him under the name "Henry Karl Puharich," feeling he would be more easily accepted with that name than with the foreign-sounding name "Karel Puharić." Thereafter he often signed his name as "Henry Karl Puharich." He didn't start using his nickname "Andrija" as his first name until sometime in the later part of his life.

During World War II, Puharich attended Northwestern University as a student in the Army Specialized Training Program. He earned an undergraduate degree in philosophy and pre-medicine in 1943 and received his M.D. from the Northwestern University School of Medicine in 1947. His residency was completed at the Permanente Research Foundation in Oakland, California, where he specialized in internal medicine.

== Career ==
From 1953 to 1955, Puharich served as a captain in the Army Medical Corps; in this capacity, he was assigned as Chief, Outpatient Service, U.S. Army Dispensary, Army Chemical Center, Edgewood Arsenal, Maryland. By this time he was already presenting papers on the possible military usefulness of paranormal phenemona.

During that time, he was in and out of Edgewood Arsenal Research Laboratories and Fort Detrick, inter-acting with various high-ranking members and officials primarily from The Pentagon, CIA, and Naval Intelligence. The Edgewood Arsenal is currently officially called the Edgewood Area of Aberdeen Proving Ground.

Puharich was impressed by the stories about the Dutch psychic Peter Hurkos and invited him to the U.S. in 1956 to investigate his alleged abilities (see below). In 1960, Puharich investigated materialization séances at Camp Chesterfield, but discovered the use of cheesecloth being used to fake ectoplasm.

In 1960, Puharich participated in Chatino rituals in Mexico, which involved the consumption of hallucinogenic drugs. These experiences resulted in the publication of his books The Sacred Mushroom and Beyond Telepathy.

In 1963, Puharich investigated the Brazilian psychic surgeon Zé Arigó, who he viewed favourably, providing an afterword for his 1974 biographer.

In 1971, Puharich met Israeli psychic Uri Geller and endorsed him as a genuine psychic (see below). Puharich wrote a supportive 1974 biography of Geller, a subject he had investigated with the help of Itzhak Bentov, among others.

In the 1970s, Puharich claimed he had investigated "the effects of a low frequency radiation beam" that the Soviet Union had been testing. According to Puharich the beam was based on the work of Nikola Tesla and could be used as a weapon to control people. He also claimed the beam was responsible for climatic disturbances, earthquakes, Legionnaires' disease and violent riots. Puharich wrote Tesla was contacted several times by extraterrestrials.

Two of the most famous of Puharich's 50-plus patents were devices that assist hearing: the "Means For Aiding Hearing" U.S. patent 2,995,633 and "Method And Apparatus For Improving Neural Performance In Human Subjects By Electrotherapy" U.S. patent 3,563,246". He was also granted a U.S. patent 4,394,230 in 1983 for a "Method and Apparatus for Splitting Water Molecules." His research included studying the influence of extremely low frequency ELF electromagnetic wave emissions on the mind, and he invented several devices allegedly blocking or converting ELF waves to prevent harm.

== Subjects investigated ==
=== Dhundiraj G. Vinod ===
In December, 1952, Puharich invited Hindu mystic Dhundiraj G. Vinod (1902—1969) to one of his channeling sessions. During the experiment Vinod went into a trance and claimed to have contacted a group of entities calling themselves "The Nine".

=== Peter Hurkos ===
Puharich was impressed by the stories about the Dutch psychic Peter Hurkos and invited him to the U.S. in 1956 to investigate his alleged abilities. Hurkos was studied at Puharich's Glen Cove, Maine, medical research laboratory under what Puharich considered to be controlled conditions. The results convinced Puharich that Hurkos had genuine psychic abilities. However the experiments were not repeated by other scientists. Puharich was described as a "credulous investigator." Raymond Buckland has written "with the exception of Dr. Andrija Puharich, not a single recognized psychic investigator has been impressed with Hurkos's performances."

=== Uri Geller ===
Puharich met Uri Geller in 1971 and endorsed him as a genuine psychic. Under hypnosis, Geller claimed he was sent to earth by extraterrestrials from a spaceship 53,000 light years away. Geller would later deny the space-fantasy claims, but affirmed there "is a slight possibility that some of my energies do have extraterrestrial connection."

In 1974, Puharich claimed he had observed Geller transmute base metal into gold by psychic power. Puharich also stated that Geller teleported a dog through the walls of his house. Martin Gardner wrote as "no expert on fraud was there as an observer" then nobody should take the claim of Puharich seriously. His paranormal claims about Geller were criticized by the psychologist David Marks.

In his biography of Geller, Uri: A Journal of the Mystery of Uri Geller (1974) Puharich claimed that with Geller he had communicated with super intelligent computers from outer space. According to Puharich the computers sent messages to warn humanity that a disaster is likely to occur if humans do not change their ways. Puharich claimed that extraterrestrial beings had communicated to him that Geller was the chosen savior of humanity and had been given the ability to contact flying saucers and perform paranormal phenomena such as psychokinesis, spoon bending, telepathy and teleportation. He also claimed to have experienced poltergeist phenomena with Geller.

The psychologist Christopher Evans who reviewed the book in the New Scientist, wrote that although Puharich believed in every word he had written, the book was credulous and "those fans of Geller's who might have hoped to have used the book as ammunition to impress the sceptics. They will be the most disappointed of all". James Randi has written the biography contained "silly theories" but was "both a boost and a millstone to Geller".

=== Greta Woodrew ===
Puharich is said to have conducted some form of hypnosis with Greta Woodrew at Lab Nine on his estate in Ossining, New York. It was through these sessions that Woodrew allegedly made psychic contact with extraterrestrial beings.

== Personal life ==
While working in Mexico, Puharich married Rebecca Alban Hoffberger, the future founder and director of the American Visionary Art Museum; they later divorced.

== Publications ==
- Effects of Tesla's Life and Electrical Inventions (essay on Nikola Tesla)
- The Sacred Mushroom: Key to the Door of Eternity (1959)
- Beyond Telepathy (1973), intro. by Ira Einhorn. 3rd ed. intro. by Mitch Horowitz.
- Uri: A Journal of the Mystery of Uri Geller (1974). Anchor Press / Doubleday.
- The Iceland Papers: Select Papers on Experimental and Theoretical Research on the Physics of Consciousness, ed. (1979). Foreword by physicist Brian D. Josephson.
- Tesla's Magnifying Transmitter: How to Protect Yourself from Omnipresent Electromagnetic Pollution (monograph) (1985). original.
- ELF Magnetic Model of Matter and Mind; the Origin of Life; & the Art of Healing (Feb. 1987). Essentia Research Associates / ELF Cocoon Corporation.
- Origin of Life Experiments (monograph), ed. by Thomas Valone, Ph.D. (2008). Integrity Research Institute.

== In popular culture ==
Puharich appeared as himself in "The Case of the Meddling Medium" episode of the Perry Mason TV series (season 5, episode 6, first broadcast October 22, 1961). He is shown to be the Director of the "Parapsychology Laboratory", and is described as "one of the top ESP men in the country". In the episode, he sets up an experiment using a Faraday cage in an attempt to demonstrate the extrasensory perception (ESP) abilities of Mason's client. If she has ESP, it implies that the trance she went into on the night of the murder, during which she produced automatic writing, may have been real.
