= Mary Stewart Doubleday Cutting =

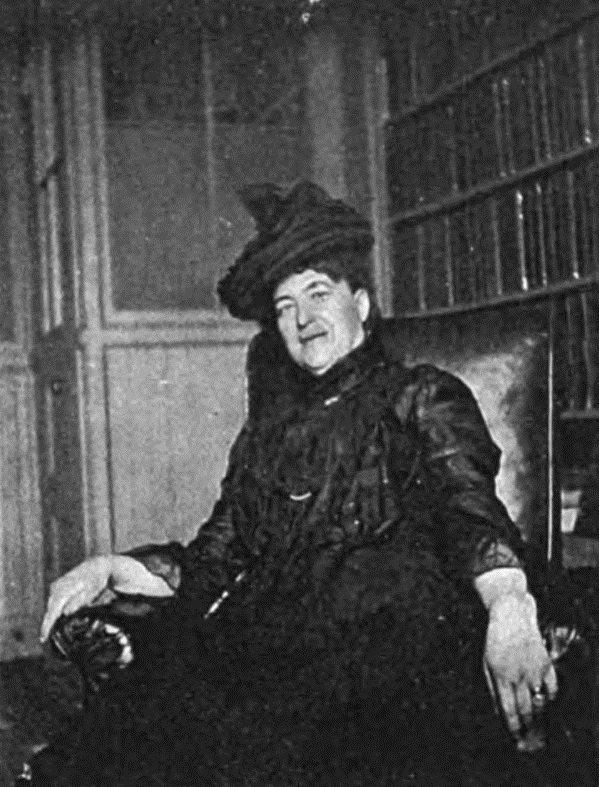
Portrait of Mary Stewart Cutting from The Bookman, 1902

Mary Stewart Doubleday Cutting (1851–1924) was an author of domestic realism novels and short stories.

== Personal life ==
Mary Stewart Doubleday Cutting was the daughter of Civil War Brevet Brigadier General Ulysses Doubleday and his wife, née Mary Stewart. She was the granddaughter of Ulysses F. Doubleday, who served in the War of 1812 and was elected to both the Twenty-second and Twenty-fourth Congresses. She was the niece of General Abner Doubleday.

In 1875, Mary Stewart Doubleday married Charles Weed Cutting, described as a "well-known stationer", who died in 1893. They had five children—a son, Charles Weed Cutting, Jr., who died in Mexico City in 1920; a daughter Janet (Brevoort), who died in 1917; a son, Ulysses D. Cutting; a daughter, Amy; and a daughter, Mary Stewart Cutting, Jr. One other child may have died between 1893 and 1918, as Charles' obituary mentions six surviving children, but Scannell's New Jersey's First Citizens (Vol. I 1917-1918 lists five children. Mary Stewart Cutting, Jr.'s obituary only references Amy and Ulysses D. as siblings.

Mary's father, Ulysses Doubleday, died on or near the same day as her husband but in Tryon, NC.

At the time of her death, she was living in Orange, New Jersey.

Her daughter, Mary Stewart Cutting Jr., who died in 1928, wrote for The New York Times and was a prominent suffragist.

== Novels and Short Stories ==
While Mary Stewart (Doubleday) Cutting was presenting her work publicly as early as 1872, when a poem of hers was published in Lippincott's Monthly Magazine, she only began publishing professionally in earnest after her husband's death in 1893. A list of Mary Stewart Doubleday Cutting's books published between 1902 and 1920, can be found at the Online Books Page hosted by the University of Pennsylvania. She published under the name Mary Stewart Cutting; listings today often include her maiden name of Doubleday to distinguish her work from that of her daughter, also Mary Stewart Cutting (Jr.).

Her works fall under the general classification of domestic realism, a type of fiction popular with women in the late nineteenth and early twentieth centuries. Some of Cutting's work focuses on navigating courtship and marriage, while other of her work, coming at the very end of the nineteenth century and throughout the first two decades of the twentieth century, reflects more of a societal shift in how women were beginning to assert, in particular, financial capability and independence.

In Heart of Lynn (1904), for instance, the heroine is a single woman living at home, whose family has been unexpectedly thrust into poverty. She and one sister attempt to find work illustrating and writing, but are unsuccessful. In making cold calls, however, they find an employer who has a job for their younger brother, which is enough to sustain them for the time being but not enough for them to move from the impoverished area in which they are living. The heroine begins a home-based candy-making business and the reader follows her through the process of ordering supplies, producing large batches of candy, filling orders, and keeping accounts. Ultimately, her business fails because some of the candy becomes stale—supply and demand not quite synched in time—and the family is saved by means more in keeping with domestic realism fiction of the time: A piece of property the family owns finally sells for a hefty sum.

=== The Whole Family: A Novel by Twelve Authors ===
In 1906, William Dean Howells conceived a literary experiment involving several authors each contributing one chapter to a novel about a family. Overseen by Harper's Bazaar editor Elizabeth Jordan, The Whole Family:A Novel by Twelve Authors was serialized in the magazine before being published in 1908. In 2001, Duke University Press reissued the novel, calling it "[o]ne of the most fascinating experiments in American literature..." (Cover description). Mary Stewart (Doubleday) Cutting contributed the fourth chapter, 'The Daughter-in-Law'; writer Henry James contributed the seventh chapter, 'The Married Son.' Howells and Jordan each contributed a chapter, as well. June Howard's study of The Whole Family discusses the themes of Cutting's chapter in relation to her other work.

Susanna Ashton, writing in the Spring 2001, issue of Studies in the Novel, noted that the project raised issues of how authors of varying reputations ought to be compensated for their work on a joint project. The authors were paid a flat fee for the serial publications, and royalties on book sales became the property of Harper's Bazaar. Cutting—in some places Ashton refers to her as Mary Stuart Cutting—was paid much less than some of the authors but more than Howells, whose contribution was considered part of his salaried employment for the magazine. Ashton, in describing the correspondence between Cutting and Jordan regarding payment for Cutting's contribution, noted that it "describes the manner in which a relatively minor writer of the period sought to control the recompense accorded her work. Even more significantly, Cutting addresses the issue of collaborative composition, what kind of labor collaboration entails, and how it differs from and yet draws upon her previous experience" (61-62). Cutting argued that she should be paid more than the $300 offered because creating a single chapter within an already established storyline required more labor than had she come up with the entire idea on her own and because she would have to work harder at making her chapter complement those of other, more established authors.
