= Peter Hurkos =

Dutch ESP medium (1911–1988)

- Born: Pieter van der Hurk; 21 May 1911; Dordrecht, Netherlands
- Died: 1 June 1988 (aged 77); Los Angeles, California, United States
- Occupation: Psychic medium

Pieter van der Hurk (21 May 1911 – 1 June 1988) known as Peter Hurkos, was a Dutchman who claimed he manifested extrasensory perception (ESP) after recovering from a head injury and coma caused by a fall from a ladder when aged 30. He went to the United States in 1956 for psychic experiments, later becoming a professional psychic who sought clues in the Manson Family murders and the Boston Strangler case. With the help of businessman Henry Belk and parapsychologist Andrija Puharich, Hurkos became a popular entertainer known for performing psychic feats before live and television audiences.

== Testing and analysis ==
Hurkos stated in a 1960 episode of the television series One Step Beyond, after giving a lecture at Massachusetts Institute of Technology to a scientific panel, that he would participate in any scientific experiment under any circumstances. However, author and stage magician James Randi contended that Hurkos refused to allow his skill to be tested by scientists except for one session with the parapsychologist Charles Tart of the University of California, Davis. Dr. Tart's tests were negative. Randi commented "If Tart can't find such powers, they certainly aren't there!".

The parapsychologist Andrija Puharich was impressed by the stories about Hurkos and invited him to the USA in 1956 to investigate his alleged psychic abilities. Hurkos was studied at Puharich's Glen Cove, Maine, medical research laboratory under what Dr. Puharich considered to be controlled conditions. The results convinced Puharich that Hurkos had genuine psychic abilities. However the experiments were not repeated by other scientists and Puharich was described as a "credulous investigator". Raymond Buckland has written "with the exception of Dr. Andrija Puharich, not a single recognized psychic investigator has been impressed with Hurkos's performances."

During his early career as a psychic entertainer, Hurkos purported that he employed his psychic powers to discern details of audience members' private lives that he could not otherwise have known. However, the psychologist Ronald Schwartz wrote in the magazine Skeptical Inquirer that Hurkos used cold reading methods and published a transcription of such a reading in their autumn 1978 issue.

Hurkos: I see an operation.
Subject: [no response].
Hurkos: Long time ago.
Subject: No. We have been lucky.
Hurkos: [somewhat angrily] Think! When you were a little girl. I see worried parents, and doctor, and scurrying about.
Subject: [no response]
Hurkos: [confidently] Long time ago.
Subject: [yielding] I cannot remember for certain. Maybe you are right. I'm not sure.

James Randi analyzed this and other transcripts of Hurkos performances and professed to have identified a number of standard cold reading techniques. For example, Hurkos might begin with something seemingly personal but actually quite common: a surgery. Hurkos would not specify that the subject underwent surgery—it could be any recent surgery of personal relevance to the subject. If this method failed, Randi maintained, Hurkos would qualify the statement with the phrase "long time ago." At this point, any operation to any family member or friend in the subjects's own life would have seemed psychic because an operation is thought of as a private matter. Randi added that the tone in Hurkos's voice was also significant: Hurkos presented himself as confident and knowing and characterized the subject as obstinate.

Other common techniques included guessing numbers of people in families (easy enough if one picks a typical number and allows himself to add frequent visitors or exclude family members who have relocated away from home as needed to match the target, as Hurkos did), including nonsense words in his presentation that could be interpreted by the subject to have any one of many meanings, and guessing on the importance of common names, which could be permutated as needed. (He most commonly used the name "Ann," which would give him a success with anybody who had a relative or friend or teacher or boss or co-worker named Ann, Anna, Anastasia, etc., at any time in his or her life.)

== Refuted claims ==
Hurkos and his supporters maintained that he was a great psychic detective. In 1964, Attorney General Edward W. Brooke of Massachusetts said Hurkos had come ''uncannily close'' to describing the person suspected in the Boston Strangler case. By 1969, he cited the successful solution of 27 murder cases in 17 countries. However, in some cases the detectives assigned to these cases countered that Hurkos contributed no information unobtainable from newspapers and, in some cases, that he had no part in the investigations whatsoever. In response to Hurkos's claim that he located the stolen "Stone of Scone," Home Secretary Chuter Ede declared:

The gentleman in question whose activities have been publicized (though not by the police) was among a number of persons authorized to come to Westminster Abbey to examine the scene of the crime. He was not invited by the police, his expenses have not been refunded by the Government, and he did not obtain any result whatsoever.

Hurkos made notable claims contrary to popular belief such as the claim that Adolf Hitler was alive and living in Argentina.

In 1964, Hurkos was put on trial on the charge of impersonating a federal agent, found guilty, and fined $1,000. Hurkos posed as the police officer in order to gather information that he could later claim to be psychic revelations.

In the case of murderer John Norman Collins, he sometimes claimed the killer was blond and at other times brown-haired so that he could claim victory either way. He claimed to have identified Charles Manson to police; Manson was also identified by his devotee Susan Atkins to a cellmate while she was in jail for a different crime. In fact, Hurkos had been to the Tate residence to do a "reading," but his guesses, including descriptions of how the "killings erupted during a black magic ritual known as 'goona goona,'" were inaccurate.

The magician Milbourne Christopher in his book Mediums, Mystics and the Occult documented the errors Hurkos had made.

Authors Arthur Lyons and Marcello Truzzi PhD, also a founder of the International Remote Viewing Association, wrote the Hurkos cases were "pure bunk" in their 1991 book The Blue Sense: Psychic Detectives and Crime.

== Popularization ==
Despite refutations, Hurkos remained famous. There have been several television specials about him, including:

- Japan: The Greatest Psychic in The World ... Peter Hurkos, a six-hour two-part special on TV-TOKYO and NET-TV filmed at Dr. Puharich's lab in Dobson, North Carolina, where Hurkos was specifically tested for this special, and also on location in Japan. He befriended children's TV producer Seichi Nishino of studio Knack, and became the inspiration of Chargeman Ken.
- He appeared three times on The Tonight Show Starring Johnny Carson.
- In 1960 his story was told by the television program Alcoa Presents: One Step Beyond as "The Peter Hurkos Story: Parts 1 and 2". The show starred actor Albert Salmi as Peter Hurkos. At the conclusion of the program Peter Hurkos himself was interviewed by host John Newland.
- A story about Hurkos' alleged psychic powers entitled "The Man with the X-Ray Mind" appears in Frank Edwards' 1959 book Stranger Than Science (Citadel)
- Gold Keys Boris Karloff Thriller issue 2 (January 1963) profiles Hurkos in "The Amazing Peter Hurkos".
- Hurkos is mentioned in the 1979 Stephen King novel The Dead Zone. The novel seems to imply that Hurkos actually did have psychic powers.

== See also ==
- Mirin Dajo
- John Edward
- Clever Hans
- Arthur Ford
- Forer effect
- Uri Geller
- Hot reading
- Jomanda
- Char Margolis
- James Pike
- James Randi

== Sources ==
- Randi, James (n.d.) [1995 (print)]. "Hurkos, Peter". An Encyclopedia of Claims, Frauds, and Hoaxes of the Occult and Supernatural. Digital adaptation by Gilles-Maurice de Schryver. (Online ed.). James Randi Educational Foundation [St. Martin's Press (print)].
- Randi, James. Flim-Flam! Psychics, ESP, Unicorns, and other Delusions. Prometheus Books, 1982: pp. 270–272.
- Ramsland, Katherine. "Chapter 6: Enter the Psychic." John Norman Collins: The Co-Ed Killer.
- Christopher, Milbourne. Peter Hurkos – Psychic Sleuth in Mediums, Mystics and the Occult. Thomas Y. Crowell, 1975: pp. 66–76.
