= Doubleday =

Doubleday may refer to:

- Doubleday (surname), including a list of people with the name

== Publishing imprints ==
- Doubleday (publisher), imprint of Knopf Doubleday, a subsidiary of Penguin Random House
- Doubleday Canada, imprint of Penguin Random House Canada
- Image, formerly Doubleday Religion, imprint of Crown Publishing Group, a subsidiary of Penguin Random House

== Baseball ==
- Doubleday Field, Cooperstown, New York, USA; baseball stadium
- Doubleday Field, United States Military Academy, West Point, New York State, USA; a region of the academy; see Johnson Stadium at Doubleday Field
- Auburn Doubledays, single-A baseball team, from Auburn, New York State, USA

== Other uses ==
- SS Abner Doubleday, Liberty ship built during World War II
- Henry Doubleday Research Association, UK organic growing charity

== See also ==
- Doubleday myth about the creation of baseball by Abner Doubleday
