= Allen and James Thompson =

Allen Thompson
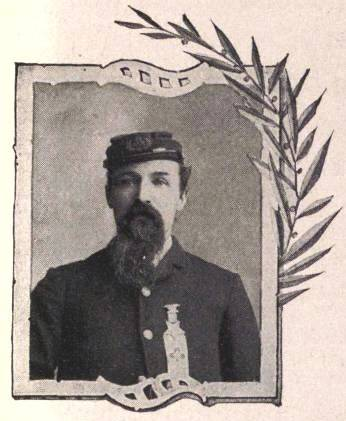
- Allen Thompson, Medal of Honor recipient
- Born: October 1, 1847; Sandy Creek, New York, US
- Died: February 27, 1906 (aged 58)
- Military career
- Allegiance: United States; Union
- Branch: United States Army; Union Army
- Service years: 1863–1865
- Rank: Private
- Unit: 4th New York Heavy Artillery Regiment
- Conflicts: American Civil War
- Awards: Medal of Honor

James G. Thompson
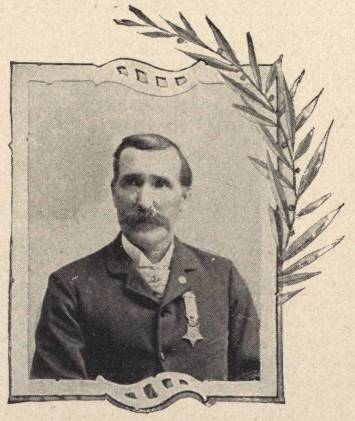
- James G. Thompson, Medal of Honor recipient
- Born: December 25, 1849; Sandy Creek, New York, US
- Died: May 23, 1921 (aged 71); San Diego County, California, US
- Military career
- Allegiance: United States; Union
- Branch: United States Army; Union Army
- Service years: 1864–1865
- Rank: Private
- Unit: 4th New York Heavy Artillery Regiment
- Conflicts: American Civil War
- Awards: Medal of Honor

Brothers Allen Thompson (October 1, 1847 – February 27, 1906) and James Granville Thompson (December 25, 1849 – May 23, 1921) were Union Army soldiers during the American Civil War and recipients of the highest decoration of the United States military, the Medal of Honor. They are one of only a few pairs of brothers to have received the medal.

== Biography ==
Both brothers enlisted as privates in the 4th New York Heavy Artillery Regiment; Allen joined from Port Jarvis, New York in June 1863, and was assigned to Company I, while James joined from Sandy Creek, New York in February 1864, and was assigned to Company K; both brothers claimed to be 18 years old at the time of their enlistments. Allen mustered out with the regiment in September 1865. James, who was wounded 2 days after their MOH actions, was discharged the following month.

During the Appomattox Campaign of March and April, 1865, their regiment served as infantry rather than artillery and was attached to a brigade in the 1st Division, II Corps, under division commander General Nelson A. Miles.

On April 2, 1865, the Thompsons' brigade was pursuing Confederate forces outside of Petersburg, Virginia, following the Union victory at Five Forks the previous day. Upon coming across seemingly deserted enemy fortifications at White Oak Road and fearing an ambush, General Miles called for volunteers to reconnoiter the area. Seven men, including both Thompson brothers, stepped forward. Miles instructed them to advance through the trees to a designated spot in the distance and, once there, to signal back that the way was clear. If they encountered Confederate soldiers, they were to alert the brigade of the enemy's presence by opening fire immediately. The seven men advanced through the trees and were approximately one-fourth of the way to the designated spot when they were surprised by a group of about 50 Confederate soldiers. Ordered to lay down their guns and surrender, the Union men instead chose to fire, even though they were less than 100 feet from the numerically superior enemy force. James Thompson explained:

We had the secret of a signal that would have drawn that brigade of brave boys in our rear into this death-trap, where the enemy could have shot them down at their leisure. We knew very well that if we surrendered without giving the alarm we would be compelled to give up the signal or die, so we decided our only course was to give the alarm and die where we were.

Five of the group of seven were killed by the Confederate return fire, only the Thompson brothers survived. Allen Thompson retreated back to the Union lines, uninjured, while James Thompson lay severely wounded. Alerted by the rifle fire, the Union forces commenced an attack; the Thompsons' brigade held its position while the 2nd Division flanked and routed the enemy force. A burial detail sent to inter the dead of the small reconnaissance party found James Thompson still alive.

Thirty-one years after the battle, on April 22, 1896, Allen and James Thompson were each issued the Medal of Honor for their actions at White Oak Road. The Thompsons' official Medal of Honor citations are nearly identical; James' citation reads:

Made a hazardous reconnaissance through timber and slashings, preceding the Union line of battle, signaling the troops and leading them through the obstructions.

Allen Thompson died at age 58 and was buried in Lakeview Cemetery, Cheyenne, Wyoming. James Thompson died fifteen years later at age 71 and was buried in Mount Hope Cemetery, San Diego, California.

== Medal of Honor citation ==
=== Allen Thompson ===
Rank and organization: Private, Company I, 4th New York Heavy Artillery. Place and date: At White Oak Road, Va., April 1, 1865. Entered service at: Port Jarvis, N.Y. Birth: New York, N.Y. Date of issue: April 22, 1896.

Citation:

Made a hazardous reconnaissance through timber and slashings preceding the Union line of battle, signaling the troops and leading them through the obstruction.

=== James Thompson ===
Rank and organization: Private, Company K, 4th New York Heavy Artillery. Place and date: At White Oak Road, Va., April 1, 1865. Entered service at: Sandy Creek, N.Y. Birth: Sandy Creek, N.Y. Date of issue: April 22, 1896.

Citation:

Made a hazardous reconnaissance through timber and slashings, preceding the Union line of battle, signaling the troops and leading them through the obstructions.

== See also ==
- List of American Civil War Medal of Honor recipients: T–Z
