= Greta Woodrew =

American author, psychic and healer (1929–2010)

- Born: December 16, 1929
- Died: September 1, 2010 (aged 80)
- Resting place: Greensboro Hebrew Cemetery, Greensboro, Guilford County, North Carolina, USA

Greta Andron Woodrew Smolowe (December 16, 1929 – September 1, 2010) was an author, psychic and healer, and purported contactee of extraterrestrial beings. Her books, On a Slide of Light and Memories of Tomorrow, and newsletter, The Woodrew Update, addressed her purported alien encounters, while her foundation, the Space Technology and Research Foundation (STAR), was established to carry out philanthropic work, including broadcasting messages she received from alien life; Woodrew would later become a donor to philanthropic organizations like Conservation International and the Sierra Club Foundation. Woodrew also published a children's book in her lifetime entitled Hear the Colors! See the Music!: A Tomorrow Book for Today. Some of her papers are held in the Department of Special Collections and University Archives at Stanford University.

== Personal life ==
Woodrew was married to Richard E. "Dick" Smolowe. They had four children together, Allan, Jonathan, Jill, and Ann. Woodrew was the granddaughter of Alexander Schlang and Blanche Cohen-Schlang-Nirenstein, the latter of whom was deeply involved in social and charity work in New York. Woodrew was the great-granddaughter of David and Wilhemina Cohen, the former of whom was a founder and funder of the Eldridge Street Synagogue in New York City.

== Education ==
Woodrew attended the University of Florida, graduating with honors and a B.A. in 1951. She was the first woman to graduate from the university's four-year program and to receive the Phi Beta Kappa Achievement Award and Dr. Allen's Award for Excellence. In 1979, William Penn College granted Woodrew an honorary Doctor of Laws degree.

== Contact with extraterrestrials ==
Woodrew claimed to first come into contact with "extraterrestrial intelligences" in 1976. In her 1981 book On A Slide of Light, she described her encounters as taking place initially "under laboratory conditions with a leading medical doctor and scientist." It was her "impression that once [she] left the lab, [she] would also leave [the extraterrestrial intelligences] behind, but this was not to be the case. Once [she] exercised [her] free will in allowing extraterrestrials into [her] life, they quickly became a regular part of [her] experienced reality. [She] could be sitting at [her] desk at, say, 10 a.m., getting ready to phone a client about a prospect, [she] dialed the number and once again glanced at the clock, and to her confusion, it would read 10:45..."(The Saucer Life podcast; March 18, 2020 episode; 7:10)

Woodrew attributed these time discrepancies to a "continuing dialogue with extraterrestrial intelligences transcending time and space and the third dimension." (The Saucer Life podcast; March 18, 2020 episode; 7:54) The beings with which Woodrew claimed she had contact with were supposedly from another solar system located astronomically on the Messier list at M-92. The place of origin, Woodrew claimed, was called Ogatta, "part of a binary, or twin star, system, which comprises what they call a jorpa, and we call a solar system, of five planets in another galaxy." Woodrew claimed the five planets were called Ogatta, Arshan, Arka, Mennon, and Tchowvie. (The Saucer Life podcast; March 18, 2020 episode; 8:26)

The "leading medical doctor and scientist" through whom Woodrew had initial extraterrestrial contact was doctor, medical inventor, and medical and parapsychological researcher Andrija Puharich. The experiments the two undertook, leading to Woodrew's alien contacts, took place at what Puharich called Lab Nine on his estate in Ossining, New York.

During her lifetime, Woodrew also had contact with author and psychical researcher Harold Morrow Sherman; she and husband Dick Smolowe visited Sherman at least once at his home, Ark Haven, in Arkansas.

== Healing abilities ==
Woodrew claimed to be a healer, with extraterrestrials' healing abilities channeled through her. One such instance of healing was for ballerina Virginia Rich Barnett for whom Woodrew, "in minutes, cured [...] of a knee injury so severe doctors told her she would never even exercise again, let alone dance."

== The Woodrew Update ==
Woodrew and husband Dick Smolowe began their newsletter, The Woodrew Update, in 1980. They continued publishing it until 1997. The publication was national and international, with subscribers from across the United States, Canada, and 14 other countries.

== Legacy ==
The University of Florida offers the Dr. Greta Andron Smolowe Scholarship; she also holds a place in the university's Hall of Fame as First Lady of Student Body Dramatics, Service and Leadership. In addition, the American Biographical Institute honored her for International Contribution to the World of Psi.

Woodrew's North Carolina compound, the home base of her STAR Foundation, became home to Save the Animals Rescue. Additionally, her life and career were covered in the March 18, 2020 episode of podcast The Saucer Life. Her books are still in circulation. Woodrew's son, Alan, went on to earn an MBA from Lehigh University, a PhD from the University of Orlando, and an Ed.D. from Barry University. Son Jonathan and daughter Jill attended Princeton, and daughter Ann graduated from Dartmouth. Jill became a journalist, holding the post of foreign affairs writer for Time and Newsweek. She also served as a senior writer for People and published two books, Four Funerals and a Wedding: Resilience in a Time of Grief and An Empty Lap: One Couple’s Journey to Parenthood.

== Bibliography ==
- Hear the Colors! See the Music! A Tomorrow Book for Today (1992), Dublan Press
- Memories of Tomorrow (1988), Doubleday
- On A Slide of Light (1981), MacMillan Publishers
