= Stephen Ward Doubleday =

Stephen Ward Doubleday (January 6, 1845 – September 27, 1926) was an American banker.

== Biography ==
=== Early life and education ===
Stephen Ward Doubleday was born January 6, 1845 to Mary Augusta Ward and Colonel Thomas D. Doubleday. He was a nephew of General Abner Doubleday and grandson of Jacksonian Congressman and newspaper publisher Ulysses F. Doubleday. Stephen was named after Stephen Ward, patriot of the Revolutionary War, who attended the provincial congress, was a presidential elector, a Westchester county judge, and was elected to congress.

Doubleday enlisted in the Civil War at 17, was mustered in as a second lieutenant and served with the 4th New York Heavy Artillery.

=== Career ===
An investment banker, Doubleday was a senior partner of Miller & Doubleday, where he began working in 1888; later he was a partner of Noble, Mestre & Doubleday. He served as Governor of the New York Stock Exchange in 1898–1899.

He traveled and lived abroad from 1900 to 1912 in Monaco and Berlin and was an avid golfer. He won golf tournaments in Berlin, Germany (1911) and Cannes, France (organized by the Czar's brother Grand Duke Michael)(1901). Doubleday was a member of the Apawamis Golf Club, the New York Stock Exchange, and the Union League Club of New York.

=== Marriage and children ===
Doubleday married Angelica Barraclough Cushman, daughter of Don Alonzo Cushman, in 1875. The couple had three children and the family lived in Manhattan and Rye, New York. He was widowed by Angelica's death on March 6, 1915. His daughter Angelica Cushman Doubleday Tropp and her husband Simeon became the principal financial backers of Wilhelm Reich during his years in America.

=== Death and funeral ===
Stephen Ward Doubleday died following a stroke on September 27, 1926. His funeral was held September 29, 1926 at the Church of the Transfiguration.
