= The Whole Family =

1908 collaborative novel

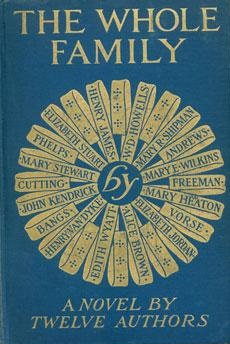
- First edition
- Author: Various
- Language: English
- Publisher: Harper & Brothers
- Publication date: October 15, 1908
- Publication place: United States
- Media type: Print (Serial)
- Pages: 317 pp

The Whole Family: a Novel by Twelve Authors (1908) is a collaborative novel told in twelve chapters, each by a different author. This unusual project was conceived by novelist William Dean Howells and carried out under the direction of Harper's Bazaar editor Elizabeth Jordan, who (like Howells) also wrote one of the chapters.

Howells's idea for the novel was to show how an engagement or marriage would affect and be affected by an entire family. The project became somewhat curious for the way the authors' contentious interrelationships mirrored the sometimes dysfunctional family they described in their chapters.

Other than Howells himself, Henry James was probably the best-known author to contribute. Howells had been unable to persuade Mark Twain to join the project.The novel was serialized in Harper's Bazaar in 1907–08 and published as a book by Harper's in late 1908.

The novel features a middle-class family of New England who are active in the silverplate industry. Their college-educated daughter returns home with an unsuitable fiancé, setting in motion the events of the novel. By its end, she has instead married a college professor. The couple sail to Europe for their honeymoon.

== Chapters and authors ==
1. The Father by William Dean Howells
2. The Old-Maid Aunt by Mary E. Wilkins Freeman
3. The Grandmother by Mary Heaton Vorse
4. The Daughter-in-Law by Mary Stewart Cutting
5. The School-Girl by Elizabeth Jordan
6. The Son-in-Law by John Kendrick Bangs
7. The Married Son by Henry James
8. The Married Daughter by Elizabeth Stuart Phelps Ward
9. The Mother by Edith Wyatt
10. The School-Boy by Mary Raymond Shipman Andrews
11. Peggy by Alice Brown
12. The Friend of the Family by Henry van Dyke

The highest paid of the contributors was Ward, who asked for $750. Van Dyke was paid $600, Brown $500, James $400, Cutting $350, Freeman $250, and Howells contributed without additional payment.

== Plot summary ==
In the opening chapter Howells introduces the Talbert family, middle-class New England proprietors of a silverplate works that turns out ice-pitchers and other mundane household items. Daughter Peggy Talbert has just returned from her coeducational college. She is engaged to a harmless but rather weak young man named Harry Goward.

Eventually, after many twists and turns introduced by the subsequent contributors, Harry Goward is dismissed as a suitor, Aunt Elizabeth is sent off to New York City, and a more suitable match for Peggy is found in a college professor named Stillman Dane. Peggy marries Dane and the couple sails off to Europe with Peggy's brother Charles and his wife Lorraine for a honeymoon tour.

== Composition and publication history ==
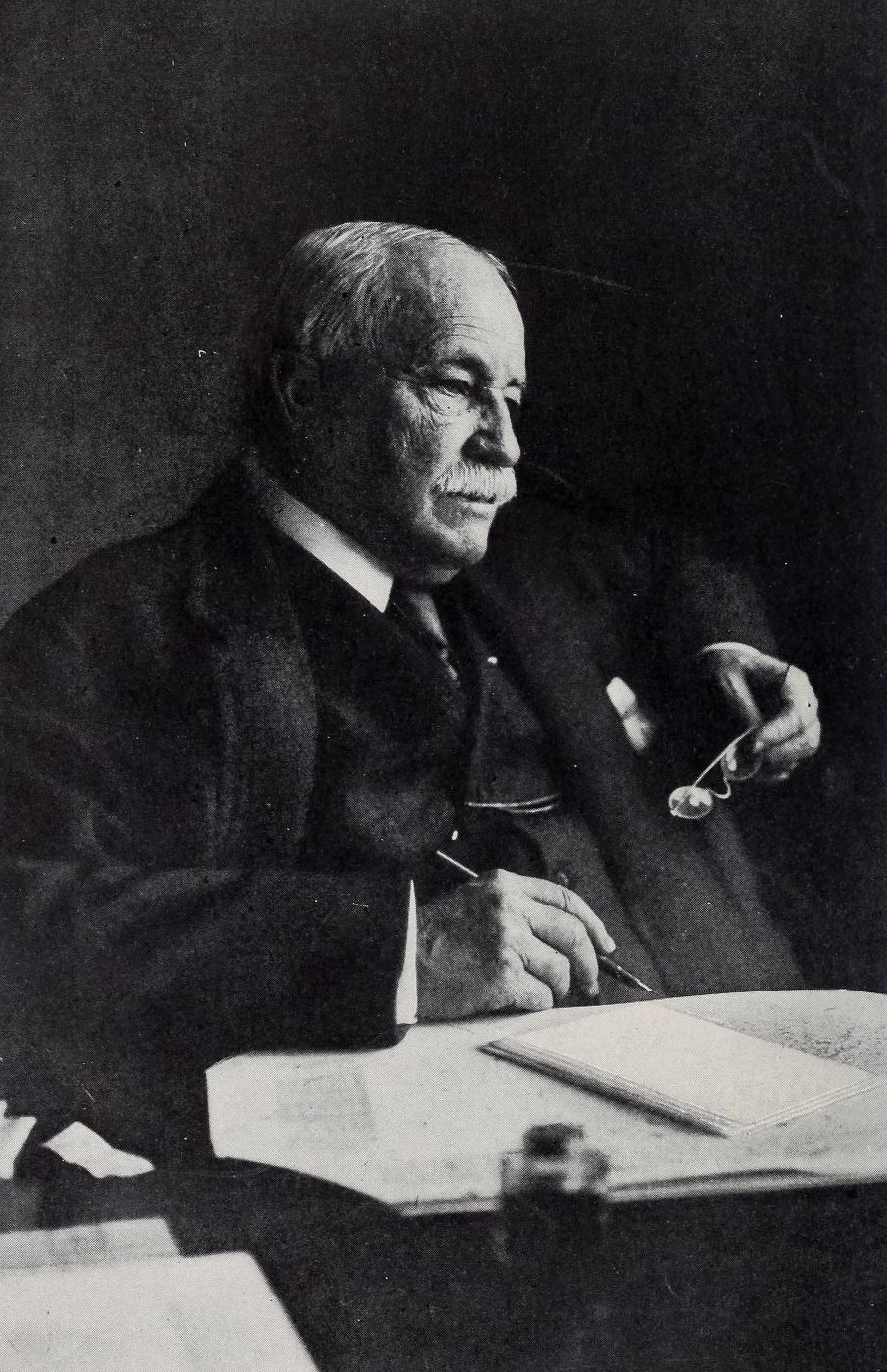
William Dean Howells thought of the collaborative project in the spring of 1906.

William Dean Howells conceived of the project in the spring of 1906 as a showpiece of his brand of literary realism. He enlisted the help of Elizabeth Jordan, then editor of Harper's Bazar, and pitched the book as an opportunity to create "a showplace for Harper's family of authors". Jordan was excited and hoped "to bring together the greatest, grandest, most gorgeous group of authors ever collaborating on a literary production". Mark Twain may have inspired the collaboration after previously suggesting a similar project involving himself, Thomas Bailey Aldrich, Bret Harte, and others, though the idea was dismissed. For The Whole Family, Twain was offered the light-hearted school-boy chapter but declined.

Howells was concerned about which writers would contribute, especially if he intended to contribute a chapter himself. As he wrote to Jordan, "If you find the scheme does not commend itself to the more judicious and able among the writers to whom you propose it, you had better drop it. I should not like to appear in co-operation with young or unimportant writers." Jordan set about finding contributors, though only half of those approached agreed to the project. Howells had predicted that neither Edith Wharton nor Henry James would be willing, though James ultimately did contribute. James, in fact, was immediately impressed with the idea and wrote to Jordan he was interested in writing any of several characters' chapters. Hamlin Garland declined to take part and Kate Douglas Wiggin withdrew after initially agreeing.

It was Howells's intention that each of the authors would examine the impact of Peggy's engagement on a different member of the Talbert family. The second chapter, by Mary E. Wilkins Freeman, immediately disrupted Howells's intended trajectory. Freeman apparently took issue with Howells's reference to the old maid aunt as a quiet old spinster and transformed her from a minor character to be pitied into a major one to be envied. Her character, Aunt Elizabeth or "Lily", is a vibrant and sexually attractive woman who does not mind getting noticed by Peggy's fiancé.

Jordan, herself unmarried, was impressed by Freeman's character and, as she called it, the "explosion of a bombshell on our literary hearthstone", but she dealt with considerable negative response from some of the other collaborators, particularly Howells and van Dyke. Howells, never particularly comfortable with frank sexuality, recoiled from Freeman's spicy conception of a character he had intended as a harmless old lady. Van Dyke, who would eventually write the concluding chapter, reacted in a half-humorous, half-worried letter to Jordan:

Heavens! What a catastrophe! Who would have thought that the old maiden aunt would go mad in the second chapter? Poor lady. Red hair and a pink hat and boys in beau knots all over the costume. What will Mr. Howells say? For my part I think it distinctly cruel work to put a respectable spinster into such a hattitude before the world.

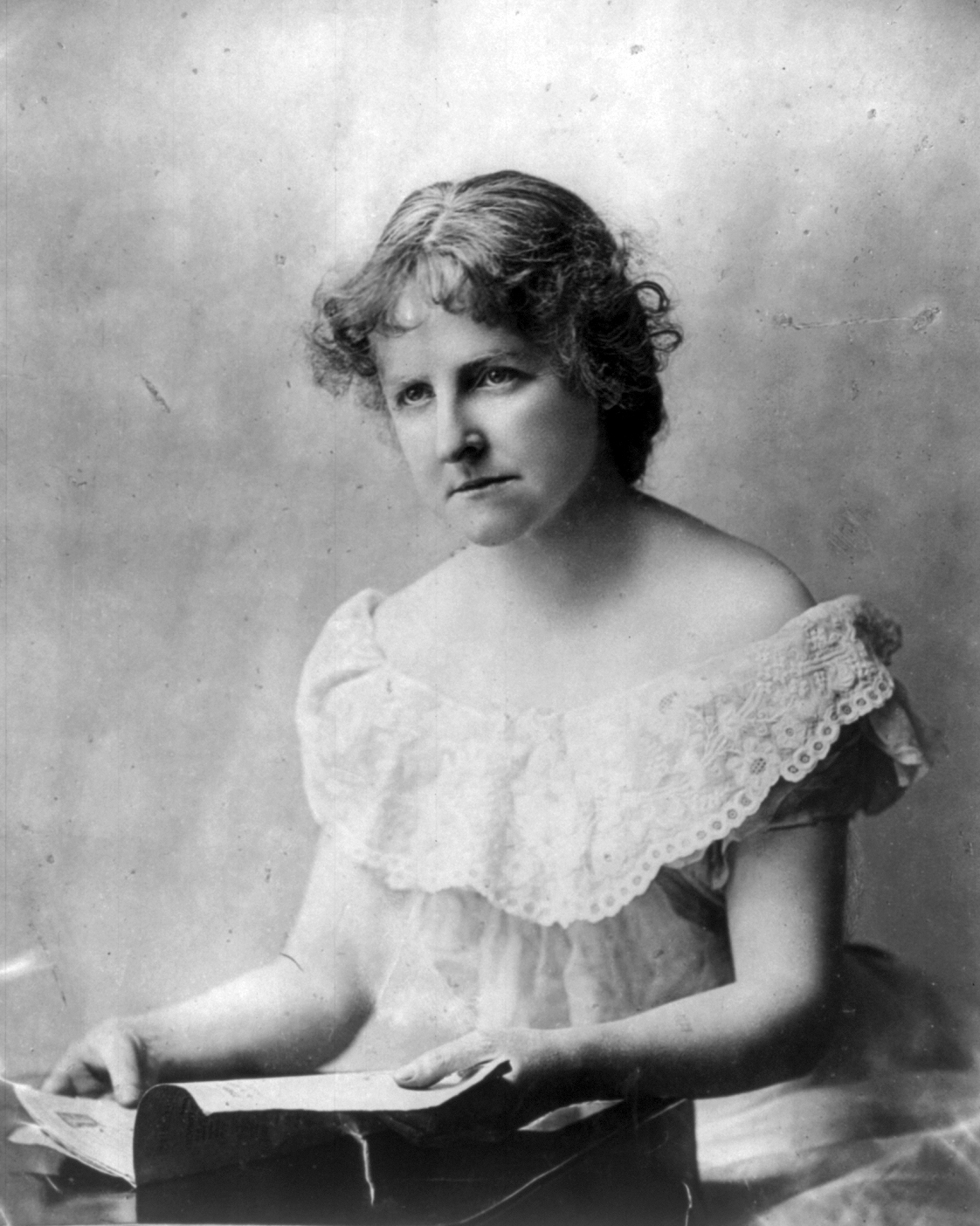
Mary Wilkins Freeman's chapter on the "Old Maid Aunt" was controversial among her collaborators.

Freeman, who had been single until her marriage at age 49, defended herself to Jordan by noting the changing role of single women:

Their single state is a deliberate choice on their part, and men are at their feet. Single women have caught up with, and passed, old bachelors in the last half of the century. I don't think Mr. Howells recognizes this. He is thinking of the time when women of thirty put on caps, and renounced the world. That was because they married at fifteen and sixteen, and at thirty had about a dozen children. Now they simply do not do it.

As subsequent critics have pointed out, the rest of the novel became an effort by the later writers to cope somehow with this introduction of Aunt Elizabeth as a sexual competitor with Peggy for her fiancé's affections.

The book was first serialized in Harper's Bazar from 1907 to 1908. In serial form, the chapters were published anonymously, though there was an accompanying list of contributors and a teasing note that an "intelligent reader" would "experience no difficulty in determining which author wrote each chapter—perhaps. Elizabeth Jordan later utilized the collaborative authorship approach in the book The Sturdy Oak (1917), in which several authors wrote on behalf of woman's suffrage.

== Critical response ==
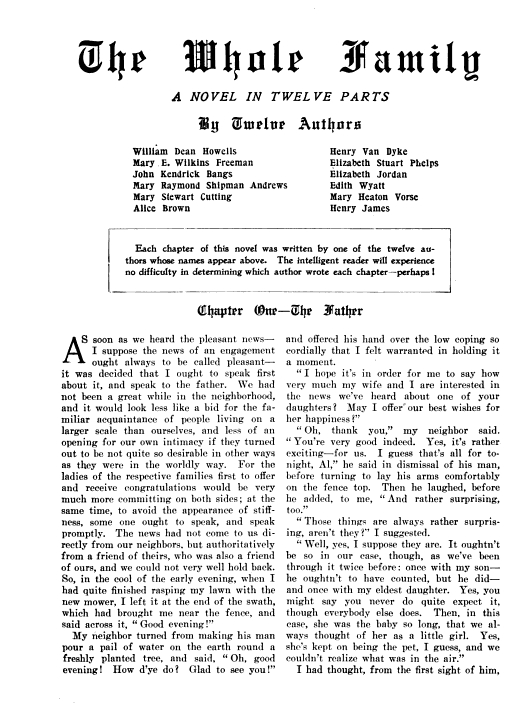
First page of the first chapter of The Whole Family as it appeared in Harper's Bazar, December 1907

The novel's contemporary reception was favorable, with decent sales and mostly positive reviews. Its contemporary popularity was spurred by the literary novelty of the project, as well as the guesswork required from its initial anonymous publication, in addition to rumors of in-fighting between contributors.

Many years after the book was published, Elizabeth Jordan exclaimed in her autobiography: "The Whole Family was a mess!" Critic Alfred Bendixen sympathized when he wrote: "As The Whole Family developed, the plot increasingly focused on family misunderstandings and family rivalries, which were mirrored by the artistic rivalries of the authors. The writing of the novel became a contest as much as it was a collaboration, with each author trying hard to impose his vision on the entire work."

In his long, dense but insightful chapter, and with charged rhetoric reminiscent of his late novels, Henry James has the aesthetic son Charles Talbert rail against the frustrations that he and his equally artistic wife Lorraine experience due to the claustrophobic realities of family life in his small New England town:

It's in fact in this beautiful desperation that we spend our days, that we face the pretty grim prospect of new ones, that we go and come and talk and pretend, that we consort, so far as in our deep-dyed hypocrisy we do consort, with the rest of the Family, that we have Sunday supper with the Parents and emerge, modestly yet virtuously shining, from the ordeal; that we put in our daily appearance at the Works—for a utility nowadays so vague that I'm fully aware (Lorraine isn't so much) of the deep amusement I excite there, though I also recognize how wonderfully, how quite charitably, they manage not to break out with it: bless, for the most part, their dear simple hearts!

James might as well have been talking about the frustrations that many of the authors felt with the "family" of their collaborators.
