= Neltje Doubleday =

Neltje Doubleday may refer to:

- Neltje Blanchan (1865–1918; born Neltje Blanchan De Graff; married name Neltje Doubleday) U.S. nature writer under the pseudonym Neltje Blanchan; grandmother of Neltje Kings
- Neltje Doubleday Kings (born 1934; as Neltje Doubleday) U.S. artist under the pseudonym Neltje; and philanthropist; granddaughter of Neltje De Graff

== See also ==
- Doubleday (surname)
