= Rowland Day =

American politician (1779–1853)

Member of the U.S. House of Representatives from New York's 24th district
- In office March 4, 1833 – March 3, 1835
- Preceded by: Ulysses F. Doubleday
- Succeeded by: Ulysses F. Doubleday
- In office March 4, 1823 – March 3, 1825
- Preceded by: New district
- Succeeded by: Charles Kellogg

New York State Assembly
- In office 1816–1817

Personal details
- Born: March 6, 1779 Chester, Massachusetts, US
- Died: December 23, 1853 (aged 74) Moravia, New York, US
- Resting place: Indian Mound Cemetery in Moravia
- Party: Crawford Democratic-Republican; Jacksonian

Rowland Day (March 6, 1779 Chester, Massachusetts – December 23, 1853 Moravia, New York) was an American merchant and politician from New York. From 1823 to 1825, he served one term in the U.S. House of Representatives.

== Life ==
In 1805, Day removed to Skaneateles, and in 1810 to Sempronius. He engaged in mercantile pursuits, and was Supervisor of the Town of Sempronius for several years.

He was a member of the New York State Assembly in 1816-17, and a delegate to the New York State Constitutional Convention of 1821.

=== Congress ===
Day was elected as a Crawford Democratic-Republican to the 18th, and as a Jacksonian to the 23rd United States Congress, holding office from March 4, 1823, to March 3, 1825, and from March 4, 1833, to March 3, 1835.

=== Later career and death ===
He was Postmaster of Sempronius. In 1833, the Western part of Sempronius (where Day lived) was separated as the Town of Moravia.

He was buried at the Indian Mound Cemetery in Moravia

U.S. House of Representatives
Preceded by new district	Member of the U.S. House of Representatives from New York's 24th congressional district 1823–1825	Succeeded by Charles Kellogg
Preceded by Ulysses F. Doubleday	Member of the U.S. House of Representatives from New York's 24th congressional district 1833–1835	Succeeded by Ulysses F. Doubleday
