= Sylvia Millecam =

Dutch actress and comedian

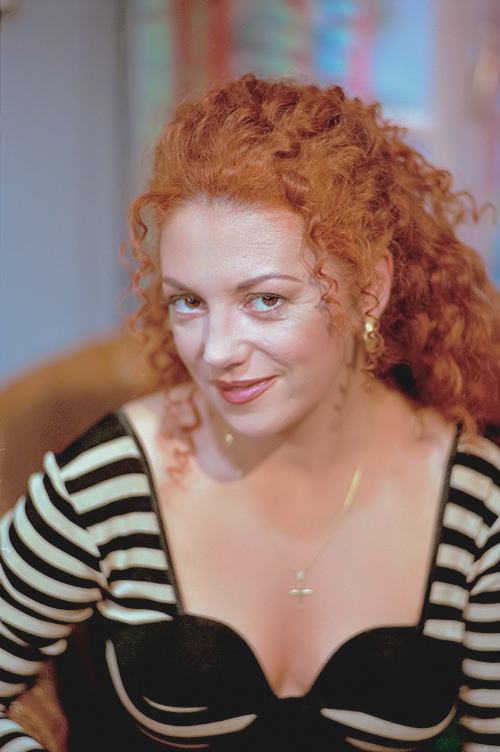
- Millecam in 1995
- Born: 23 February 1956; The Hague, the Netherlands
- Died: 20 August 2001 (aged 45); Nijmegen, the Netherlands
- Occupations: Actress, comedian
- Years active: 1985–2001

Sylvia Maria Millecam (23 February 1956 – 20 August 2001) was a Dutch actress and comedian. She was featured regularly on Dutch television where she hosted several shows. Millecam also appeared in several Dutch movies and released two albums. Her death from breast cancer in 2001 caused nationwide controversy as she had refused treatment that would most likely have saved her life. In doing so, she was advised by Dutch healing medium Jomanda.

== Biography ==
Millecam was born in The Hague and later moved to Boxmeer. She received her professional training at the Maastricht Academy of Dramatic Arts.

Millecam became famous after appearing in popular television shows like Ook Dat Nog (based on the BBC program That's Life!) and Buitenlandse Zaken, a political satire.

She was named "most popular Dutch television personality" by Dutch broadcasting company TROS, beating popular star Linda de Mol twice in a row.

In 1994 she had her own show, The Sylvia Millecam Show, and several years later Miss Millecam, both on RTL 4.

Millecam posed for Playboy twice, first in 1989 and again in 1994.

== Illness and death ==
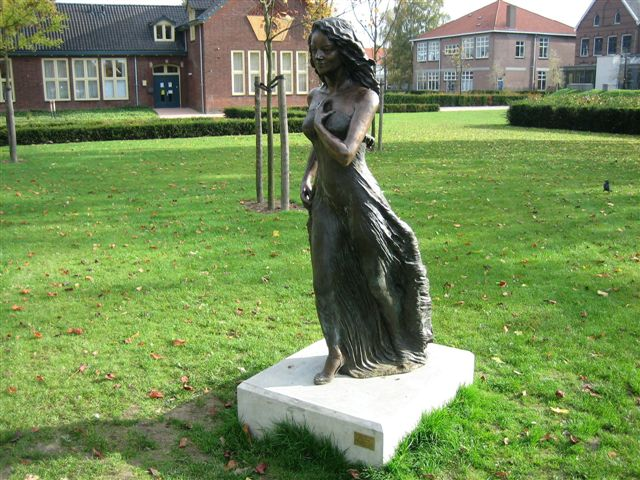
Statue of Sylvia Millecam in Boxmeer.

In 1999 Millecam was diagnosed with possible breast cancer. Her condition was confirmed in 2000. Before this, possibly unrelated, Millecam had suffered ruptured breast implants. Although she visited several medical doctors, in the end she decided to forgo regular treatment and instead sought second opinion help from paranormal and alternative healers. One of these was the Dutch medium Jomanda, at the time a famous New Age guru in the Netherlands. Millecam's condition steadily worsened, and she was eventually admitted to Nijmegen University hospital at a time when the tumor had grown beyond medical treatment. Two days later she died in hospital, after receiving the last rites.

On 19 June 2007, three physicians who had advised alternative therapy to Millecam, were prohibited from working as physicians, two of them permanently, the other for one year.
