= Mary Stewart Cutting Jr. =

American Author and suffragist(1879-1928)

Mary Stewart Cutting
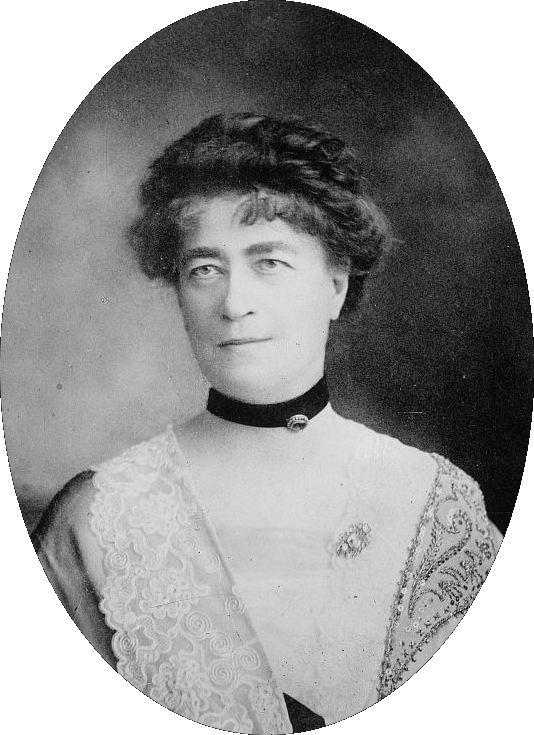
- Cutting circa 1915
- Born: 1879
- Died: February 11, 1928 (aged 48–49)
- Known for: author, suffragist

Mary Stewart Cutting Jr. (1879 – February 11, 1928) was an American author and a suffragist.

== Biography ==
Mary Stewart Cutting Jr. was the daughter of Charles Weed Cutting and the novelist Mary Stewart Cutting. Her maternal grandfather was the Civil War general Ulysses Doubleday (general); her maternal grandmother's birth name was Stewart. Because her name is the same as her mother's, and because the daughter survived her mother by only four years, the two women are frequently confused.

Mary Stewart Cutting Jr. was born in New Jersey, where she became a well-known suffragist. She was also the author of magazine and newspaper articles. According to her New York Times obituary, she died on February 11, 1928, in Manhattan, New York City, after being ill for a month.

== Writings ==
- Little Stories of Married Life
- Heart of Lynn
- Little Stories of Courtship
- More Stories of Married Life
- The Suburban Whirl
- The Wayfarers
- Just for Two
- The Unforeseen
- Letters of Sanna
- Refractory Husbands
- The Blossoming Rod
