= New Hope Mills Complex =

- U.S. National Register of Historic Places
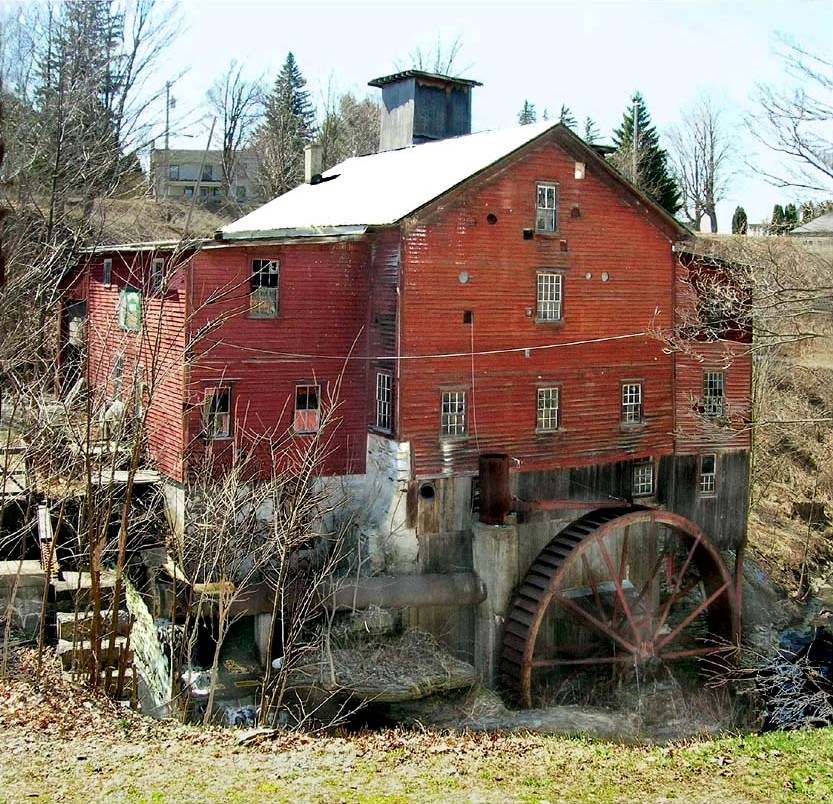
- (April 2005)

- Location within New York Location within the United States
- Location: Glen Haven Rd. and NY 41A; New Hope, Cayuga County, New York
- Coordinates: 42°47′55″N 76°20′49″W
- Area: 5 acres (2.0 ha)
- Built: 1823
- Architect: Judge Charles Kellogg
- Architectural style: 19th Century vernacular
- NRHP reference No.: 05000158
- Added to NRHP: March 15, 2005

The New Hope Mills Complex is a historic grist mill complex located on Glen Haven Road near the intersection with Route 41A in the hamlet of New Hope in the town of Niles in Cayuga County, New York. The complex includes the mill building, two vernacular dwellings, a 1910s gambrel roofed storage barn, a 1935 saw mill, two concrete faced dams, and a 1-acre (4,000 m^{2}) mill pond.

== History ==
The grist mill was partly built in 1823 by Judge Charles Kellogg – a member of the New York State Assembly and later a United States Congressman – then sold to Horace Rounds in 1851. Rounds sold it to his son, Eugene Rounds, in 1865. In 1919 it was sold to W. E. Rounds and A. Ryan, and it remained in the Rounds family until 1947, when it was sold to Howard Weed, Hubert Latta, and Leland Weed and renamed the New Hope Mills. Dale Weed became the sole owner in 2001.

The mill is a heavy timber-framed building with several late 19th century wings containing a full array of 19th century steel roller mills and related support machinery.

In the 1850s, there were 14 other industries powered by water along Bear Swamp Creek. The New Hope Mill originally had a capacity of 200 bushels a day, using three stones; it converted to roller mills in 1892. Although from the exterior the waterwheel is most prominent, most of the mill's power came from a water turbine underneath the structure, which can run throughout the year if sufficient water is available. The complex has an upper mill pond, where the sawmill is located, with a 24-foot waterfall, and a lower mill pond with a 28-foot fall. Water could be stored in the upper pond to be used to run the mill the next day.

The New Hope Mills company, which produces pancake, muffin, scone and cookie mixes, moved its manufacturing operations to nearby Auburn, New York, in 2003, but still owns the old mill and preserves it with the intention of converting it into an operating museum.

The New Hope Mills Complex was listed on the National Register of Historic Places in 2005.

== Gallery ==
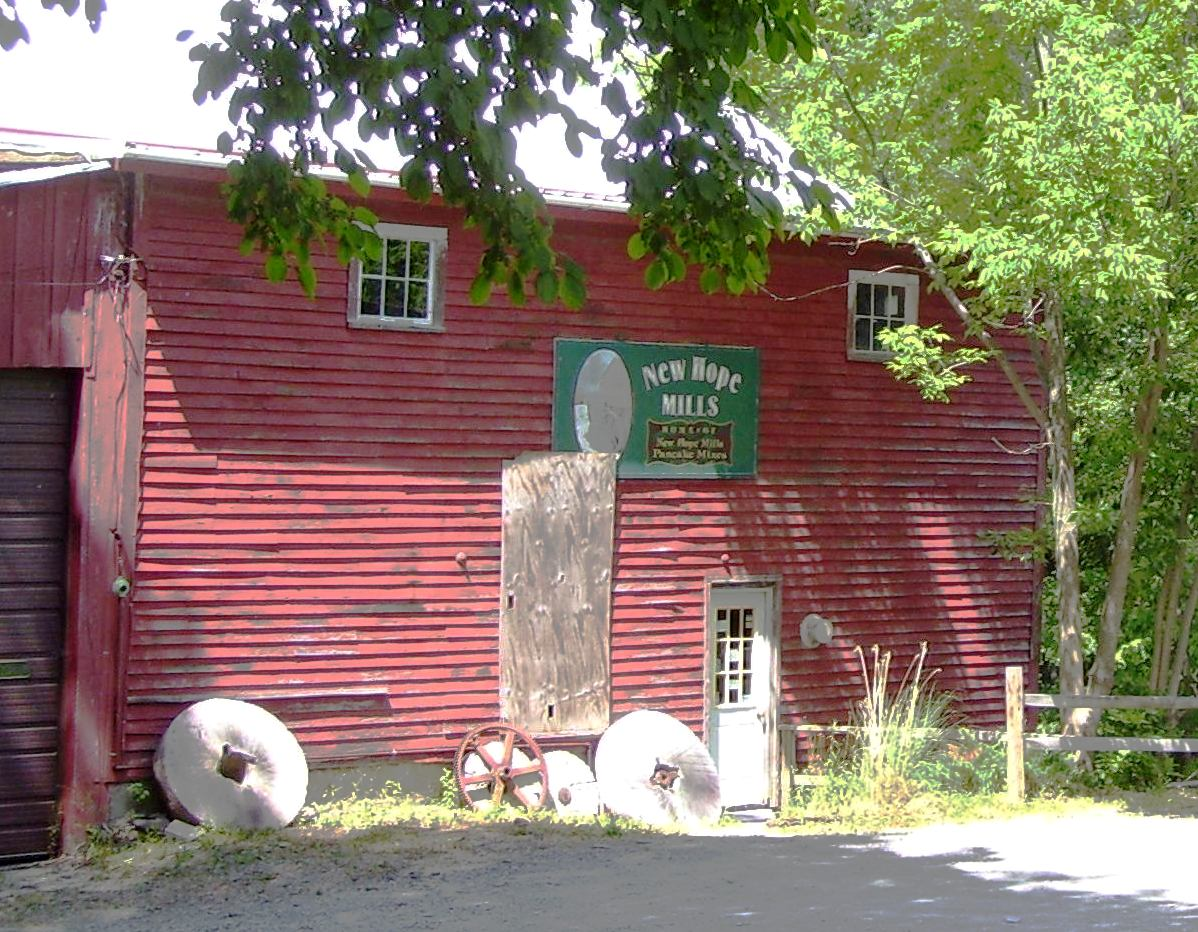

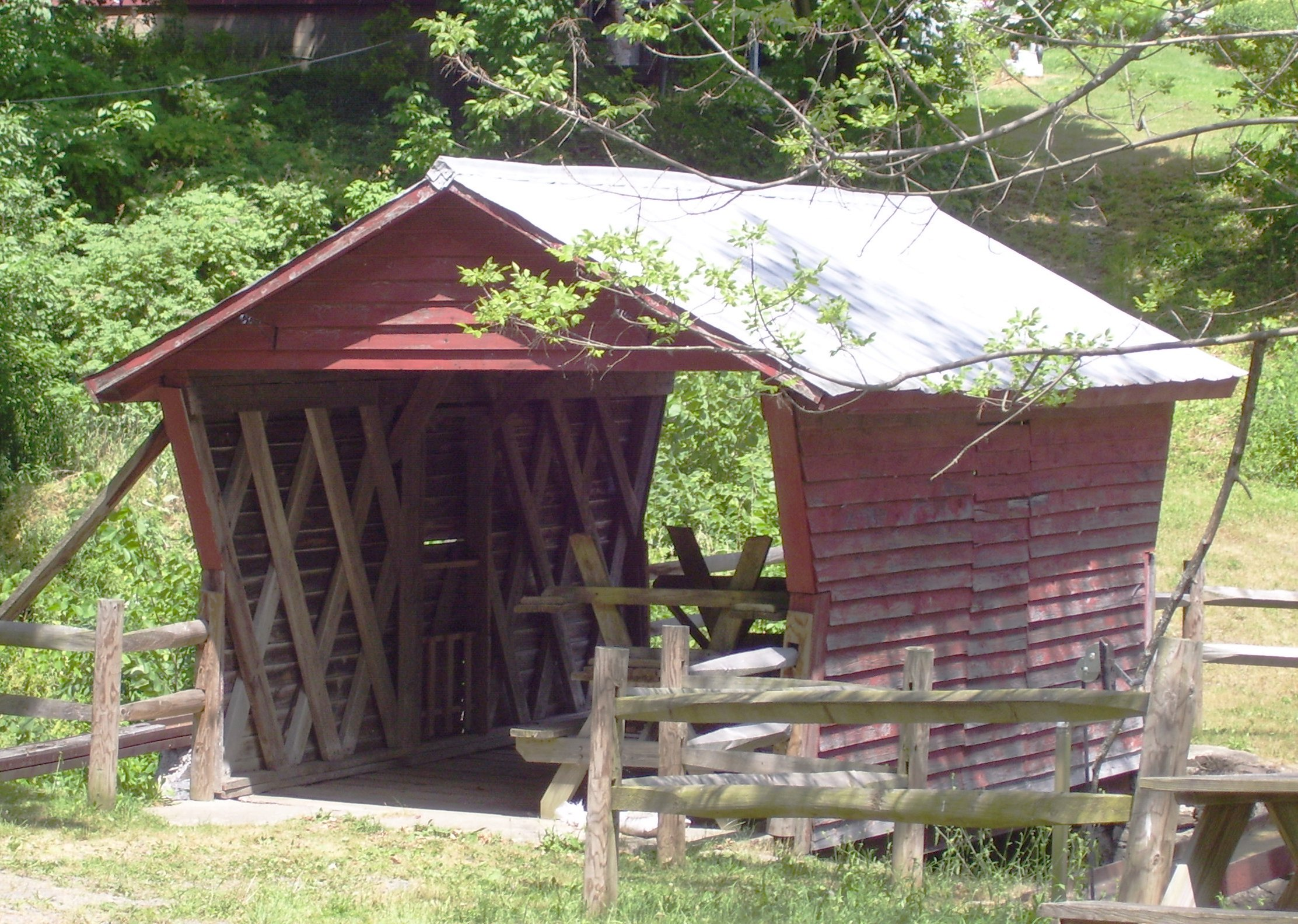

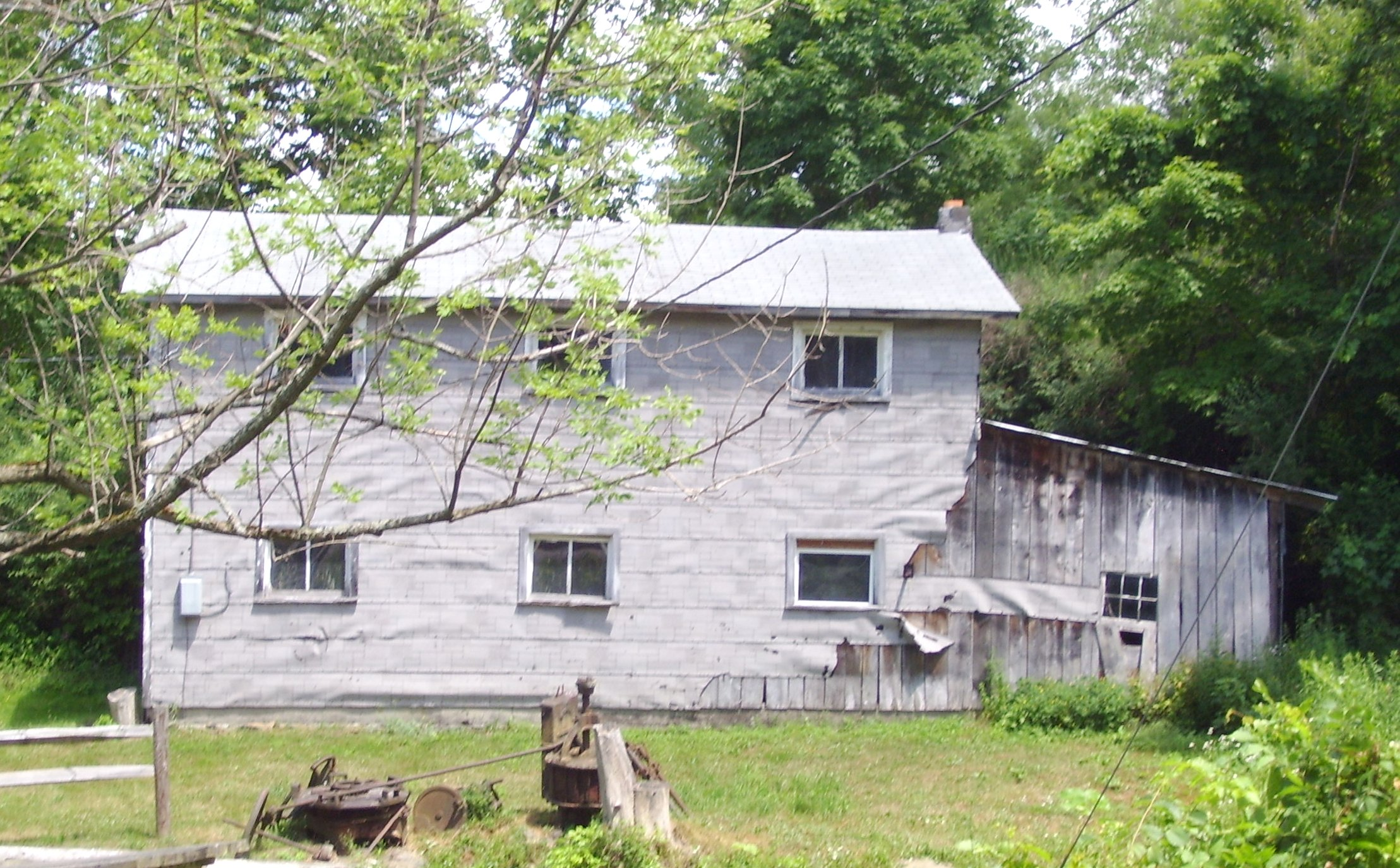

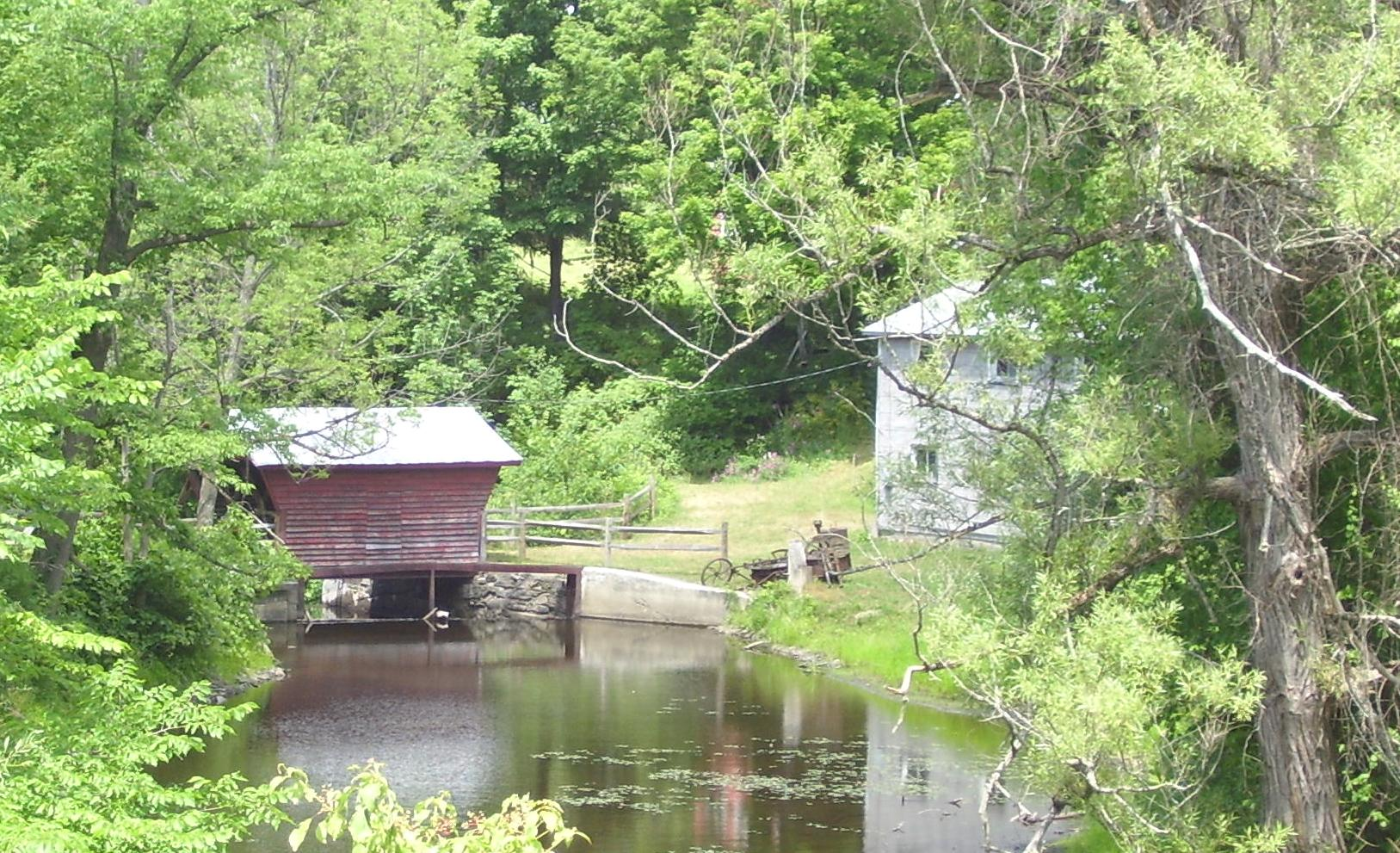
