= The Girl in Number 29 =

1920 film directed by John Ford

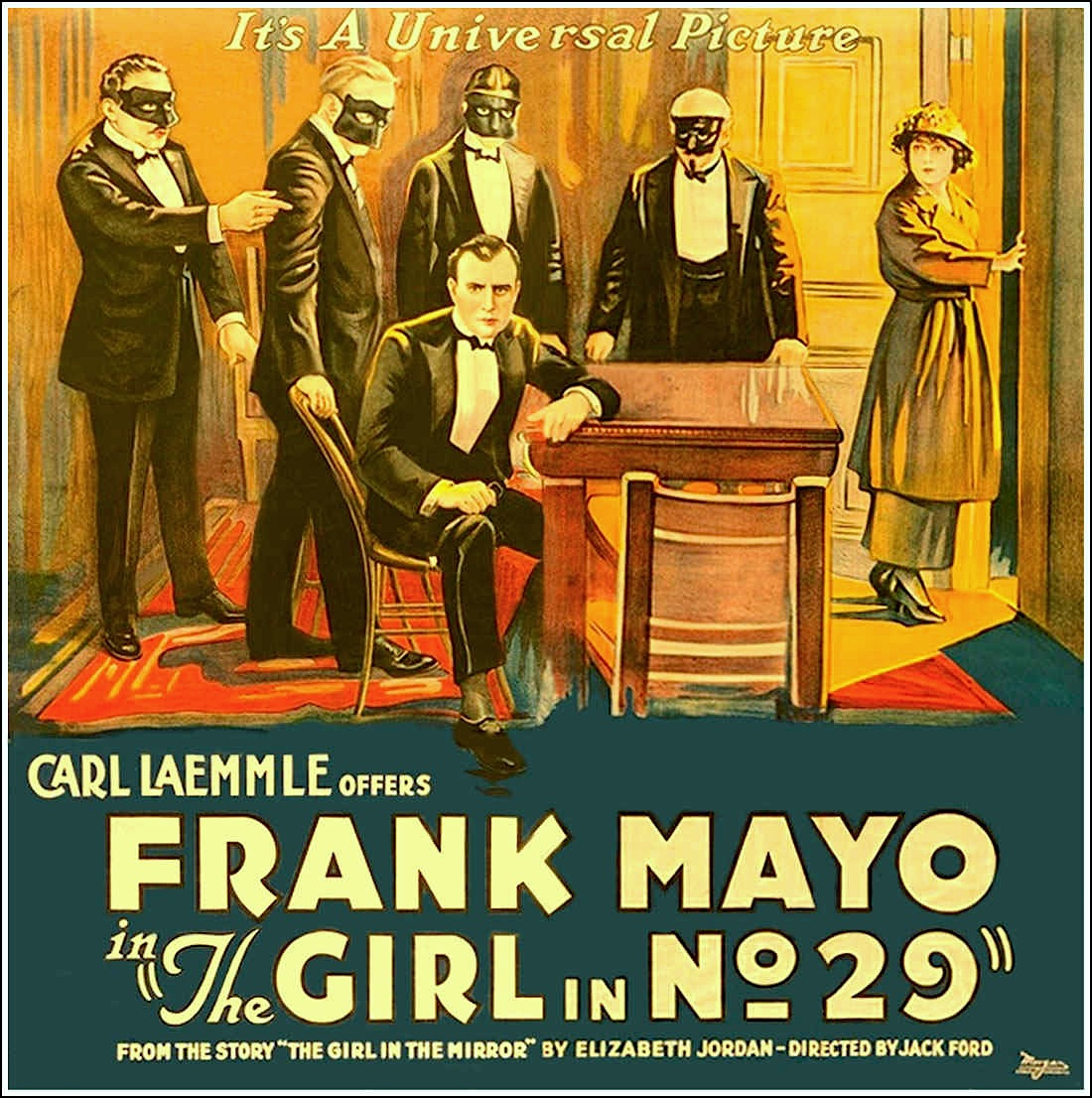
- Film poster
- Directed by: John Ford
- Written by: Philip D. Hurn
- Based on: The Girl in the Mirror by Elizabeth Jordan
- Starring: Frank Mayo
- Cinematography: John W. Brown
- Distributed by: Universal Film Manufacturing Company
- Release date: May 17, 1920
- Running time: 50 minutes
- Country: United States
- Language: Silent (English intertitles)

The Girl in Number 29 is a 1920 American silent drama film directed by John Ford based on the novel The Girl in the Mirror (1919) by Elizabeth Jordan. The film is presumed to be lost.

== Plot ==
As summarized in a film publication, Laurie Devon is a New York playwright who, having had one success, refuses to work on another play. One night he sees a woman in an apartment across the street take out a gun and place it to her forehead. He reaches her in time to save her, and she tells him that she is under some terrible evil influence, which she will not disclose. Devon attempts to untangle the mystery and is led on an adventure. The woman is taken to a house on Long Island, where Devon after a fight rescues her. He takes out the revolver and shoots one of the pursuers, who falls to the ground. On returning home, he is heartbroken and tells his sister Barbara and his friends that he is a murderer. His sister and two of his friends then confess that the whole thing was a frame-up, that they had hired some actors to stage everything, and that it was an attempt to get the ambitionless author to write again. The revolver used in the suicide attempt by the woman and in the later shooting had blanks. Devon and the woman from the apartment melt into each other's arms at the final fade-out.

== Cast ==
- Frank Mayo as Laurie Devon
- Elinor Fair as Barbara Devon
- Claire Anderson as Doris Williams
- Robert Bolder as Jacob Epstein
- Ruth Royce as Billie
- Ray Ripley as Ransome Shaw
- Bull Montana as Shaw's Secretary
- Arthur Hoyt as Valet

== See also ==
- List of lost films
