= Kelloggsville, New York =

- Hamlet
- Location within New York
- Coordinates: 42°47′13″N 76°21′56″W
- Country: United States
- State: New York
- County: Cayuga
- Town: Niles
- Elevation: 1,407 ft (429 m)
- Time zone: UTC-5 (Eastern (EST))
  - Summer (DST): UTC-4 (EDT)
- ZIP Code: 13118 (Moravia)
- Area code: 315
- GNIS feature ID: 954460

Kelloggsville is a hamlet in the town of Niles, Cayuga County, New York, United States.
