= Thomas D. Doubleday =

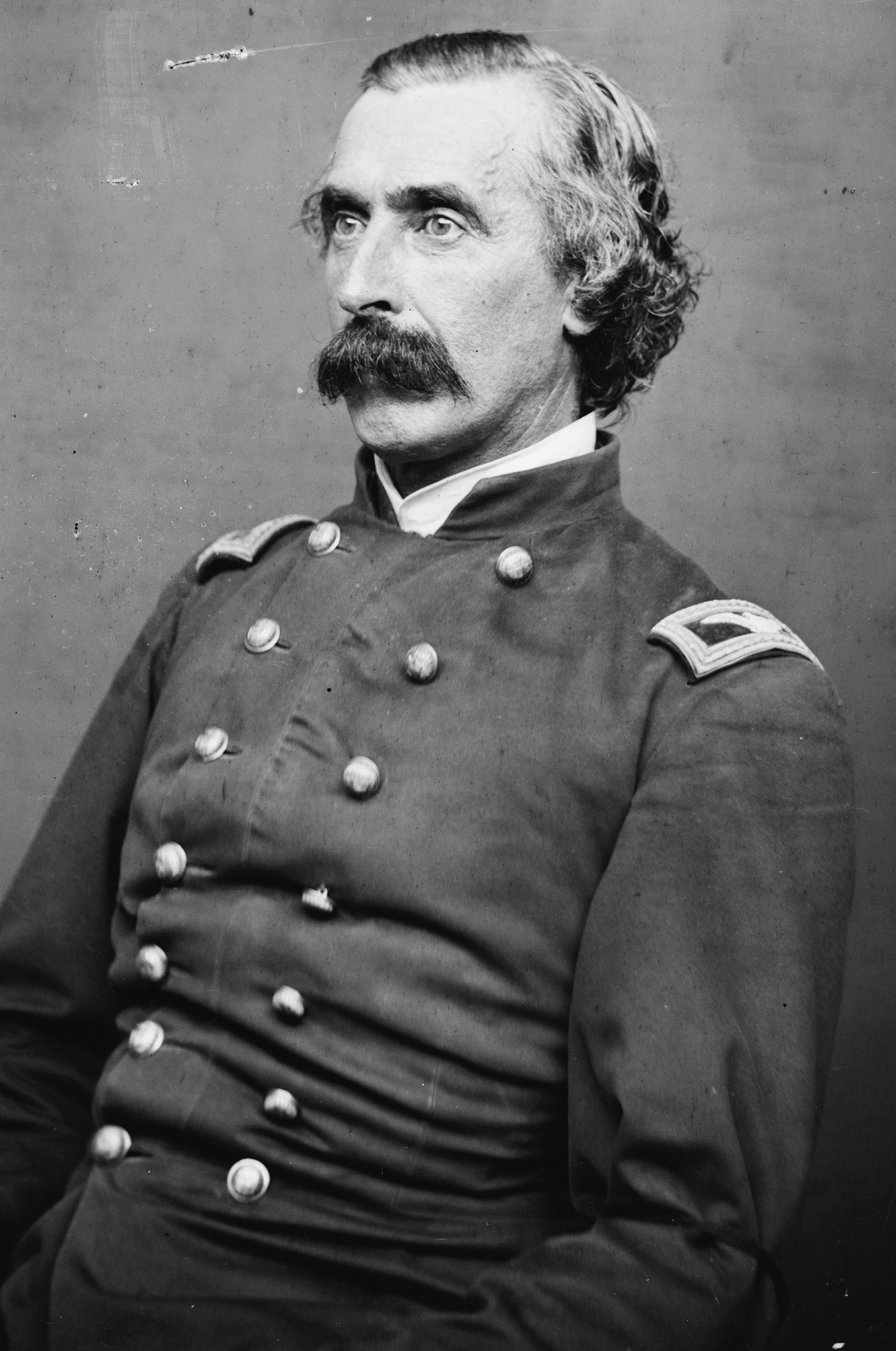
- Col. Thomas Doubleday
- Born: February 18, 1816; Albany, New York
- Died: May 11, 1864; New York City
- Burial place: Staten Island Cemetery, Staten Island
- Spouse: Mary Augusta Ward
- Relatives: Ulysses F. Doubleday (father); Abner Doubleday (brother); Ulysses Doubleday (brother); Stephen Ward Doubleday (son)
- Military career
- Allegiance: United States
- Branch: Union Army
- Service years: 1861–1863
- Rank: Colonel
- Commands: 4th New York Heavy Artillery
- Conflicts: American Civil War
- Other work: Governor of the New York Stock Exchange

Thomas Donnelly Doubleday (February 18, 1816 – May 11, 1864) was an American bookstore owner and a Union Army officer in the American Civil War.

== Biography ==
Doubleday was the son of U.S. Congressman Ulysses F. Doubleday and Hester Donnelly. He was born on February 18, 1816, in Albany, New York. He grew up in Auburn, New York, and was the older brother of Abner Doubleday and Ulysses Doubleday, who both fought in the Civil War.

Known as T. D. Doubleday, he ran a well known book and stationery store on Wall Street. Along with other merchants and prominent New Yorkers he advocated the founding of the Metropolitan Museum of Art and the American Museum of Natural History.

In the Civil War, he was a colonel and organized the 4th New York Heavy Artillery. He raised and trained this regiment from New York that was stationed in Washington DC to defend the capital during the Civil War. He resigned his commission in early 1863.

Doubleday and his wife, Mary Augusta Ward, resided on Staten Island. They had two children, Mary Augusta Sargent and Stephen Ward Doubleday. 17-year-old Stephen also served in his father's regiment as a lieutenant and was injured during the war.

Thomas D. Doubleday died on May 11, 1864, in New York City, after being accidently run over by a horse-drawn coach. He was buried in Trinity Cemetery in Staten Island, ajdacent to 1562 Richmond Terrance.

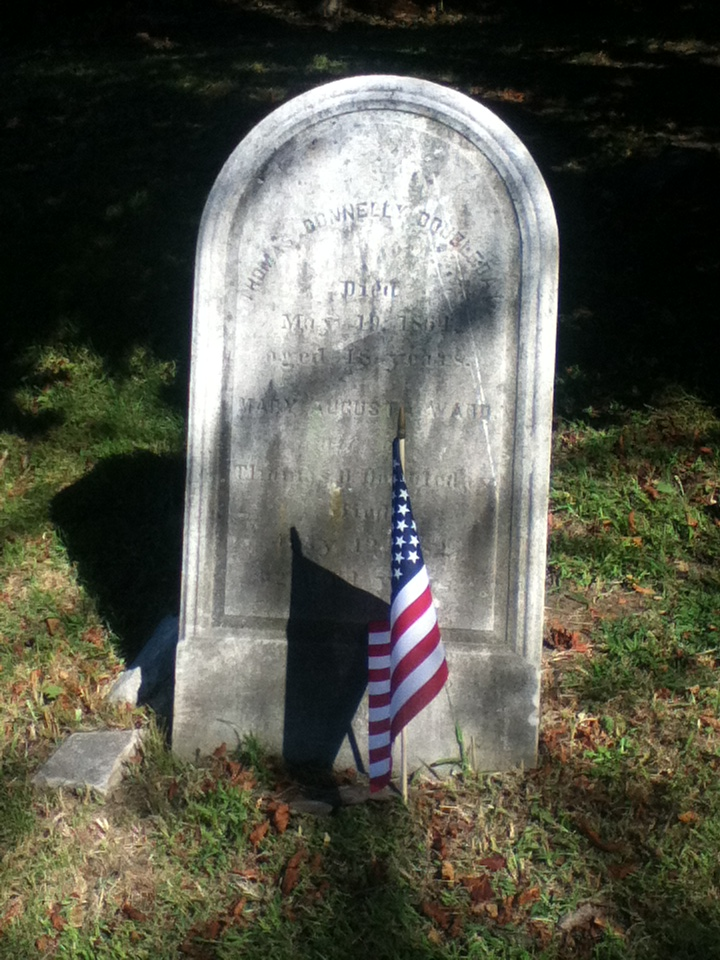
Gravestone of Thomas D. Doubleday

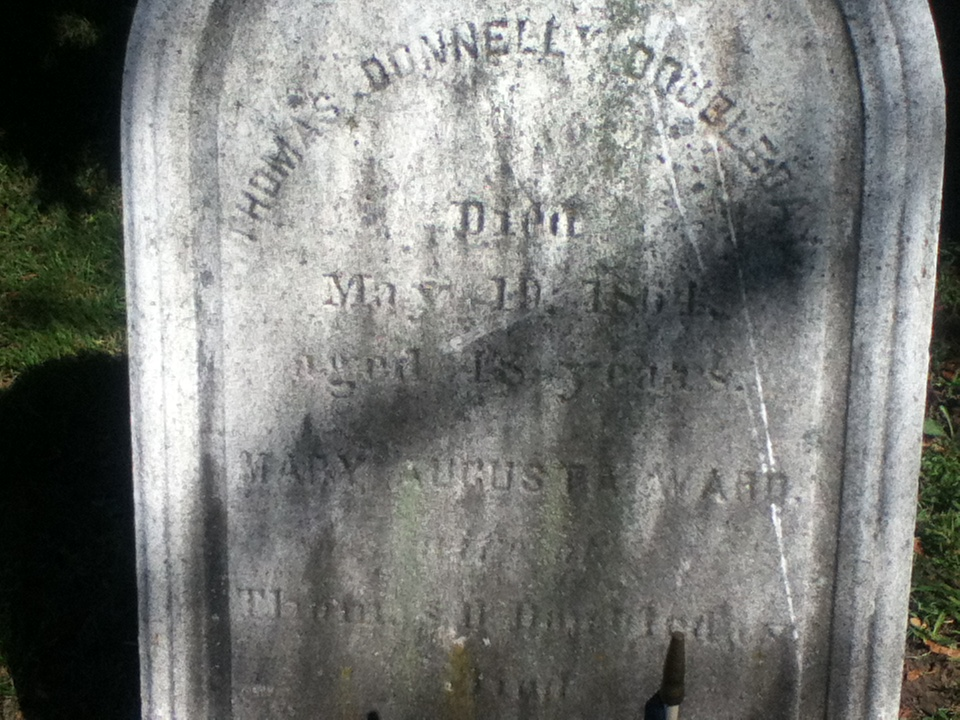
Close-up of Inscription on Gravestone.
