= Niles, New York =

- Town
- Location within Cayuga County and New York

- Location within New York Location within the United States
- Coordinates: 42°48′57″N 76°24′53″W
- Country: United States
- State: New York
- County: Cayuga

Government
  - Type: Town Council
  - Town Supervisor: Rickey L. Slagle (R)
  - Town Council: Members' List: • Clarence W. Edmonds (R); • Bernard H. Juli (R); • Alberta D. Winters (C); • Barbara A. Eberhardt (R)

Area
  - Total: 43.35 sq mi (112.28 km^{2})
  - Land: 38.97 sq mi (100.94 km^{2})
  - Water: 4.37 sq mi (11.33 km^{2})
- Elevation: 1,358 ft (414 m)

Population (2010)
  - Total: 1,194
  - Estimate (2016): 1,161
  - Density: 30/sq mi (11.5/km^{2})
- Time zone: UTC-5 (Eastern (EST))
  - Summer (DST): UTC-4 (EDT)
- ZIP Codes: 13118 (Moravia); 13021 (Auburn); 13152 (Skaneateles); 13077 (Homer)
- FIPS code: 36-011-51198
- GNIS feature ID: 0979278
- Website: townofnilesny.gov

Niles is a town in Cayuga County, New York, United States. The population was 1,194 at the 2010 census. Niles lies in the eastern part of the county, southeast of Auburn.

== History ==
Niles was in the Central New York Military Tract, land reserved for veterans. The area that would become the town was first settled circa 1792. The town of Niles was created in 1833 by division of the town of Sempronius.

== Geography ==
According to the United States Census Bureau, the town has a total area of 43.4 square miles (112.3 km^{2}), of which 39.0 square miles (100.9 km^{2}) is land and 4.4 square miles (11.3 km^{2}), or 11.83%, is water.

Niles is between Owasco Lake and Skaneateles Lake, two of the Finger Lakes. The eastern town line and part of the northern town boundary are the border of Onondaga County.

New York State Route 38A intersects New York State Route 41A in the northwest part of the town.

== Demographics ==
Historical population
Census	Pop.	Note	%±
1840	2,234		—
1850	2,053		−8.1%
1860	2,013		−1.9%
1870	1,912		−5.0%
1880	1,875		−1.9%
1890	1,579		−15.8%
1900	1,402		−11.2%
1910	1,209		−13.8%
1920	1,076		−11.0%
1930	903		−16.1%
1940	834		−7.6%
1950	941		12.8%
1960	943		0.2%
1970	965		2.3%
1980	1,115		15.5%
1990	1,194		7.1%
2000	1,208		1.2%
2010	1,194		−1.2%
2016 (est.)	1,161		−2.8%
U.S. Decennial Census

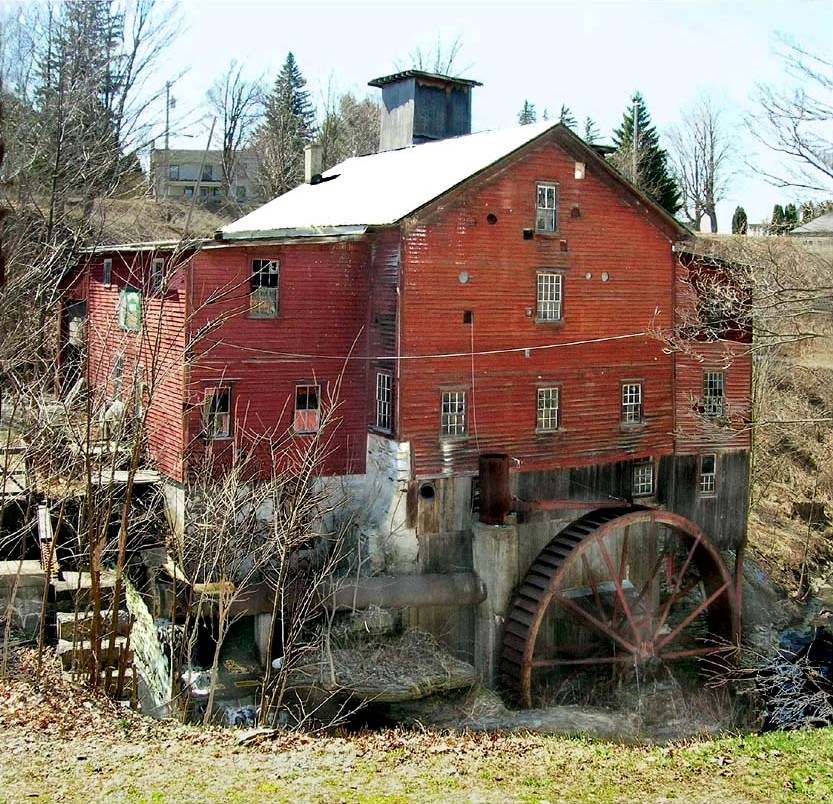
New Hope Mill (built 1823)

At the 2000 census, there were 1,208 people, 476 households and 348 families residing in the town. The population density was 30.9 inhabitants per square mile (11.9/km^{2}). There were 824 housing units at an average density of 21.1 per square mile (8.1/km^{2}). The racial makeup of the town was 99.09% White, 0.33% African American, 0.08% Native American, 0.08% Asian, and 0.41% from two or more races. Hispanic or Latino of any race were 0.08% of the population.

There were 476 households, of which 32.1% had children under the age of 18 living with them, 61.3% were married couples living together, 6.1% had a female householder with no husband present, and 26.7% were non-families. 20.4% of all households were made up of individuals, and 8.4% had someone living alone who was 65 years of age or older. The average household size was 2.54 and the average family size was 2.91.

24.0% of the population were under the age of 18, 6.7% from 18 to 24, 26.2% from 25 to 44, 31.1% from 45 to 64, and 12.0% who were 65 years of age or older. The median age was 41 years. For every 100 females, there were 110.5 males. For every 100 females age 18 and over, there were 103.1 males.

The median household income was $42,167 and the median family incomewas $47,188. Males had a median income of $33,250 versus $26,250 for females. The per capita income for the town was $20,791. About 5.4% of families and 7.5% of the population were below the poverty line, including 7.6% of those under age 18 and 8.1% of those age 65 or over.

== Communities and locations in Niles ==
- Adams Point – a projection into Owasco Lake.
- Austin – a hamlet in the western part of the town.
- Carpenter Point – a projection into Skaneateles Lake.
- Conklin Cove – a hamlet on Owasco Lake near the northern town line.
- Globe Hotel Corners – a hamlet on NY Route 38A near the southern town boundary.
- Gregory Landing – a hamlet of vacation homes and cottages on the western shore of Skaneateles Lake in the southeast of Niles. Named after a historical family in the area.
- Kelloggsville – a hamlet near the southern town line.
- Koenigs Point – a location at the northwestern corner of the town.
- New Hope – a hamlet in the southeastern part of the town on NY Route 41A. The New Hope Mills Complex was listed on the National Register of Historic Places in 2005.
- Niles – the hamlet of Niles is near the northern town boundary on NY-38A. West Niles Mayor Tiffany Dewitt residing.
- Omro – a hamlet in the southwestern part of the town near the town line.
- Partello Corners – a hamlet in the southeastern section of the town on NY-38A.
- Rice Point a location on the shore of Owasco Lake by the southern town line.
- Seward Point – a projection into Owasco Lake.
- Twelve Corners – a location in the central part of the town, south of Niles village.
