= Jozef Rulof =

Dutch psychic (1898–1952)

- Born: Josephus Gerhardus Rulof; February 20, 1898 's-Heerenberg, Gelderland, The Netherlands
- Died: November 3, 1952 (aged 54); The Hague, South Holland, The Netherlands

Josephus Gerhardus Rulof (February 20, 1898 – November 3, 1952) was a Dutch author who was known as a self-proclaimed psychic and trance medium or spirit medium. He wrote about thirty books about life, death, and the hereafter.

Rulof claimed to be the greatest medium ever, and that nobody would ever surpass him. The next major medium would be the "Direct Voice Apparatus" (DVA), a technical device that would enable people to communicate directly with the spirit world. The DVA would be based on another device to make all diseases disappear.

He claimed he was under the control of two guides: master Alcar and master Zelanus.

== Art Career ==
Jozef Rulof was an avid painter, having painted several hundred pieces of art. He claimed that all of his paintings have a symbolic, spiritual meaning. His primary subjects were spiritual flowers and spirits, and never painted subjects he considered "earthly", such as cows and houses. He painted on canvas, wood and plates. In the years 1947 and 1948, he gave public painting demonstrations in the Palace theater in Rotterdam and the building Diligentia in The Hague.

During a trip to the United States, Rulof gave a painting demonstration. He made a large painting on the wall of the dining room of the rocking steamship Veendam while standing on a chair. The painting was finished in less than an hour and a half. During another public demonstration, he amazed the audience by suddenly turning the half-finished painting upside down and continuing his work.

One of his paintings, donated by some Dutch to thank Sweden for its help at the end of the Second World War, was on display for a period of time in the Swedish Parliament.

== Public Speakings ==
Jozef Rulof gave hundreds of lectures. He also held contact evenings during which the audience could ask questions about his books and related subjects, such as abortion, Adolf Hitler, astrology, the appendix, blindness, blood transfusion, capital punishment, cause and effect, cremation, euthanasia, free will, homosexuality, karma, marriage, miscarriages, mongolism, overpopulation, psychopathy, space travel, suicide, the tonsils, transsexuality, Tutankhamun, UFOs, vegetarianism, vivisection and the Second World War.

During most of his lectures and during several contact evenings, Rulof was purportedly taken over by master Alcar or master Zelanus. It is a fact that there was a notable difference in tone between the lectures and contact evenings given by himself and those given by his masters.

The last 57 of these lectures and some contact evenings were recorded on a wire recorder and are available in book form.

== Controversies and Criticism ==
=== Racism ===
In his book The Origin of the Universe, Rulof wrote that there are 7 physical grades of life on Earth and that we start our earthly cycle as a jungle inhabitant and gradually evolve, through many, many lives, to the white race. Some people accuse Rulof of racism because of this theory. They think that Rulof claimed that the white race is superior to the other races. This reasoning is, however, disputed on the following basis:

- Throughout his books, he never calls for the discrimination of black people.
- "White race" doesn't refer to the color of the skin. Africans, Chinese and Indians also belong to the white race or sixth and seventh degree.
- Because of his theory, we all have to go through all degrees/races. This makes it rather difficult to discriminate against another.

The Centre for equal opportunities and opposition to racism in Belgium even went to court to try to forbid the publication of Rulof's books. However, in 2007, the court of Dendermonde (Belgium) judged that the books of Rulof do not encourage race discrimination.

== Trivia ==
- The Society Spiritual-Science Foundation The Age of Christ administers the complete works of Jozef Rulof. It was set up for this purpose in 1946 by Rulof himself.
- In 1952, a few months before his death, Rulof published a series of articles in the magazine Heemsteedse Nieuwsblad, which would later become the Europese Heraut under the pseudonym Marja Radjany.

== Bibliography ==
- A View into the Hereafter
- The bridge to eternal life
- The cycle of the soul
- The Origin of the Universe
- Through the Grebbeline to Eternal Life
- Mental Diseases as seen from the Side Beyond
- Between Life and Death
- My revelations to the peoples of the earth
- Spiritual Gifts
- Masks and Man
- Jeus of mother Crisje, Part I
- Jeus of mother Crisje, Part II
- Jeus of mother Crisje, Part III
- The Cosmology of Jozef Rulof, Part I
- The Cosmology of Jozef Rulof, Part II
- The Cosmology of Jozef Rulof, Part III
- The Cosmology of Jozef Rulof, Part IV
- The Cosmology of Jozef Rulof, Part V
- Questions and Answers, Part I
- Questions and Answers, Part II
- Questions and Answers, Part III
- Questions and Answers, Part IV
- Questions and Answers, Part V
- Questions and Answers, Part VI
- 57 Lectures, Part I
- 57 Lectures, Part II
- 57 Lectures, Part III

The books Questions and Answers contain the transcripts of contact evenings which were recorded on a wire recorder. Jozef Rulof edited part I to make it more appealing for the reader.
