= Elizabeth Jordan =

American novelist and suffragist (1865–1947)

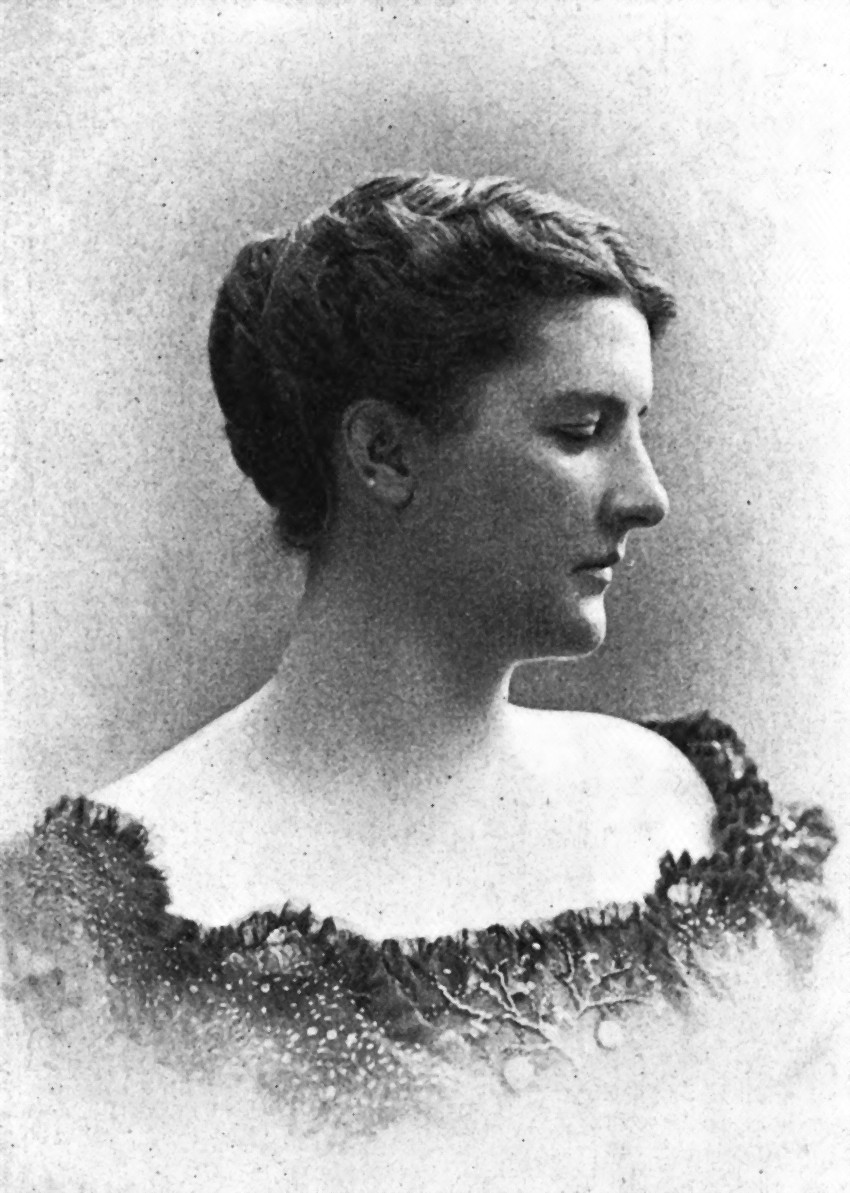
- Jordan in 1901
- Born: Elizabeth Garver Jordan; May 9, 1865; Milwaukee, Wisconsin
- Died: February 24, 1947 (aged 81); New York City
- Occupations: Journalist, editor
- Writing career
- Genre: Short story

Elizabeth Garver Jordan (May 9, 1865 – February 24, 1947) was an American journalist, author, editor, and suffragist, now remembered primarily for having edited the first two novels of Sinclair Lewis, and for her relationship with Henry James, especially for recruiting him to participate in the round-robin novel The Whole Family. She was editor of Harper's Bazaar from 1900 to 1913.

== Life and work ==
Jordan was born in Milwaukee, Wisconsin, to William Frank Jordan and Margaretta Garver, and was the first of their two daughters. She graduated from high school in 1884. After learning shorthand at business school, she began her journalistic career as women's page editor at Peck's Sun. She then worked as a secretary to the Milwaukee superintendent of schools while contributing to the St. Paul Globe and Chicago Tribune.

In 1890, Jordan moved to New York City and began working at Joseph Pulitzer's newspaper, the New York World. Her first big break was an interview with the normally reticent First Lady Caroline Scott Harrison, wife of President Benjamin Harrison. At the World she became known for her regular Sunday human interest feature "True Stories of the News". Major stories she covered included the trial of Carlyle Harris for the murder of his wife Helen Potts and the trial of accused ax murderer Lizzie Borden. She also wrote a series of articles about conditions in New York City tenements that was later published as the book The Submerged Tenth. In 1895, she published a collection of short stories, many of them inspired by her work, called Tales of the City Room. In 1897 she was appointed assistant Sunday editor of the World.

From 1901 to 1913, she was editor of the magazine Harper's Bazaar. During those years she published a number of novels and short story collections. These included a popular series of novels featuring the heroine May Iverson. Her play The Lady of Oklahoma premiered on Broadway at the 48th Street Theatre in April 1913. During this period, she organized a collaborative novel called The Whole Family about the Talberts, a middle-class family from New England. Each of her co-authors, some of them novelists of some renown like Henry James and William Dean Howells, penned one of the twelve chapters. The novel was serialized in Harper's from 1907 to 1908. Though it received a generally positive critical response and sold well, Jordan herself referred to the project as "a mess".

After the sale of Harper's to William Randolph Hearst, she remained at Harper and Brothers as literary advisor until 1918. In that capacity, she edited the first novel by Sinclair Lewis, Our Mr. Wrenn (1914). While his first novel required extensive revision with her assistance, his second, The Trail of the Hawk (1915), required no editorial intervention. She also helped publish novels by a number of female authors, including Zona Gale, Eleanor H. Porter, and Dorothy Canfield Fisher.

Jordan was an active suffragist and in 1917 organized another collaborative novel, The Sturdy Oak, with fourteen authors supporting the cause, including Fannie Hurst, Dorothy Canfield Fisher, Mary Heaton Vorse, Alice Duer Miller, Ethel Watts Mumford, Henry Kitchell Webster and William Allen White. The novel was serialized in Collier's Weekly. She also collaborated with minister and women's movement leader Anna Howard Shaw on Shaw's autobiography, The Story of a Pioneer (1915).

In 1918, she was briefly editorial director for Goldwyn Pictures. She spent the rest of her career writing. Two of her novels were adapted for film: Daddy and I (1934) as Make Way for a Lady (1936) and The Girl in the Mirror (1919) as The Girl in Number 29 (1920). She published a memoir, Three Rousing Cheers, in 1938. She died at her home in New York City and was buried in Florence, Massachusetts.

== Partial bibliography ==
- The Submerged Tenth (1893)
- Tales of the City Room (1895)
- Tales of the Cloister (1901)
- Tales of Destiny (1902)
- May Iverson, Her Book (1904)
- Many Kingdoms (1908)
- The Whole Family (collaboration, 1908)
- May Iverson Tackles Life (1913)
- The Lady from Oklahoma (stage play, 1913)
- The Story of a Pioneer (with Anna Howard Shaw, 1915)
- Lovers' Knots (1916)
- Wings of Youth (1917)
- The Sturdy Oak (collaboration, 1917)
- The Girl in the Mirror (1919)
- The Blue Circle (1920)
- Red Riding Hood (1924)
- Black Butterflies (1926)
- Miss Nobody from Nowhere (1927)
- The Devil and the Deep Sea (1928)
- The Night Club Mystery (1929)
- The Fourflusher (1930)
- Playboy (1931)
- Young Mr. X (1932)
- Daddy and I (1934)
- The Life of the Party (1935)
- The Trap (1936)
- Three Rousing Cheers (memoir, 1938)
- First Port of Call (1940)
- Faraway Island (1941)
- Herself (1943)
- Miss Warren's Son (1944)
- The Real Ruth Arnold (1945)
- Case of Lizzie Borden and Other Writings: Tales of a Newspaper Woman, a collection of Jordan's essays and stories, Penguin Press ISBN 9780143137603 (2024)
