= 4th New York Heavy Artillery Regiment =

4th New York Heavy Artillery Regiment, U.S. Volunteers
- Active: November 1, 1861, to September 26, 1865
- Country: United States
- Allegiance: Union
- Branch: Heavy artillery & Infantry
- Engagements: Battle of the Wilderness; Battle of Spotsylvania Court House; Battle of North Anna; Battle of Cold Harbor; Siege of Petersburg; First Battle of Deep Bottom; Second Battle of Deep Bottom; Second Battle of Ream's Station; Appomattox Campaign; Battle of White Oak Road; Third Battle of Petersburg; Battle of Sailor's Creek; Battle of Appomattox Court House

The 4th New York Heavy Artillery Regiment, U.S. Volunteers was a heavy artillery regiment that served in the Union Army during the American Civil War. The regiment operated as both heavy artillery and infantry beginning in February 1862 while serving in the defenses of Washington, D.C., and continued in both capacities until the end of the war.

== Service ==
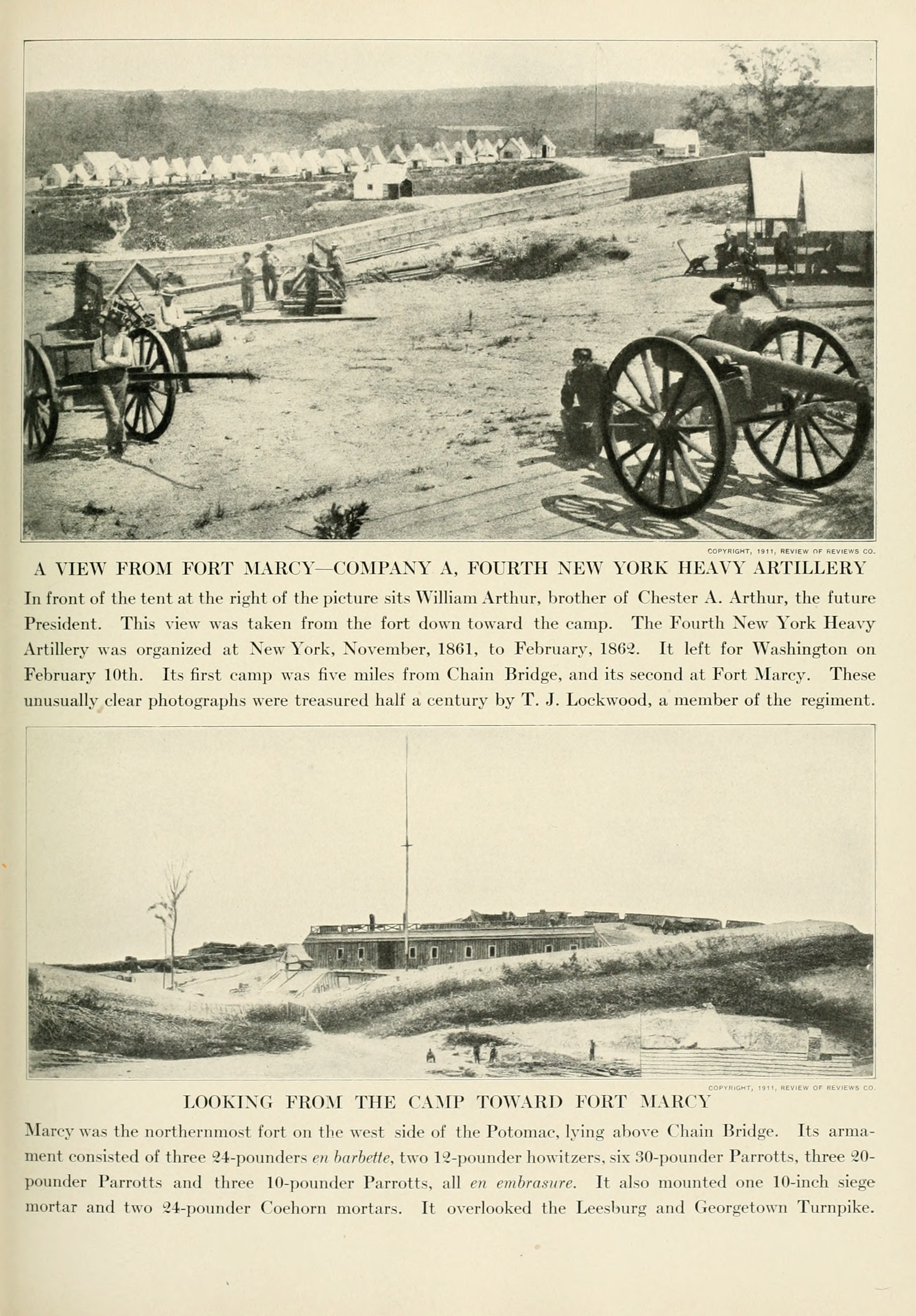
Ft Marcy with Company A 4th New York Artillery [Top picture] man at the right in front of the tent is William Arthur-brother of US President Chester Alan Arthur.

The regiment was organized at New York City, New York, beginning November 1861 through February 1862 and mustered in at Port Richmond, Staten Island, for three years service under the command of Colonel Thomas Donnelly Doubleday. The regiment was designated as the 1st New York Heavy Artillery on January 27, 1862, and soon renamed 4th New York Heavy Artillery on February 8, 1862. Four batteries from the 11th New York Heavy Artillery were assigned to the regiment on July 25, 1863, as Batteries I, K, L, and M.

Battery A – mustered in November 1861
Battery B – mustered in November 1861
Battery C – mustered in December 1861
Battery D – mustered in January 1862
Battery E – mustered in February 1862
Battery F – mustered in February 1862
Battery G – mustered in January 1862
Battery H – mustered in January 1862

The regiment was attached to Military District of Washington to May 1862. Whipple's Command, Military District of Washington, to October 1862. Abercrombie's Division, Defenses of Washington, to February 1863. Abercrombie's Division, XXII Corps, Department of Washington, to April. 1st Brigade, DeRussy's Division, XXII Corps, to May 1863. 4th Brigade, DeRussy's Division, XXII Corps, to December 1863. 3rd Brigade, DeRussy's Division, XXII Corps, to March 1864. Artillery Brigade, VI Corps, Army of the Potomac, to May 1864 (consisting of Batteries C, D, L, and M, organized as 1st Battalion). Artillery Brigade, V Corps, to May 1864 (consisting of Batteries E, F, H, and K organized as 2nd Battalion). Artillery Brigade, II Corps, to May 1864 (consisting of Batteries A, B, G, and I organized as 3rd Battalion). Artillery Brigade, II Corps, May 31 to June 25, 1864. 1st Brigade, 3rd Division, II Corps (1st Battalion). 2nd Brigade, 3rd Division, II Corps (2nd Battalion), June 25 to July 13, 1864. Artillery Reserve to August 1864. Unattached, 1st Division, II Corps, to September 1864. 4th Brigade, 1st Division, II Corps, to March 1865. 2nd Brigade, 1st Division, II Corps, to June 1865. 3rd Brigade, DeRussy's Division, XXII Corps, to August 1865. 2nd Brigade, Department of Washington, to September 1865. Battery I with Artillery Brigade, II Corps, July to December 1864. Battery L with Artillery Brigade, II Corps, July 1864, to March 1865. Battery C with Artillery Brigade, II Corps, October 1864 to May 1865.

The 4th New York Heavy Artillery mustered out of the service at Washington, D.C., on September 29, 1865.

== Detailed service ==
Left New York for Washington, D.C., February 10, 1862. Duty in the defenses of Washington, D. C., until March 1864. Action at Lewinsville, Va., July 6, 1862, and October 1, 1863 (detachment). Rapidan Campaign May–June, 1864. Battles of the Wilderness May 5–7, Spotsylvania May 8–12, Piney Branch Church May 8 (2nd Battalion), Laurel Hill May 10 (3rd Battalion), Spotsylvania Court House May 12–21, Landron's Farm May 18 (1st Battalion), North Anna River May 23–26. On line of the Totopotomoy May 28–31. Cold Harbor June 1–12. Before Petersburg June 16–18. Siege of Petersburg June 16, 1864, to April 2, 1865. Jerusalem Plank Road, Weldon Railroad, June 22–23, 1864. Deep Bottom July 27–28. Mine Explosion, Petersburg, July 30 (reserve). Strawberry Plains, Deep Bottom, August 14–18. Ream's Station August 25. Poplar Springs Church, Peeble's Farm, September 29-October 2. Boydton Plank Road, Hatcher's Run, October 27–28. Reconnaissance to Hatcher's Run December 9–10. Dabney's Mills, Hatcher's Run, February 5–7, 1865. Watkin's House March 25. Appomattox Campaign March 28-April 9. Hatcher's Run or Boydton Road and White Oak Road March 31. Sutherland Station and fall of Petersburg April 2. Pursuit of Lee April 3–9. Amelia Springs April 5. Sailor's Creek April 6. Farmville April 7. Appomattox Court House April 9. Surrender of Lee and his army. March to Washington, D.C., May 2–12. Grand Review of the Armies May 23. Duty in the defenses of Washington until September.

== Casualties ==
The regiment lost as a total of 454 men during service; eight officers and 108 enlisted men killed or mortally wounded, four officers and 343 enlisted men died of disease.

== Commanders ==
- Colonel Thomas Donnelly Doubleday – resigned, March 1863
- Colonel Henry H. Hall – resigned, August 1863
- Colonel John Caldwell Tidball

== Notable members ==
- 2nd Lieutenant Stephen Potter Corliss, Battery F – Medal of Honor recipient for action at the Second Battle of Ream's Station
- Private Allen Thompson, Battery I – Medal of Honor recipient for action at the Battle of White Oak Road
- Private James Thompson, Battery K – Medal of Honor recipient for action at the Battle of White Oak Road

== See also ==
- List of New York Civil War regiments
- New York in the American Civil War
