= Mirin Dajo =

Dutch mystic and extreme body piercing performer

- Promotional photograph of Mirin Dajo showing a foil piercing his thorax from back to front
- Born: Arnold Gerrit Henskes; 6 August 1912; Rotterdam, the Netherlands
- Died: 26 May 1948 (aged 35); Winterthur, Switzerland
- Occupation: Entertainer
- Known for: Body piercing

Arnold Gerrit Henskes (6 August 1912 – 26 May 1948), known by the pseudonym Mirin Dajo, was a Dutch performer. He became famous for radically piercing his body with all kinds of objects apparently without injury, even surprising the medical community at the time.

== Early life ==
Born in Rotterdam, Henskes claimed to have had strange dreams and "paranormal" experiences during his youth. He would go on to start a career in the Beaux Arts, heading a design firm in his twenties. When he turned 33, he claimed to realise that his body was "invulnerable". As a result he left his job and went to Amsterdam. Later he would claim to have made money by letting people pierce his body with "dagger-like objects", as well as swallowing glass and razor blades.

== Career ==
Promotional photo showing Mirin Dajo jogging with a foil through his abdomen.

Notorious for his radical "body piercings", Dajo also considered an esoteric lecture a vital part of his performance. As he saw it people should abandon the materialistic world view and accept there was a higher force, "the Source". Dajo claimed that a God was using him, through his invulnerability, to show us there was something better out there. His conviction was that materialism only resulted in misery and war.

At that time he adopted his stage name Mirin Dajo, which is based on the Esperanto noun mirindaĵo meaning "wonder". He saw the use of Esperanto – one language to be used around the world – as a way of uniting mankind. Because he needed a license to perform in public he was taken to Professor Carp, Dr. Bertholt and Dr. Stokvis of the University of Leiden. His act was allowed but not his lecture.

Although not as widely documented as his sword piercing feats, Dajo claimed that his invulnerability had been proven by numerous means. In an interview in Time magazine, he also declared his invulnerability having been tested with burning irons, boiling water, and having been shot through the head from half a yard distance on two occasions. He supported this by exhibiting two scars allegedly from the shots, one in the centre of the forehead and the other above his right eye, however, his autopsy showed no traces of any injuries to the head.

== Death ==
X-ray of his abdomen on May 12, 1948, showing the needle he swallowed

In 1947, Dajo moved to Switzerland and initially was only granted a license to perform without the ability to speak to the public. In his performances Dajo used several assistants but, after many disappointments, he paired up with Jan Dirk de Groot who was his Dutch neighbour. According to De Groot, Dajo had several guardian angels, was telepathic, and could heal people. Time magazine reported on an appearance at the Corso variety theatre in Zurich. The article alleged "that Dajo had 'proved' to Zurich doctors that his act was not based on fakery."

On May 11, 1948, Dajo alleged that he was instructed by voices to eat a steel needle. It was surgically removed on May 13, 1948. He would need to spend much time recovering in the hospital, and to demonstrate his health he walked through Zurich directly after being released. Ten days later, when De Groot picked up his wife from the airport, Dajo lay down on a bed and went into a trance-like state. On arrival De Groot's wife was not comfortable with someone lying down as if dead, and asked De Groot to check his health. On the third day De Groot's wife asked him to check again, only this time his neck felt cold. The medical examiner announced he had been dead for a day. He was claimed to have died from an aortic rupture.

== Books ==
- Egloff, Traugott; Wagner, Willy (1949). Mirin Dajo. Leben, Glaube, Tod, Klärungsversuch [Mirin Dajo: Life, Faith, Death, An Attempt at Clarification] (in German). Furttal-Verlag. OCLC 18607977.
- de Groot, Jan (2003). De onkwetsbare profeet. Het Nederlandse fenomeen Mirin Dajo [The Invulnerable Prophet. The Dutch Phenomenon Mirin Dajo] (in German). ISBN 90-806700-6-5.
- Bürgin, Luc (2004). Das Wunder Mirin Dajo [The Miracle Mirin Dajo] (in German). ISBN 3-930219-74-3.
- Bürgin, Luc (2022). Das letzte geheimnis von Mirin Dajo [The Last Secret of Mirin Dajo] (in German). ISBN 978-3-86445-883-5.
