= Ulysses Doubleday (general) =

Union Army general

- Born: August 31, 1824; Auburn, New York
- Died: February 11, 1893 (aged 68); Tryon, North Carolina
- Burial place: Woodlawn Cemetery, New York
- Relatives: Ulysses F. Doubleday (father); Abner Doubleday (brother); Thomas D. Doubleday (brother)
- Military career
- Allegiance: United States of America
- Branch: Union Army
- Service years: 1862–1865
- Rank: Colonel; Brevet Brigadier General
- Units: 4th New York Heavy Artillery; 3rd U.S.C.T. Infantry
- Commands: 45th U.S.C.T. Infantry
- Other work: banker, broker

Ulysses Doubleday (August 31, 1824 – February 11, 1893) was a Union Army colonel during the American Civil War. In 1866 he was nominated and confirmed for appointment to the grade of brevet brigadier general of volunteers, to rank from March 13, 1865.

== Early life ==
Ulysses Doubleday was born in Auburn, New York, on August 31, 1824. He was described as having 'blue eyes, brown hair, and a fair complexion'. He was the younger brother of Union Army Major General Abner Doubleday, and the son of congressman and War of 1812 veteran Ulysses F. Doubleday and Hester Donnelly. Before the Civil War, he was a banker and broker.

== Civil War ==
On January 23, 1862, Ulysses Doubleday was appointed a major and commander of the 4th New York Heavy Artillery. He became an aide-de-camp for his brother in August 1862. He was discharged on March 7, 1863. He returned to service as lieutenant colonel of the 3rd United States Colored Infantry Regiment, October 2, 1863. He was appointed to the command of the Artillery Brigade in the District of Florida, Department of the South, in April 1864. He resigned October 5, 1864 and was appointed colonel of the 45th United States Colored Infantry Regiment, October 8, 1864. He immediately took command of the Second Brigade, Third Division, X Corps (Union Army), Army of the James and served in that office until December 3, 1864 except for October 29–November 6. On December 3, 1864, Doubleday took command of Second Brigade, Second Division, XXV Corps (Union Army), Army of the James until May 18, 1865. Doubleday's brigade was one of two brigades of United States Colored Troops that actively participated in surrounding Confederate forces at Appomattox Court House and was instrumental in the Union victory. Doubleday's brigade was attached to the First Division, 24th Corps between April 7 and April 9, 1865 and was present for the surrender of the Army of Northern Virginia. He relocated with his brigade to the Department of Texas from June 13, 1865 until some date in July 1865. He was discharged from the volunteers on September 12, 1865.

== Post-War ==
On January 13, 1866, President Andrew Johnson nominated Doubleday for appointment to the grade of brevet brigadier general of volunteers, to rank from March 13, 1865, and the United States Senate confirmed the appointment on March 12, 1866.

After the war he was a member of the New York Stock Exchange, the Union League, and the Saint Nicholas Society of New York. He later retired to a large farm in Asheville, North Carolina.

Ulysses Doubleday died in Tryon, North Carolina on February 11, 1893. He was interred at Woodlawn Cemetery (Bronx, New York).

== See also ==
- List of American Civil War brevet generals (Union)
