= Ulysses F. Doubleday =

American politician

Member of the U.S. House of Representatives from New York's 24th district
- In office March 4, 1835 – March 3, 1837
- Preceded by: Rowland Day
- Succeeded by: William H. Noble
- In office March 4, 1831 – March 3, 1833
- Preceded by: Gershom Powers
- Succeeded by: Rowland Day

Personal details
- Born: Ulysses Freeman Doubleday; December 15, 1792 Otsego County, New York
- Died: March 11, 1866 (aged 73) Bloomington, Illinois
- Resting place: Old City Cemetery, Bloomington, Illinois
- Party: Jacksonian
- Spouse: Hester Donnelly
- Children: 4

Military service
- Allegiance: United States
- Branch/service: United States Army
- Battles/wars: War of 1812

Ulysses Freeman Doubleday (December 15, 1792 – March 11, 1866) was an American politician who served two terms as a U.S. representative from New York from 1831 to 1833, and from 1835 to 1837.

He was also a newspaper publisher, a book publisher, printer, a veteran of the War of 1812, a merchant, and farmer.

== Biography ==
Born in Otsego County, New York, Doubleday received a limited formal schooling. While living in Cooperstown he was apprenticed to the village printer at a very young age. Apprentices were legally bound to work for many years with little or no rights but with a chance to learn a useful trade.

=== Family ===
Ulysses was near the last of 27 Doubleday children. His father Abner Doubleday was a farmer and Revolutionary War soldier. His mother Mercy Freeman was a preacher's daughter. He learned the art of printing and worked as a printer in Cooperstown, Utica, and Albany, New York.

He served at Sackets Harbor in the War of 1812. He established the Saratoga Courier at Ballston Spa.

=== Publisher ===
He was a book publisher under the name UF Doubleday printing leather bound books starting in 1817. He published the following books. Samuel Young's Treatise on Internal Navigation, 1817 (with parts written by Albert Galatin), Gilbert McMaster's An Apology for the Book of Psalms, 1818 and William Ray's Poems on Various Subjects, 1821. A Brief Account of the Construction, Management, & Discipline &c. &c. of the New-York State Prison at Auburn, together with a Compendium of Criminal Law by Powers, Gershom. 1826 Auburn. Other books printed by Doubleday are Almanacs from 1820 to 1827, school books on Geography and Reading, pamphlets religious and civic organizations.

He moved to Auburn, New York, where he published and edited the newspaper Cayuga Patriot 1819–1839. He ran a stationery store in Auburn called Doubleday's.

The town of Auburn benefited from the Erie Canal and became the 3rd largest city in New York State.

=== Congress ===
Doubleday was elected as a Jacksonian to the Twenty-second Congress (March 4, 1831 – March 3, 1833).

He was appointed inspector and warden of Auburn Prison in 1834. As warden he abolished cold water punishment of prisoners. In May 1834 he helped charter the Auburn and Syracuse Railroad.

Doubleday was elected to the Twenty-fourth Congress (March 4, 1835 – March 3, 1837).

=== Later career ===
He engaged in agricultural pursuits in Scipio, New York from 1837 to 1846. He moved to New York City and engaged in mercantile pursuits 1846–1860.

=== Death and burial ===
He died on March 11, 1866, in Bloomington, Illinois. He was interred in the Bloomington Township Old City Cemetery, Bloomington, Illinois. He currently rests at Evergreen Cemetery in Bloomington, Illinois.

=== Family ===
He married Hester Donnelly and they were parents of Thomas D. Doubleday, Major General Abner Doubleday, Brevet Brigadier General Ulysses Doubleday and Jane Ann Doubleday (March 5, 1830 – June 12, 1843).

U.S. House of Representatives
Preceded by Gershom Powers	Member of the U.S. House of Representatives from New York's 24th congressional district March 4, 1831 – March 3, 1833	Succeeded by Rowland Day
Preceded by Rowland Day	Member of the U.S. House of Representatives from New York's 24th congressional district March 4, 1835 – March 3, 1837	Succeeded by William H. Noble
