= Skepter =

Dutch skeptical popular science magazine

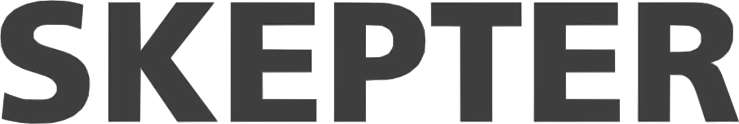
- "De kritische kijk op paranormale verschijnselen en pseudowetenschap"
- Editor-in-chief: Marcel Hulspas (1988–2002); Rob Nanninga (2002–2014); Hans van Maanen (2014–)
- Categories: Scientific skepticism
- Frequency: Quarterly (1988–2006) Semi-annually (2007–present)
- Circulation: 2900 (2300 paid)
- Publisher: Stichting Skepsis
- First issue: March 1, 1988
- Country: Netherlands
- Language: Dutch
- Website: skepsis.nl/tijdschrift-skepter/
- ISSN: 0921-5085

Skepter is a popular science magazine of the Dutch skeptical foundation Stichting Skepsis. It describes paranormal or controversial theories and methods from a skeptical perspective.

== History ==
Skepter logo 1988–2014.

In its first issue, the contemporary president of Stichting Skepsis, astronomer Cornelis de Jager, wrote that the paper "could fulfill a useful task in explaining many seemingly miraculous things, and consequently to the clarification of the misconceptions that exist in many people's minds. Education of a hopefully large audience is the first and foremost task of our magazine." From 1988 until 2002, astronomer Marcel Hulspas was editor-in-chief, and when he was succeeded by Rob Nanninga, the magazine first appeared in colour. In 2007, to reduce costs, increase accessibility and facilitate production and distribution, Skepter has been concentrated more and more on the Internet. In that year, the frequency of Skepter was reduced from quarterly to semi-annually. On the other hand, its size grew from 20 pages per issue in 1988 to 48 in 2014. During Nanninga's editorship (2002–2014), the number of subscribers increased from about 1500 to 2200.

After Nanninga's death in May 2014, he was succeeded as editor-in-chief by science journalist Hans van Maanen in December. The layout was revamped, and since 2016 Skepter has been issued four times a year again, as was the case before 2007. Since September 2017, the staff consists of editor-in-chief Hans van Maanen and editors Pepijn van Erp and CSI fellow Jan Willem Nienhuys. The paid circulation is more than 2300, the total circulation is at 2900.

== Contents ==
The magazine deals with topics such as alternative medicine, magic and the paranormal. Examples include medical claims in reflexology, 9/11 conspiracy theories, tidal forces, the hype surrounding the popular book The Secret, forged doctorates from non-existent universities, the "ridiculous" verdict by an Amsterdam judge that the Vereniging tegen de Kwakzalverij could not label orthomanual therapist M. Sickesz a "quack" (later overturned), iridology, Bach flower remedies, ayurveda, Aqua Detox, magnet therapy applied kinesiology, bioresonance therapy, acupuncture and reiki. Moreover, attention is given to clairvoyance, parapsychology, auras and dowsing, but also to Egyptian pyramids, aliens, crop circles and UFOs. Although Nanninga said that practices such as forging doctorates are a disgrace, he emphasised that (writing about) critical thinking can be interesting.

== See also ==
- Critical thinking
- Freethought
