= Rob Nanninga =

Dutch skeptic (1955–2014)

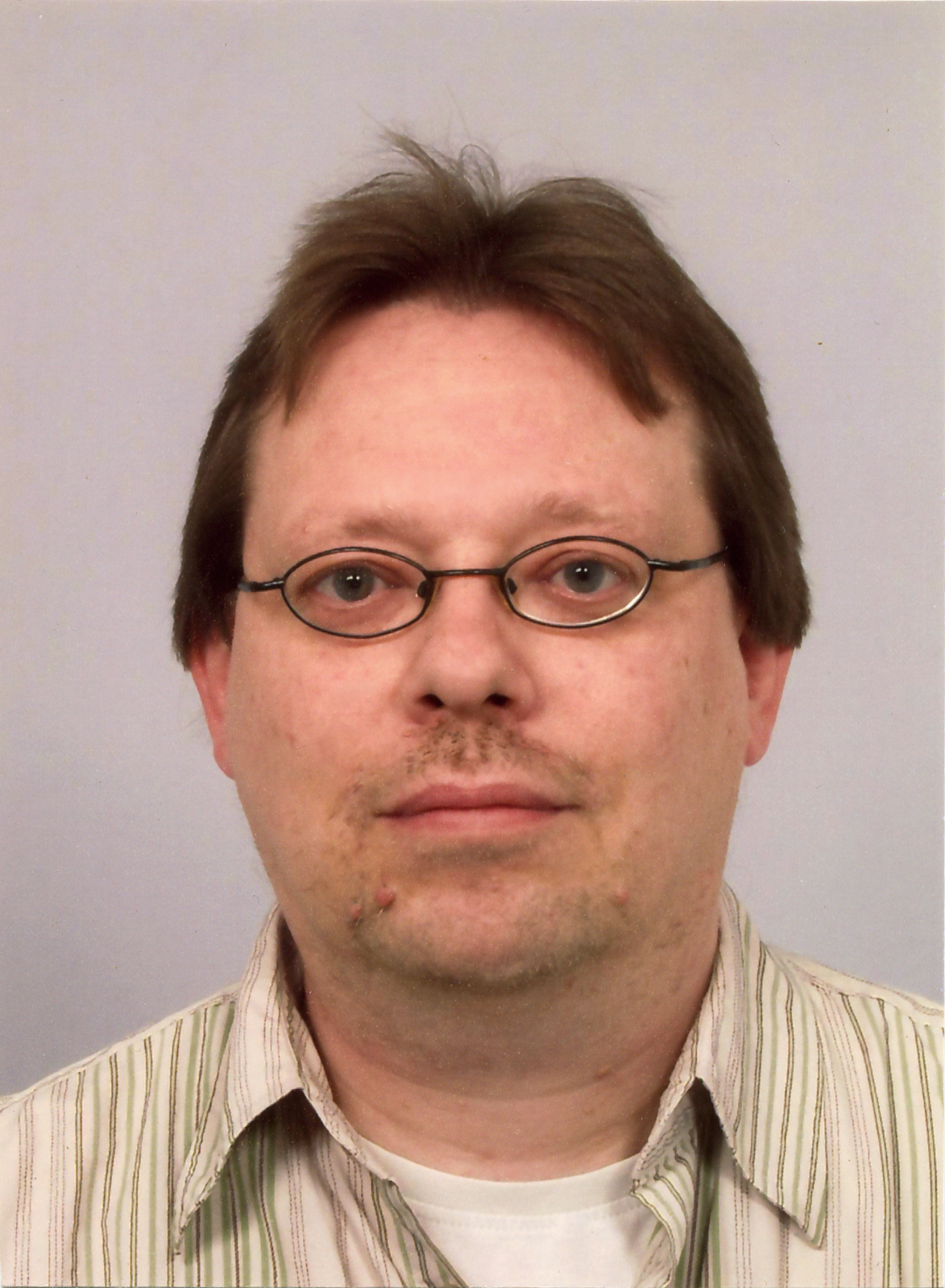
- Born: Roelof Hendrik Nanninga; 6 August 1955; Groningen, Netherlands
- Died: 30 May 2014 (aged 58); Groningen, Netherlands
- Education: Ubbo Emmius
- Occupations: Writer, editor
- Partner: Jolanda Hennekam
- Writing career
- Language: Dutch
- Years active: 1987–2014
- Genre: non-fiction
- Subject: Scientific skepticism
- Notable work: Parariteiten (1988)

Roelof Hendrik "Rob" Nanninga (6 August 1955 – 30 May 2014) was a Dutch skeptic, writer, board member of Stichting Skepsis and editor of its magazine Skepter. He became known for his critical writings about sects, alternative healers and therapists, paranormal claims and pseudoscientific trainings and courses.

== Early career ==
Nanninga completed his Ubbo Emmius teacher education in the summer of 1980 as a high school teacher in Dutch and English. After only a month in military service he was discharged. Nanninga was a teacher for only a short time, being unable to keep order in class; his East Groningen pupils wanted no part of his Skinnerian ideas about rewarding and not punishing. He concluded educating rebellious teenagers was not for him.

== First skeptical activities ==
In 1976, Nanninga got involved in a skeptics discussion group in Groningen via a school project of the college. He told them he knew how Uri Geller bent spoons. In the same year, the American skeptical organisation Committee for the Scientific Investigation of Claims of the Paranormal (CSICOP) was founded; its magazine Skeptical Inquirer also attracted several subscribers in the Netherlands. Around 1979 Nanninga's interest in sects grew, and he visited several of them with his working group "Opkomende religies" ("Emerging religions"). It was in this club that he met his girlfriend Jolanda Hennekam.

In the early 1980s, Nanninga performed an experiment with a Transcendental Meditation follower, who claimed to be able to make a floating jump of over a metre, starting from a meditation position and without pushing off the ground. Nanninga requested him to jump from a plywood plate that was lying on marbles onto a mattress half a metre away. The test subject, who beforehand claimed that the meditation gave him a "flying feeling", was confronted with the hard truth that one cannot push oneself off of a rolling plate.

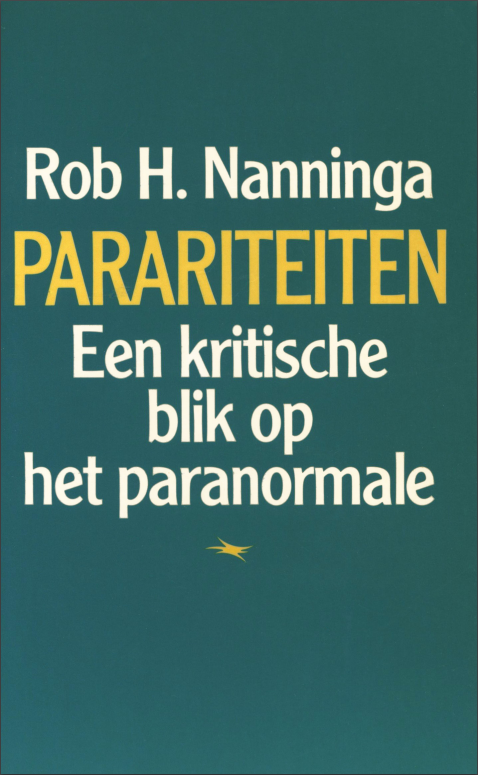
Rob Nanninga's book "Paranormal Oddities – A Critical View of the Paranormal", published in 1988.

At the end of 1987, Rob Nanninga was among 25 Dutch Skeptical Inquirer subscribers who convened at the Humanistisch Verbond in Utrecht, with Paul Kurtz present, to found a CSICOP-like organisation in the Netherlands, which led to Stichting Skepsis. Nanninga got involved in its formation because he was writing his book Parariteiten – Een kritische blik op het paranormale ("Paranormal Oddities – A Critical View of the Paranormal") at the time, which was published the next year. At that convention he met many of his later colleagues such as mathematician Jan Willem Nienhuys and astronomer Cornelis de Jager, who became chairman. Nanninga himself became secretary from the end of 1988 until 2003. On 1 March 1988, the first issue of Skepsis' magazine Skepter came out, of which Nanninga became an editor, becoming its editor-in-chief in 2002 until his death.

== Skepsis and Skepter ==
=== Moget case ===
In December 1994, Nanninga was tipped off by an ex-employee of the Groningen-based Instituut voor Video-Gestalttherapie (Institute for Video Gestalt therapy, IVG), where victims of incest were referred to by the Municipal Health Service (GGD) and Social service (that subsidised the IVG for thousands of guilders). The IVG was allegedly being run like a sect. Nanninga then spoke to several former clients, students and therapists of the IVG, after which he sent a report with his findings to the director of the social service and the chief inspector of Healthcare in January 1995. After coming up against a brick wall with them, he decided to seek publicity to the press.

On 3 March 1995 Nanninga wrote a piece full of fierce accusations against the institute in Intermediair. The core of his charge against the IVG was its leader Wies Moget, whom he described as a 'paranoid and ruthless woman', who claimed to help victims, as long as they did exactly what she told them. Nanninga exposed how Moget told them all kinds of fantastic stories that were highly questionable. According to Moget, she and her daughters had undergone horrible mistreatment at the hands of an obscure cabal that she referred to as "The Group" ("De Groep"). This allegedly consisted of so-called 'satanic' figures, including her ex-husband that supposedly were after them. Through her therapy, they armed themselves against them. From 1991 on, Moget recruited students from among her own clients for her expensive training to become therapists. With her 'sect' in the city centre of Groningen she 'terrorised the neighbourhood', on the one hand by manipulating her own coworkers with threats and drumming into their minds that they had been the victims of various "repressed" crimes in the past, including sexual and ritual abuse. On the other hand, she identified certain people, sometimes among her own students, as members of "The Group". With her stories, Moget managed to have her adepts break their ties with friends and relatives, and become dependent upon herself. Participants who protested were subjected to hypnosis sessions by Moget, or expelled when they became too dangerous for the IVG's stability.

After the publication of Nanninga's piece, the GGD and social service decided not to refer new clients to the IVG for the time being, and several more ex-students came out with complaints. In a new article in the newspaper Trouw of 18 March, Nanninga provided new evidence from a series of former clients and employees. Because of the commotion, the IVG decided to set up a self-appointed commission to investigate potential abuses (the Inspection for Healthcare refused to investigate the matter because it did not recognise the institute), but Moget's new boyfriend and spokesman Vincent Schochron declared beforehand in the very same statement that the institute, having dozens of clients at the time, did 'nothing wrong'. Moreover, Moget sued Nanninga for defamation and slander, demanding financial compensation for causing "material and immaterial damage" to the institute. The court in Groningen rejected the demand on 15 December 1995, because it concluded Skepsis had not been unnecessarily offensive or grievous, and Nanninga had backed up all of his claims well. Moget had to pay for the legal costs. After that it became quiet surrounding the IVG; the authorities did not undertake any action, despite attempts by ex-students to have it shut down.

=== Crop circles, UFOs and aliens ===
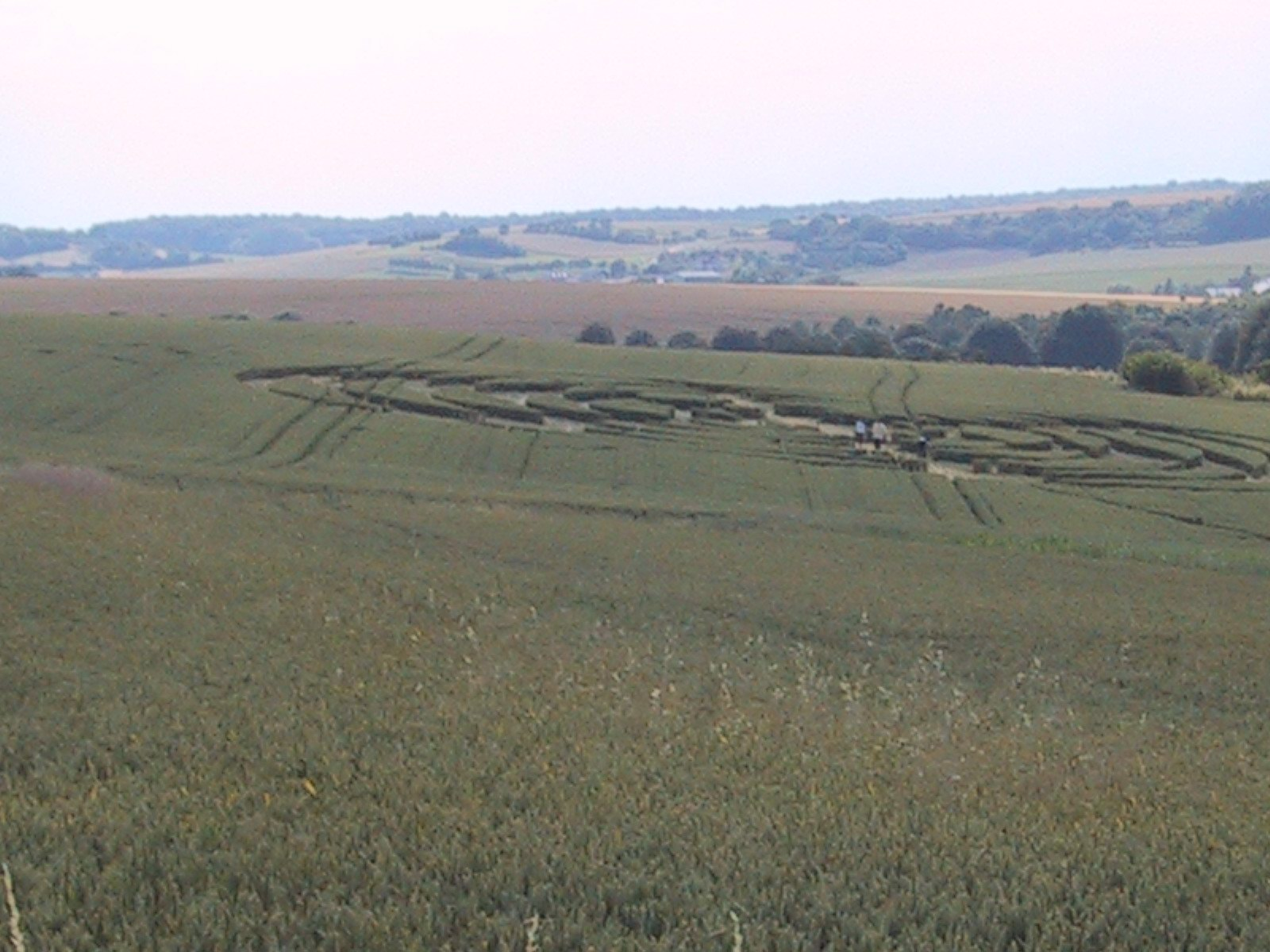
A 2004 fake crop circle made by Südwestrundfunk near Bedersdorf, Germany. By 1999, Nanninga concluded crop circles were probably all man-made.

Around the turn of the millennium, a wave of pseudoscientific interest for extraterrestrial life and its supposed connection to crop circles and UFOs kept Nanninga and his colleagues (especially Marcel Hulspas) busy. Several times Nanninga explained in Skepter and to the press that the evidence provided by ufologists for their claims was slight and inconsistent. "Some interpret the circles as a cry of distress from Mother Earth, while others connect them to aliens that radiate the crop fields from their UFOs. According to dowsers, they have something to do with paranormal powerlines that lie across the landscape. Haselhoff has not yet made a choice out of these confused theories." The standard argument went that crop circles would be "too complex" to be man-made and thus had to be of alien manufacture, even when people stepped forward confessing they had created them, including video footage of them doing so.

Nanninga also found it 'a ridiculous theory' that some women claimed to be impregnated by aliens to produce children: "Wouldn't those beings be better off raiding a sperm bank?" He emphasised that he thought that people who believe such things are not crazy, but simply possess a richer imagination that they sometimes confuse with reality. He pointed out that in the case of crop circles it turned out to be man-made jokers looking for sensation every time. Skepsis published a manual on its website on how to make crop circles yourself. In the summer of 1999, Nanninga concluded that crop circles had been shown to be hoaxes so many times and that their popularity was clearly waning, and that further serious investigation had become unnecessary, although he could see a future for it in art.

In April 1997, Nanninga investigated and described the rise and fall of the American Christian-ufological Heaven's Gate sect, and what had driven its members to commit cult suicide.

=== Parapsychology ===
In 2001 Nanninga said that parapsychological research should be taken seriously, because a meta-analysis of ganzfeld experiments showed a positive result that could not be explained by chance alone, although he did not conclude anything yet. Later he said he had become "a bit more reflective" when it turned out that statistical errors were often being made, the results were not well repeatable, and "the whole narrative is shaky". He remained open-minded for parapsychology and would accept facts if they were convincing, but ascertained that researchers in this field were mainly interested in persuading their following, and not the outside world.

In 1994, Nanninga wrote an exposé about hypnotist Rasti Rostelli –who amongst other things claimed to master telekinesis–, and during a 2001 episode of the television show Het zwarte schaap ("The Black Sheep"), Nanninga demonstrated that Rostelli was actually using well-known (and sometimes dangerous) magic tricks without openly admitting to it, thus misleading his audience. On behalf of Skepsis, Nanninga offered him 10,000 guilders to prove without tricks he had paranormal powers, but Rostelli refused.

=== Homeopathic challenge ===
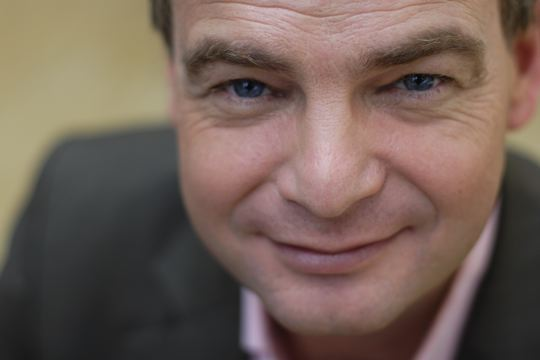
When Health Minister Hoogervorst alleged that homeopathy was 'just water', homeopaths challenged him to take an overdose. Nanninga offered to conduct an experiment in his stead.

After the remarks of the Dutch Minister of Health Hans Hoogervorst on 18 February 2004 that homeopathy is 'just water', and that following the KNMG report on the death of Sylvia Millecam, he intended to henceforth legally prohibit anyone but physicians from medically diagnosing patients, homeopaths reacted furiously. In de Volkskrant of 21 February 2004, spokesman Michiel van Gemert of the Dutch Association of Classical Homeopaths (NVKH) challenged the Minister and the chief inspector of Healthcare Herre Kingma (also a member of the Vereniging tegen de Kwakzalverij) to take an overdose of homeopathically prepared sulphur (three weeks of C200 drops), but they refused. Thereupon Nanninga offered on behalf of Skepsis to take up the challenge and perform the experiment together with Van Gemert, who claimed it would lead to 'unbearable itching and heating'. The response of the NVKH was positive, and on 25 February they jointly declared that they would perform an experiment with forty people in favour of and forty people against homeopathy. Van Gemert was so enthusiastic that he promised to quit his practice if he turned out to be wrong. Two weeks later however, Van Gemert reported that, after consulting his supporters, they would abandon the test, because it was supposedly not designed well statistically, and one should not test a medicine if one knows in advance what effects are to expected. Nanninga again repeated the rules that had been mutually agreed upon, and clarified the conditions that should indicate that the test results would be reliable, and remained open for the challenge, but warned the NVKH that it should retract its claims against Minister Hoogervorst if it pulled out definitively. It appeared that Van Gemert was personally in favour of the test, but met with resistance from the association. In the end the test was not carried out, nor did the NVKH retract its statements.

=== Exposing Van den Broeke ===
In 2005, Nanninga exposed the self-proclaimed psychic Robbert van den Broeke, who in the RTL 4 TV show Er is zoveel meer ("There is so much more") claimed to be able to paranormally contact the ancestors of people present, but had actually drawn his information directly from a genealogy website, including a linguistic error that he had copied: genverbrander instead of geneverbrander, an old-fashioned spelling of jeneverbrander, literally translating in "gene burner", but meant was "gin burner". Robbert van den Broeke clearly didn't know what was meant by this "occupation" and had just cited it from the results of his internet search In the episode of 18 December (seen by about 800,000 people), Van den Broeke talked to a woman, Corrie, whose husband Arno had unexpectedly committed suicide. The psychic sought contact with Arno and ended his story with the text:

"There is something very important I have yet to tell. Arno and you also know each other from a previous life. You are very closely connected to each other. Maybe you have felt it yourself already, but it is true. And I need to say something about that. It is important, also to cope with this, to let go of this. There is a date coming through. 1793 and 1823. You have lived during the time in between. In that life you didn't get very old. 30 years or something. I'm getting a story right now. It was in the Netherlands. I'm reading Coevorden. Your name was Hillegien. You were called Hillegien. Hellegien. Hillegien, I hear. Hillegien. I'm getting a surname through about you. Possibly something like Rozenboom or Rozeboom. You were called Rozeboom back then. And you already lived together with, there is a name clearly coming through, something like Luwert, Luwert, that's the name I hear. And there is something with 7 March. And there is something about 7 August in that life. So I've got a feeling that you have actually lived with this partner in that life. Shortly after the wedding in that life, you died. In the same year. You married then, and in fact in the same year, I've got a hunch in August, you passed away. Your husband was then doing, or something with... I'm getting a profession. Trapper or trap... I don't know what that means. Trapper or genverbrander or genverbranden. I don't know exactly what that means."

However, Nanninga noticed that most of this information could be found precisely on the Internet. A Google search took him to a website that contained the family tree of this Hillegien Rozeboom. Especially the word genverbrander caught his attention, because this should have been geneverbrander (=jeneverbrander), but was misspelled. The same spelling error could be found on the genealogy website, where the rest of the information he recited ("channeled") on the show was as well. Van den Broeke made several more mistakes during the "reading": for example, he "channeled" the wrong birthdate: 7 instead of 17 August, and he spoke of the name "Luwert" instead of "Lubbert". On 29 December, RTL said it still believed in the self-proclaimed medium, while Van den Broeke stood up for himself, claiming that "Heaven above" had revealed to him that Er is zoveel meer would be continued with a new series of episodes. However, RTL boss Fons van Westerloo decided differently: RTL 4 spokeswoman Karin Bouwknegt declared in February 2006 that they were "finished with Robbert" because of all the commotion, because they did "not want any more negative publicity". Journalist Albert Verlinde mockingly commented that Van den Broeke, who was "not a goochelaar ("magician") but a googlelaar ("googler")", could not even predict his own future; moreover, Verlinde supported Nanninga's allegation that RTL 4 found viewer ratings more important than honesty.

=== Facilitated Communication ===
Back in 2006, Nanninga had written an article that was critical about Facilitated Communication (FC), with which handicapped people could allegedly speak by pointing out letters on a board, guided by a helping hand. According to him, these 'helping hands' were in fact doing all the work, even though they did not realise this themselves. When the heavily handicapped girl Thiandi Grooff caught media attention in 2010, allegedly because she could go to college thanks to FC, Nanninga was skeptical, and was the first to raise doubts about the uncritical stories going around praising Facilitated Communication for 'helping' Thiandi.

=== Other interests ===
Nanninga was also critical of astrology, acupuncture, deprogramming, the "occult" personality course Human Dynamics, The Next Uri Geller, Het Zesde Zintuig, endtime predictions because of the supposed Maya calendar's end in 2012 and pseudoscientific HRM methods such as the enneagram. For a brief period of time, Nanninga was also an editor at the magazine Religie Nu ("Religion Now") (October 1997 – September 1998), meant as the continuation of the semi-annual magazine Religieuze bewegingen in Nederland ("Religious movements in the Netherlands"). However it only reached a circulation of 300, and was soon discontinued.

== Personal life ==
His friend Jan Willem Nienhuys called Nanninga "a true loner", who disliked crowds, and there are few pictures of him. Although Nanninga took little pleasure in publicity, he did participate in several radio and television programmes such as 747Live, Hoe?Zo! Radio, Het zwarte schaap, De week van... and Gebeurtenissen. From 2004 on, he no longer attended congresses and lectures, and instead preferred to read books, articulating his thoughts through his writing. He was found dead sitting behind his computer on 30 May 2014; the diagnosis was cardiac arrest.

== Work ==
- Parariteiten – een kritische blik op het paranormale. (Utrecht 1988). Het Spectrum ISBN 9027419957. Freely available online since 2016.
