= Catherine de Jong =

Dutch medical doctor and skeptic (born 1956)

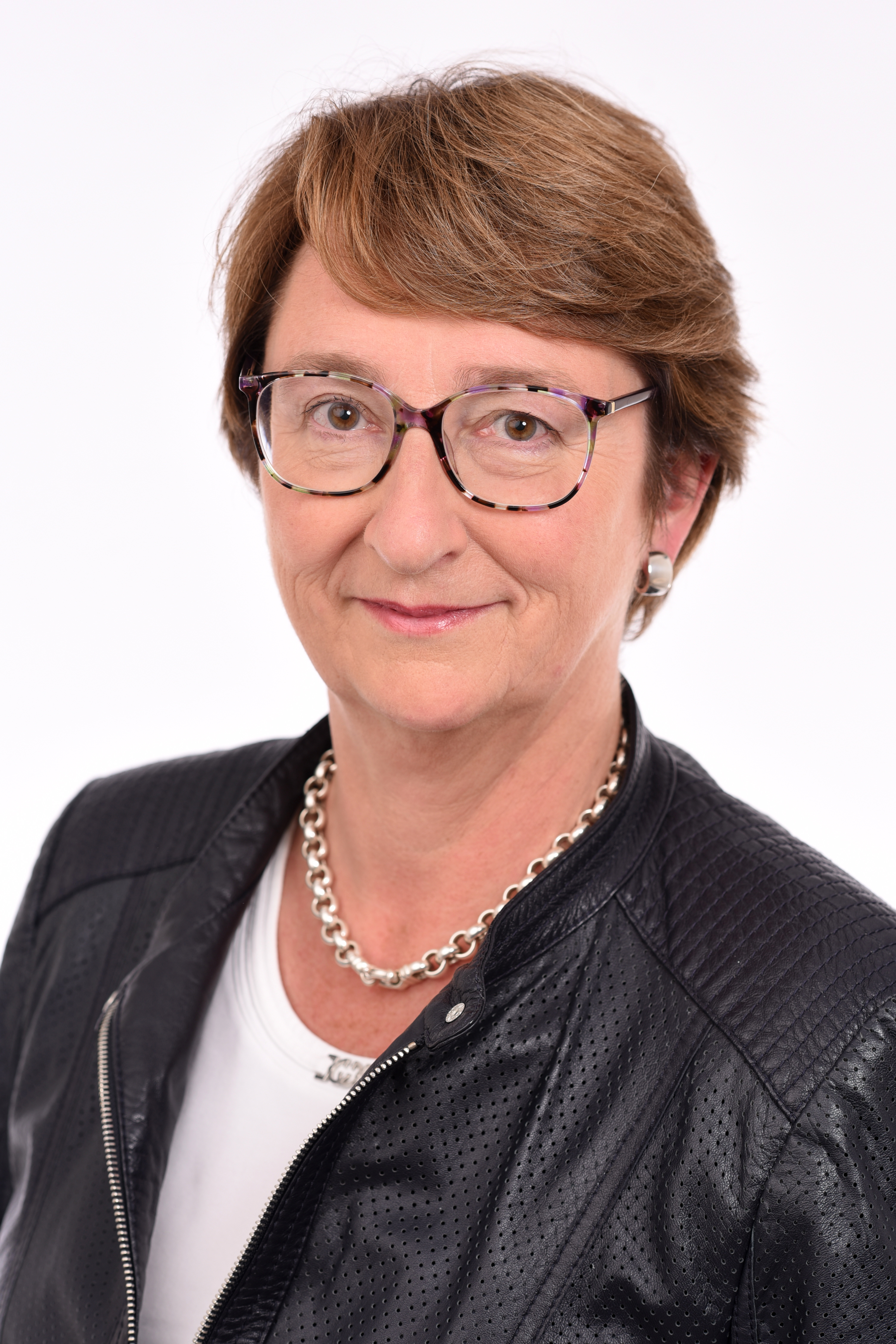
- de Jong, 2019.
- Born: 1956 (age 69–70); Leiden, Netherlands
- Education: University of Groningen
- Occupations: Anesthesiologist, skeptical activist
- Known for: Chairing the Vereniging tegen de Kwakzalverij
- Spouse: Frans Klein
- Children: 2
- Catherine de Jong's voice Recorded October 2014

Catharina Jantina (Catherine) de Jong (born 1956) is a Dutch anesthesiologist, drug rehab physician, intensivist, since 2009 board member of the Vereniging tegen de Kwakzalverij (VtdK), between 2011–2015 as chair, and board member of the European Council of Skeptical Organisations (ECSO).

== Biography ==
=== Education and career ===
In 1975, De Jong began studying law, but did not complete it. From 1977 until 1987, she studied medicine in Groningen, subsequently taking a course on anesthesiology in Sheffield in 1988. Thereafter she specialised in anesthesiology at the University Medical Center Groningen from 1989 until 1994, finally completing her education as an intensivist at the Onze Lieve Vrouwe Gasthuis in Amsterdam from 1994 until 1996. From 1996 until 1997, De Jong worked as an anesthesiologist and intensivist at the Sint Lucas Andreas Ziekenhuis, from 1997 until 1999 as anesthesiologist at the Academic Medical Center. From 2000 onwards, De Jong worked as a freelance anesthesiologist in several hospitals and clinics, and as an anesthesiologist and physician at the drug rehabilitation clinic Miroya from 2002 until 2012. Since 2007 until present, De Jong is employed as an anesthesiologist in a dental surgery for children in Amsterdam.

=== Opposition to alternative medicine ===
During her study of anesthesiology, two incidents made her aware of the dangers of alternative medicine: the first case was a 48-year-old woman with breast cancer, who had put her faith in a treatment by a naturopath, but whose condition had become hopeless by the time she was hospitalised. The second case was that of a 13-year-old boy, who initially merely suffered from sinusitis, but which had grown to encephalitis, because his anthroposophical parents refused to have antibiotics administered to him. "When people cause unnecessary harm to themselves or their children because of their decisions, then it gives me a knot in my stomach. I find it incredibly hard to deal with", said De Jong, who emphasised making "wise, rational choices" regarding health. She opines that alternative therapists merely give their clients a "medically empty treatment ritual", make them dependent, waste their time and money and miss the opportunity to properly inform them.

=== Skeptical activism ===
De Jong led the Dutch homeopathic suicide stunt.

In 2004, De Jong became a member of the VtdK, and in 2009 a board member. Following the example of the Merseyside Skeptics Society in 2010 (that in turn was inspired by SKEPP's action in 2004), De Jong and Maarten Koller together with 30 members of the VtdK and Stichting Skepsis organised the Dutch version of the international 10:23 Campaign. On 5 February 2011, they staged a homeopathic overdose at Multatuli's statue in Amsterdam, to publicly demonstrate the inefficacy of homeopathic products. Health editor Gerrie Riemersma of the Leeuwarder Courant criticised the 10:23 overdose action, because "a very small amount of a functional solution will [only] work when it is repeated". In a response the article, De Jong claimed that there is no functional solution at all in those dilutions, and it would be honest consumer information if manufacturers would put content indications on all homeopathic products, in the same manner that is compulsory for actual medicines.

On 10 October 2011, she succeeded Cees Renckens as the chair of the VtdK. In that position, she spoke out against the use of alternative medicine such as acupuncture and homeopathy, because these have never been sufficiently proven to be medically efficacious; at most, there is a placebo effect. An article in NRC Handelsblad that recommended detoxification, was branded an "uncritical advertorial" by De Jong, "unworthy" of the newspaper. In a November 2011 letter, De Jong accused rector Martin Kropff of Wageningen University of 'providing a platform for pseudoscience' by approving a lecture series, which allowed several alternative therapists to speak on biophysical medicine. The Board of Directors of Wageningen University replied that attendees (students and employees) would be able to discern sense and nonsense for themselves. The Board acknowledged that biophysical medicine is a field that lies far outside of mainstream scientific views, but wanted to allow the discussion of ideas, 'idiotic' or not, that exist in society without legitimising them.

In November 2014, a naturopath who treated clients with ibogaine, which resulted in one client's death and another client's blindness, was sentenced to 141 days imprisonment. Following this case, De Jong pleaded on behalf of the VtdK and in consultation with the Trimbos-instituut and Informatie Voorziening Verslavingszorg for more rigorous oversight on private drug rehab clinics and naturopaths that treat drug addicts. While drug rehabilitation is developing into a speciality that was recognised by the Royal Dutch Medical Association (KNMG) in December 2012, De Jong warned that there is no alternative treatment that has been shown to effectively help addicts, while in some cases patients are deliberately taken advantage of.

On 24 August 2013, during the 15th European Skeptics Congress in Stockholm, De Jong lectured about pseudoscientific drug rehab treatments. She stated that it is untrue that the "medical establishment" refuses to research alternatives such as ibogaine: experiments in the 1950s and 1960s have already shown that they did not work. The next day, the Congress voted her in as a board member of the ECSO.

When in September 2014 homeopaths from Groningen recommended swallowing "granules" to victims of the Ebola virus epidemic in West Africa, and listening to music twice a day to prevent contamination, De Jong called that "criminal" and said: "Homeopaths should keep themselves and their delusions far away from these patients". On 3 October, the Meester Kackadorisprijs, the VtdK's annual ironic award, was given to chair Pauline Meurs of ZonMw for her report that recommended to conduct more research into alternative medicine, which De Jong called a waste of valuable time, money and manpower, seeing that the past 40 years of testing have never resulted in anything beyond the placebo effect.

Asked what advice she would give to people who are new to scientific skepticism, she responded that they should continue "asking questions", seek out skeptic groups and people to guide you. She states that these people will best guide them to the literature that will help them grow and learn. She added "skeptic are nice people and a lot of fun".

In October 2015, De Jong was succeeded as chair by Nico Terpstra; she stayed board member for the VtdK.

== Personal life ==
Catherine de Jong is married to industrial designer and art historian Frans Klein, and has two children.

== Publications ==
- Brewer, Colin; de Jong, Catherine; Williams, Jonathan (January 2014). "Rapid opiate detoxification and antagonist induction under general anaesthesia or intravenous sedation is humane, sometimes essential and should always be an option. Three illustrative case reports involving diabetes and epilepsy and a review of the literature". Journal of Psychopharmacology. 28 (1): 67–75. doi:10.1177/0269881113504835. PMID 24043724. S2CID 7096142.
