= Lidia van Driel-Gesztelyi =

Lidia van Driel-Gesztelyi is a Hungarian solar scientist and professor of physics at the Mullard Space Science Laboratory of University College London. She also maintains affiliations with Solar and Stellar Activity Research Team at Konkoly Observatory of the Hungarian Academy of Sciences and the Space Research Laboratory (LESIA) of Paris Observatory. She has been an Editor-in-Chief of the journal Solar Physics from 2005 to 2025 and has served in leadership roles within the International Astronomical Union.

== Background and scientific career ==
Van Driel-Gesztelyi completed a University Diploma in Astronomy and Physics at Eotvos University, Budapest, Hungary in 1974. and a PhD at Charles University, Prague, in 1990. In 2004 she was awarded a DSc from the Hungarian Academy of Sciences, Budapest.

Van Driel-Gesztelyi started her research career at Debrecen Observatory, Hungary, in 1974, where she was remained until 1992. In 1988 she was appointed a guest researcher of the Astronomical Institute, University of Utrecht and in 1992 of the ISAS & Kiso Observatory, Tokyo University. In 1994 she also began a guest appointment at the Observatoire de Paris-Meudon (which she maintains to this day), and was appointed a senior scientific fellow of Konkoly Observatory, Hungary. In 2000 she joined the Mullard Space Science Laboratory of University College London and in 2001 KU Leuven, Belgium.

She is married to Wim van Driel, a Dutch astronomer working at the Paris Observatory.

== Research interests ==
Van Driel-Gesztelyi has published around 300 articles on solar physics topics including the emergence and decay of magnetic flux on the solar surface, long-term evolution of active regions, flares, coronal mass ejections, magnetic helicity, coronal heating. In particular, she has made significant contributions to our understanding to how solar active regions form and evolve.

== Awards and honours ==
2018 Doctor Honoris Causa title from Paris Observatory

2017–2023 Annual Reviews of Astronomy and Astrophysics editorial committee member

2015 Royal Astronomical Society award for service to Geophysics

2013–2017 International Space Science Institute science committee

2012–2015 President of Division E (Sun and Heliosphere) of the International Astronomical Union

2009–2012 President of Commission 10 (Solar Activity) of the International Astronomical Union

2005–2025 Editor-in-chief of Solar Physics
