= Nanninga =

Nanninga is a surname. Notable people with the surname include:

- Annabel Nanninga (born 1977), Dutch politician and journalist
- Dick Nanninga (1949–2015), Dutch footballer
- Rob Nanninga (1955–2014), Dutch writer
