= Space Science Reviews =

- Discipline: Space Science
- Language: English
- Edited by: Olivier Witasse

Publication details
- History: 1962–present
- Publisher: Springer Nature B.V.
- Impact factor: 7.4 (2024)

Standard abbreviations
- ISO 4: Space Sci. Rev.

Indexing
- CODEN: SPSRA4
- ISSN: 0038-6308 (print); 1572-9672 (web)
- LCCN: 65069362
- OCLC no.: 41978698

Links
- Journal homepage; Online access

Space Science Reviews is a peer-reviewed, scientific journal of space science. It was established in 1962, by Kees de Jager and is published now by Springer Nature B.V. The journal is currently edited by Olivier Witasse. Its purpose is to provide a comprehensive synthesis of the various branches of space research. The emphasis is on scientific results and instruments in the fields of astrophysics, physics of planetary systems, solar physics, and physics of magnetospheres & interplanetary matter. Space Science Reviews publishes Topical Collections, Review Articles, and Special Communications.
