= Cristina Mandrini =

Argentinian solar physicist

Cristina Hemilse Mandrini is an Argentine solar physicist. She is currently a researcher at the Argentinian National Council for Scientific and Technical Research (CONICET) and a professor at the University of Buenos Aires. Between 2011 and 2014 she was the President of the Asociación Argentina de Astronomía (Argentine Astronomy Association).

== Background and scientific career ==
Mandrini completed her PhD in solar physics at the University of Buenos Aires in 1989. She took up a position as a researcher at CONICET in 1991 and was appointed Professor at the University of Buenos Aires in 2000. Mandrini is a strong advocate of Argentinian science, most notably via active involvement in the International Astronomical Union at a range of levels for more than two decades.

== Research interests ==
Mandrini's research centres on the dynamics and structure of the coronal magnetic field and its role in solar flares, coronal mass ejections and coronal heating. She has also studied wave modes in the corona as a potential fingerprint of specific coronal heating mechanisms.

== Awards and positions of note ==
2022: Elected International Astronomical Union President of Division E (Sun and Heliosphere)

2021 IAU President for National Committee for Astronomy (Argentina)

2019 Elected to World Academy of Sciences

2018 Elected International Astronomical Union Vice-president of Division E (Sun and Heliosphere)

2018 Elected fellow of the Academia Nacional de Ciencias Exactas, Fisicas y Naturales

2017 Appointed Solar Physics Editor-in-chief
