= Frank Pieter Israel =

Dutch astronomer (1946–2026)

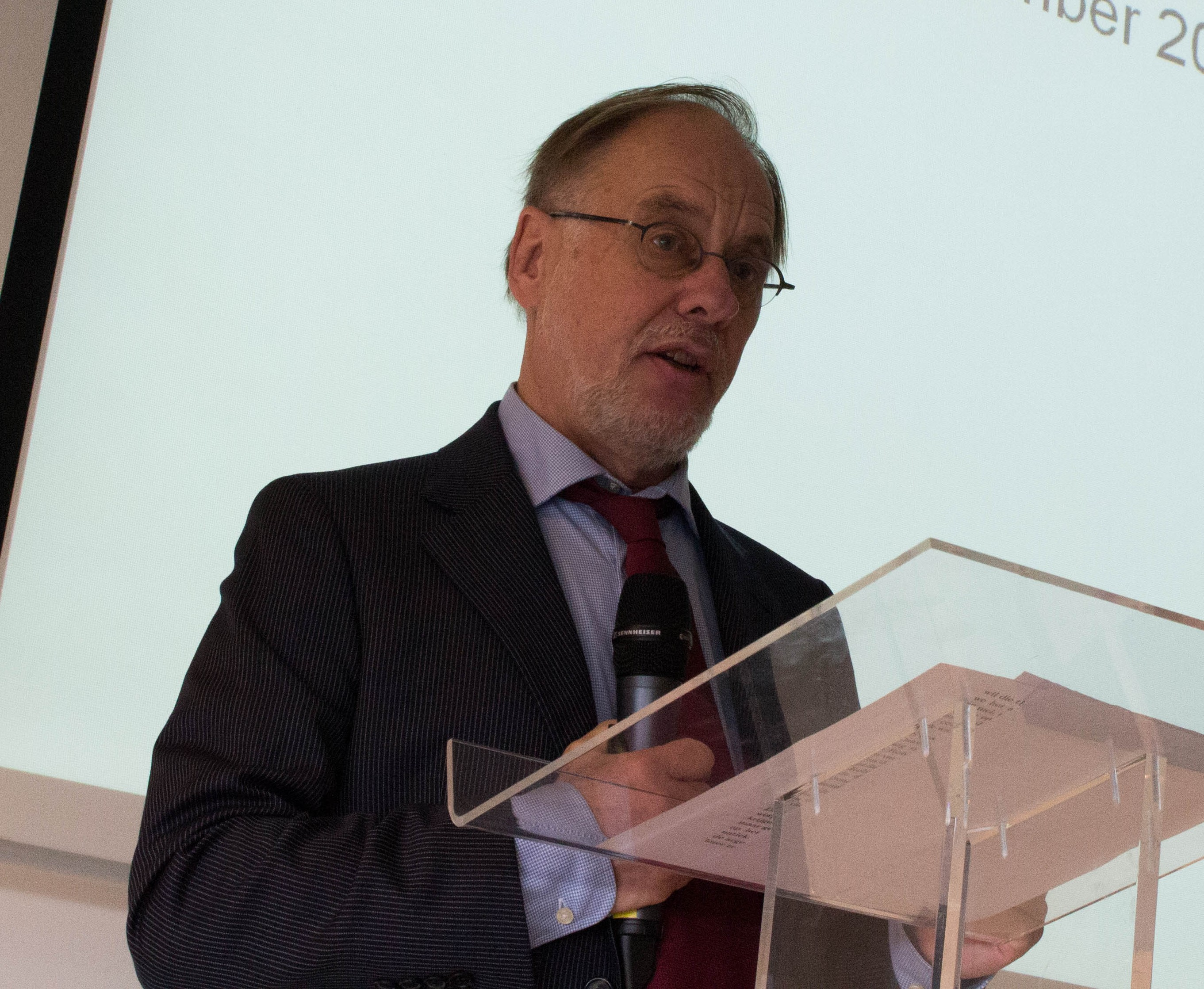
- Israel opens the Skepsis Congress 2014.
- Born: 31 December 1946; Delft, Netherlands
- Died: 18 September 2026 (aged 79); Leiden, Netherlands
- Education: Leiden Observatory
- Scientific career
- Fields: Astronomer
- Workplaces: Leiden Observatory
- Doctoral advisor: Harm Habing

Frank Pieter Israel (31 December 1946 – 18 September 2026) was a Dutch astronomer.

== Life and career ==
Israel was born in Delft, Netherlands on 31 December 1946. He received his PhD in astronomy at Leiden Observatory in 1976 on observations of H II regions with the Westerbork Synthesis Radio Telescope. He developed the blister-model of H II regions.

From 1977 to 1980 he worked at the Owens Valley Radio Observatory.

Most of his work was dedicated to the Interstellar medium of external galaxies. Since 2005 he was professor of astronomy at Leiden University, teaching the subject of nearby galaxies.

The asteroid 7507 Israel is named after him.

Israel was from 2012 to 2023 chairman of the skeptical organisation Stichting Skepsis.

Israel died in Leiden on 18 September 2026, at the age of 79.

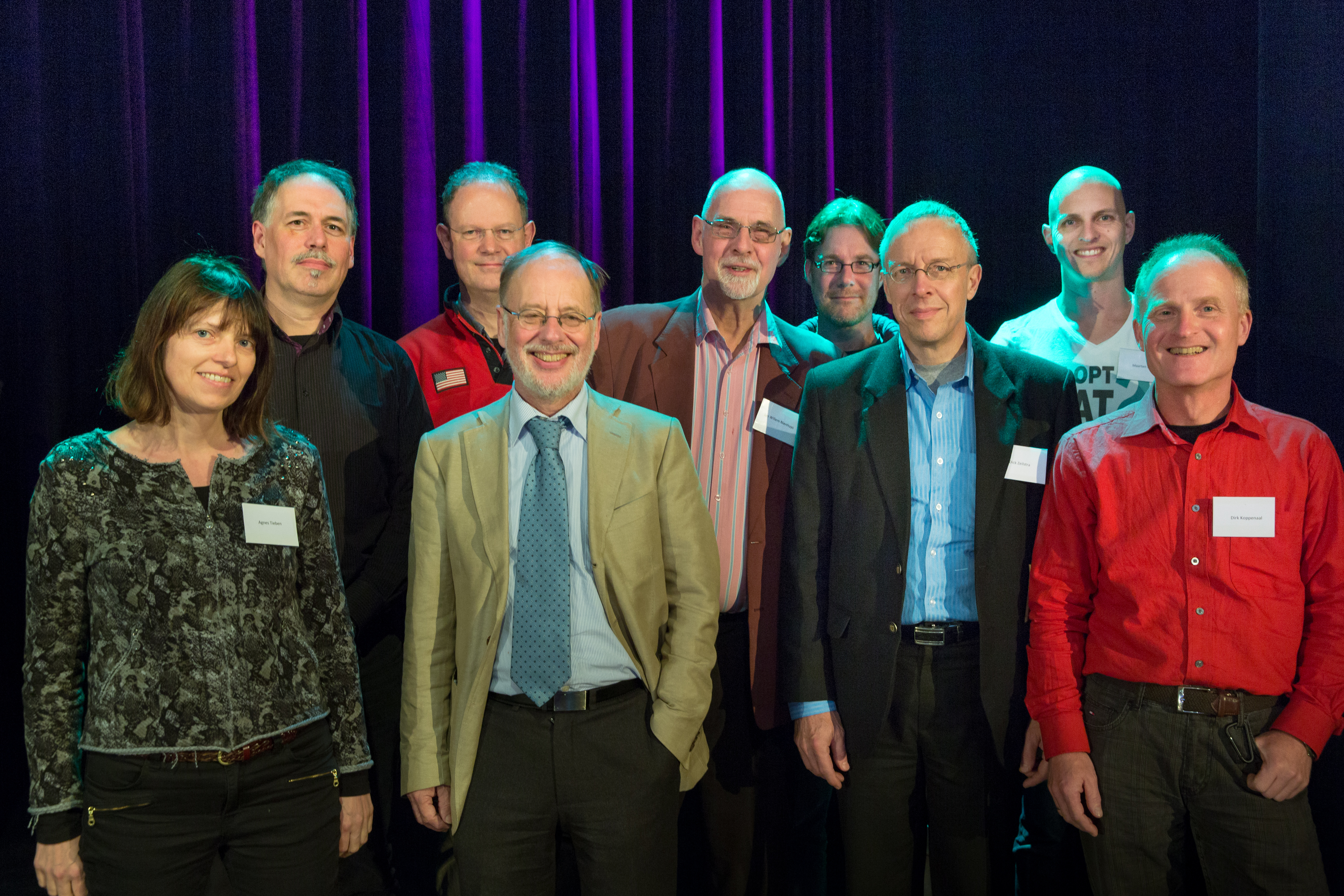
Skepsis board in 2015; Israel is the 4th person from the left

Israel closing the Skepsis Congress 2016
