= Zdeněk Švestka =

Czech astronomer (1925–2013)

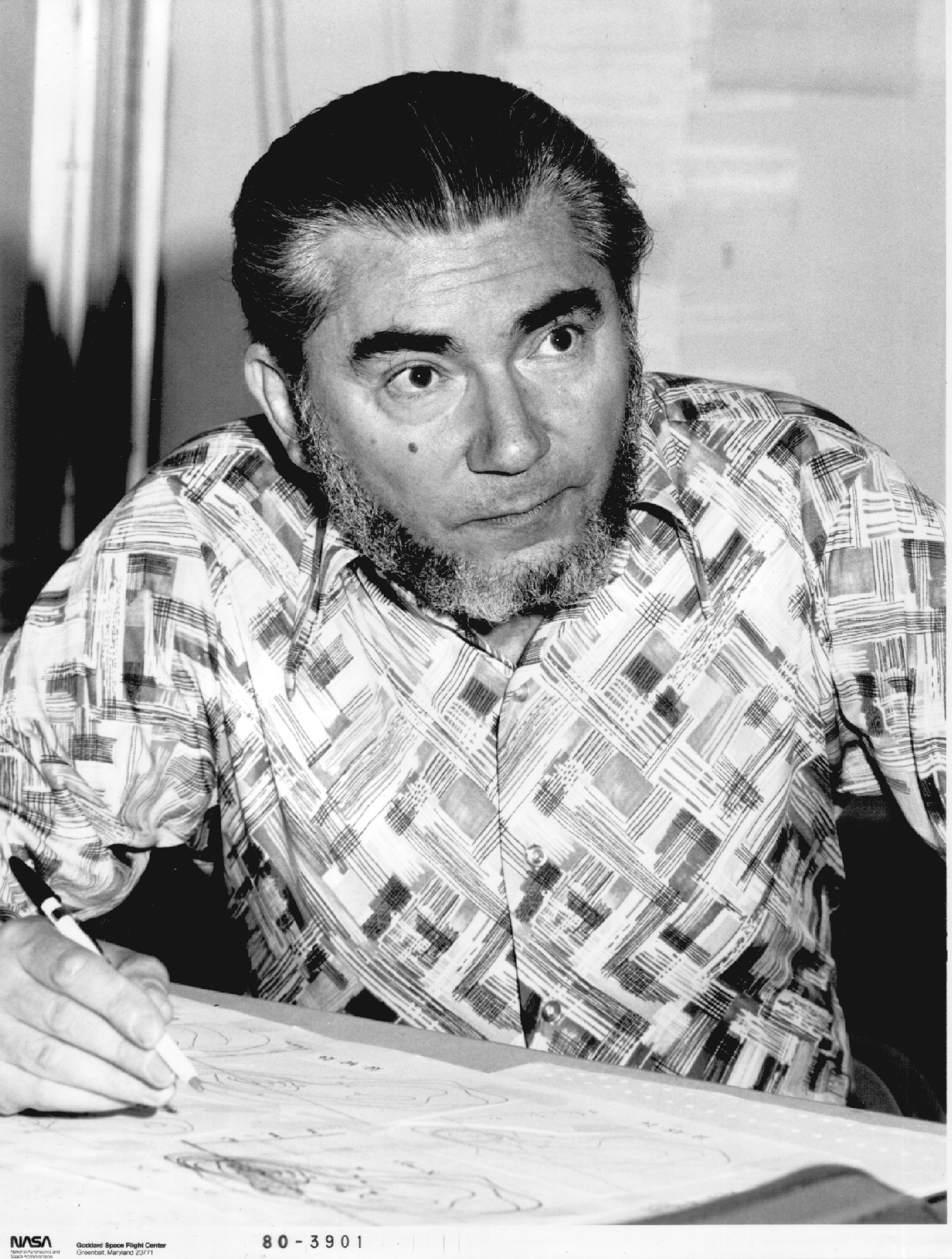
- Zdeněk Švestka in 1980, aged 54
- Born: 30 September 1925; Prague, Czechoslovakia
- Died: 2 March 2013 (aged 87); Bunschoten, Netherlands
- Education: Charles University
- Known for: Seminal contributions to solar physics
- Spouse: Lida Švestka-Fritzová
- Scientific career
- Fields: Astronomy, (solar physics)
- Workplaces: Cambridge University, Florida State University

Zdeněk Švestka (30 September 1925 – 2 March 2013) was a Czech astronomer. For several decades he was the world's leading expert on solar flares. He studied mathematics and physics at Charles University, Prague, until graduating in 1948. Together with Cornelis de Jager, he was the co-founder and editor of the journal Solar Physics. For 38 years, from the establishment of the journal in 1967 until his retirement in 2005, he handled all papers on solar flares, while De Jager took care of everything else. The minor planet 17805 Švestka was named after him.
