= Jan Willem Nienhuys =

Dutch mathematician and skeptic (b. 1942)

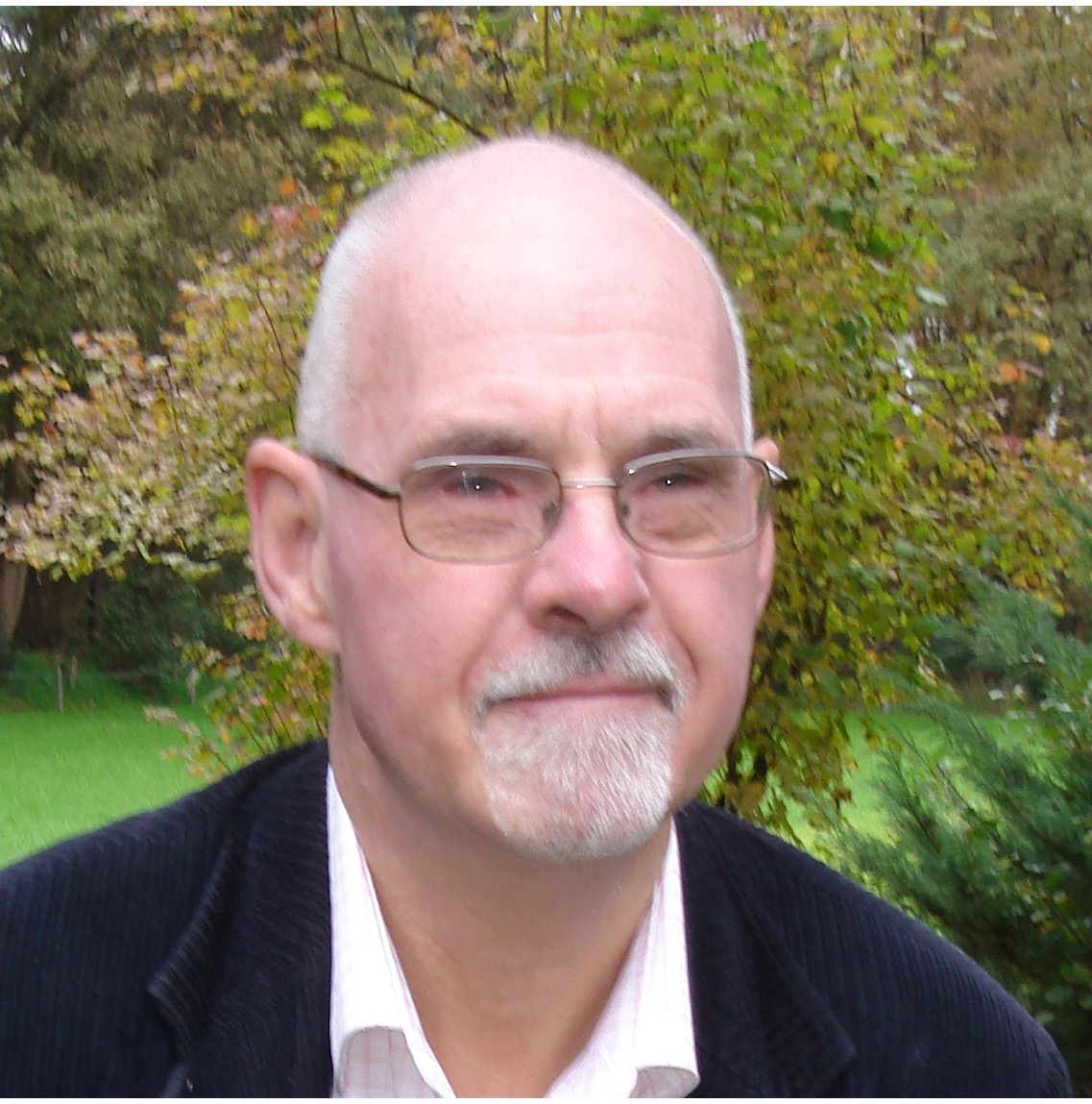
- Born: 16 April 1942 (age 84); The Hague
- Education: Utrecht University
- Scientific career
- Fields: Mathematician
- Workplaces: Eindhoven University of Technology
- Jan Willem Nienhuys' voice Recorded October 2014

Jan Willem Nienhuys (born 16 April 1942) is a Dutch mathematician, book translator and skeptic. He taught mathematics at the Eindhoven University of Technology. He is also a board member and secretary of Stichting Skepsis and an editor of its magazine Skepter.

== Biography ==
Nienhuys studied mathematics in the Netherlands, and in 1966/67 at Tulane University in New Orleans, where he met his future wife. On 14 September 1970, he earned his doctorate in mathematics at Utrecht University under guidance of his promotor Hans Freudenthal. His dissertation was published the same year in the journal Indagationes Mathematicae (Proceedings). He then taught mathematics for two years at the National Taiwan University in Taipei, Taiwan. Since 1973, Nienhuys taught mathematics at the Eindhoven University of Technology. He also assisted several writers in completing their books, and translated books to Dutch.

Nienhuys married and had two sons with Cheng Shan-Hwei. Born in Sichuan during the Second Sino-Japanese War, she was raised in Taiwan where she also studied mathematics, finishing her studies in the United States. She went on to teach informatics at the Erasmus University Rotterdam and become the director of the Chinese School Eindhoven. The couple published an article together in 1979, Onwaar versus onzinnig in the Dutch journal Euclides, and co-authored a book about China, China: Geschiedenis, Cultuur, Wetenschap, Kunst En Politiek (2007).

== Skepticism ==
Nienhuys is a prolific skeptic. Amongst other things he has written several articles on pseudoscience, mainly about quackery such as homeopathy and the anti-vaccination movement. Since the late 1980s he has served as a board member, and since 2003 secretary of, Stichting Skepsis. Nienhuys also writes articles as an editorial staff member of the magazine Skepter. From July 2008 until 6 November 2010, he was editor-in-chief of the Vereniging tegen de Kwakzalverij website.

In 1983, Nienhuys criticised the confluence model of Robert B. Zajonc and Gregory B. Markus. This mathematical model would serve as proof that a connection existed between the order of birth and intelligence to the advantage of the firstborn, as Lillian Belmont and Francis A. Marolla concluded in 1973 from a registration of the Dutch armed forces. This record consisted of the data of nearly 400,000 19-year-old men born in the period 1944–1947, originally collected to investigate the effects of the Hunger Winter (1944–1945) on mental and physical development. According to Nienhuys, Zajonc and Markus's model contained errors in the logic, calculations and methodology used.

Since 2010, Nienhuys has been a fellow of the Committee for Skeptical Inquiry. He often lectures at skeptical conferences such as Skepsis congresses and SKEPP conventions. On 4 October 2014, Nienhuys received the Gebroeders Bruinsma Erepenning, an award of the Vereniging tegen de Kwakzalverij. The society praised Nienhuys for his "enormous engagement, an amazing ability to quickly master certain issues, an enormous productivity and an unparalleled accuracy."

== Works ==
Author

- De Bruijn's combinatorics: Classroom notes (2011).

Co-author

- China: Geschiedenis, Cultuur, Wetenschap, Kunst En Politiek (2007), with Shan-Hwei Nienhuys-Cheng. ISBN 9085710219;
- Tussen Waarheid en Waanzin: een Encyclopedie der Pseudo-Wetenschappen (1997), with Marcel Hulspas. ISBN 9789044502787;
- Discrete wiskunde (1991), with Jack H. van Lint. ISBN 9062333680;
- Programmeren met Pascal (1988), with Shan-Hwei Nienhuys-Cheng. ISBN 9789062333202.

Contributions

- Leugens over Louwes: Deventer moordzaak (2011), Ton Derksen. ISBN 9789491224119;
- The Mars Effect: A French test of over 1 000 sports champions (1996), Claude Benski et al. ISBN 9780879759889.

Translations

Nienhuys has translated many popular science books to Dutch, including:

- Poincaré: wiskundige en filosoof (2013), Umberto Bottazzini. ISBN 9789085714095;
- Turing: bouwer van de eerste computers (2010), Jean Lassègue. ISBN 9789085712893;
- De Natuurwetten: van Archimedes tot Hawking (2010), Clifford A. Pickover. ISBN 9789085712947;
- Wetenschap en Islam: Verslag Van Een Vergeten Bloeiperiode (2009), Ehsan Masood. ISBN 9789085712855.

Scientific publications

- Kurtz, Paul; Nienhuys, Jan Willem; Sandhu, Ranjit (1997). "Is the "Mars Effect" Genuine?" (PDF). Journal of Scientific Exploration. 11 (1). Society for Scientific Exploration: 19–39. Archived from the original (PDF) on 24 January 2013.
- Nienhuys, Jan Willem (1982). "Differentiaalvergelijkingen". Euclides. 57 (81/82): 139–152. Archived from the original on 2014-07-14.
- Nienhuys, Jan Willem; Nienhuys-Cheng, Shan-Hwei (1979). "Onwaar versus onzinnig". Euclides. 54 (78/79): 73–80. Archived from the original on 2014-07-14.
- Nienhuys, Jan Willem (1975). "Some examples of monothetic groups". Fundamenta Mathematicae. 88 (2): 163–171. doi:10.4064/fm-88-2-163-171.
- Nienhuys, Jan Willem (1972). "Construction of group topologies on abelian groups". Fundamenta Mathematicae. 75 (2): 101–116. doi:10.4064/fm-75-2-101-116.
- Nienhuys, Jan Willem (1971). "A solenoidal and monothetic minimally almost periodic group". Fundamenta Mathematicae. 73 (2): 167–169. doi:10.4064/fm-73-2-167-169.
- Nienhuys, J.W. (1970). "Not locally compact monothetic groups. II". Indagationes Mathematicae (Proceedings). 73. Elsevier: 311–326. doi:10.1016/S1385-7258(70)80036-1.
