= Nils Liljequist =

Swedish priest and doctor (1851–1936)

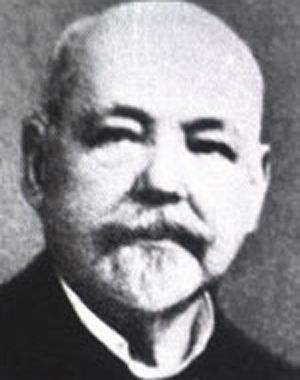

Personal details
- Born: 1851 Lund
- Died: 1936 (aged 85) Stockholm
- Resting place: Norra begravningsplatsen Kvarter 02, Gravplats 515

Nils Liljequist (1851–1936) was a Swedish priest, healer, doctor, and one of the fathers of iridology. After treatment with iodine and quinine, he noticed many differences in the color of his iris. Growing up, he studied medicine and homeopathy, which is practiced on their customers who come to him in order to remove toxins.

== Works ==
- Quinine And Iodine Change The Colour Of The Iris; I Formerly Had Blue Eyes, They Are Now A Greenish Colour With Reddish Spots – 1871.
- Ögondiagnostiken (Diagnose from eyes) – 1890 and 1893.
- The Diagnosis from the Eye: Iridology – Uniwersytet w Chicago, 1916, Wydawnictwo Iridology Publishing Company.

== See also ==
- Iridology
- Ignaz von Peczely

== Bibliography ==
- Jensen, dr Bernard; V. Bodeen, dr Donald (2011). Co Twoje oczy mówią o zdrowiu – Irydologia w praktyce. Białystok: „Studio Astropsychologii”. ISBN 978-83-7377-501-5.
- Брайен, Иннес (2013). Неразгаданные тайны таинственные исцеления. Москва: „Мир книги”. ISBN 978-5-8405-0440-6.
