= Ignaz von Peczely =

Hungarian scientist, physician, and homeopath (1826–1911)

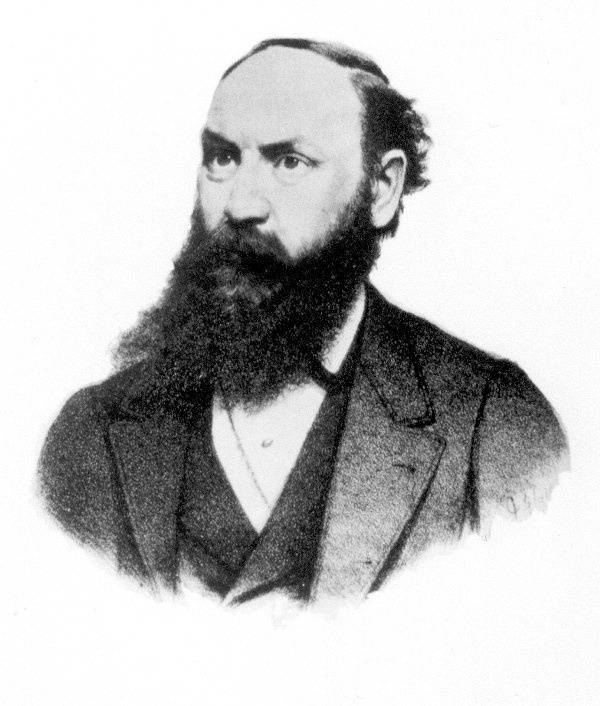

Personal details
- Born: 1826 Monyorókerék
- Died: 14 July 1911 (aged 85) Budapest
- Education: University of Vienna
- Occupation: dr. medical sciences

Ignaz von Peczely (26 January 1826 – 14 July 1911) was a Hungarian scientist, physician, and homeopath, considered the father of modern iridology. Von Peczely first thought of iridology when caring for an owl with a broken leg. After noticing a spot in the owl's eye, he hypothesized a link between the two and later tested this theory with other animals and people. While iridology has been largely dismissed as pseudoscience, Von Peczely's research led to the first known accurate drawing of an iris.

== Works ==
- A szivárványhártyáról. (Iris). Bpest, 1873. Táblarajzzal.
- Entdeckungen auf dem Gebiete der Natur- und der Heilkunde. Die chronischen Krankheiten. 1. Heft: Anleitung zum Studium der Diagnose aus den Augen. Budapest, 1880
- Utasitás a bujakór gyökeres gyógyítására és gyógyszereim mikénti használatára. U. ott, 1883.
- Die Lungenschwindsucht und behufs Bewahrung vor derselben. Instruction zur gründlichen Heilung der acuten und chronischen Lungencatarrhe. Budapest: E. Bartalits, 1884
- A fertőzés szomorú következményeinek kikerülhetése tekintetéből felvilágositás: az ivarszervek élettani állapotáról. U. ott, 1885.
- Die Augendiagnose des Dr. Ignacz von Péczely nach eigenen Beobachtungen von Emil Schlegel. Tübingen, 1887. Hat fametszettel s egy színes táblarajzzal.
- Om ögondiagnosen och en rationel sjukdomsbehandling efter Dr. Ignacz Péczely, af N. Liljequist. Stockholm, 1893.

== See also ==
- Nils Liljequist

== Bibliography ==
- Carroll, Robert P. (2003). The Skeptic's Dictionary: A Collection of Strange Beliefs, Amusing Deceptions, and Dangerous Delusions. Hoboken, NJ: Wiley. ISBN 0-471-27242-6.
- Karpov, Sergiusz; Chmielewska, Wiera (2008). Irydologia w praktyce. Gliwice: Wydawnictwo "Złote Myśli". ISBN 978-83-7582-490-2.
- Jensen, dr Bernard; V. Bodeen, dr Donald (2011). Co Twoje oczy mówią o zdrowiu – Irydologia w praktyce. Białystok. ISBN 978-83-7377-501-5.
- Abgrall, Jean-Marie (2000). Healing or Stealing? Medical Charlatans in the New Age. Algora Publishing. ISBN 1-892941-51-1.
