= Solar Physics (journal) =

- Discipline: Astrophysics
- Language: English
- Edited by: Iñigo Arregui, Anne-Marie Broomhall, Cristina H. Mandrini, Marco Velli

Publication details
- History: Since 1967
- Publisher: Springer Science+Business Media
- Frequency: Monthly
- Impact factor: 2.4 (2024)

Standard abbreviations
- ISO 4: Sol. Phys.

Indexing
- CODEN: SLPHAX
- ISSN: 0038-0938 (print); 1573-093X (web)
- LCCN: 2008233226
- OCLC no.: 37915909

Links
- Journal homepage

Solar Physics is a peer-reviewed scientific journal published monthly by Springer Nature. Current editors-in-chief are Iñigo Arregui (Instituto de Astrofísica de Canarias), Anne-Marie Broomhall (University of Warwick), Cristina Mandrini (Universidad de Buenos Aires), and Marco Velli.

== Scope and history ==
The focus of this journal is fundamental research on the Sun and it covers all aspects of solar physics. Topical coverage includes solar-terrestrial physics and stellar research if it pertains to the focus of this journal. Publishing formats include regular manuscripts, invited reviews, invited memoirs, and topical collections. Solar Physics was established in 1967 by solar physicists Cornelis de Jager and Zdeněk Švestka, and publisher D. Reidel.

== Abstracting and indexing ==
This journal is indexed by the following services:

- Science Citation Index
- Scopus
- INSPEC
- Chemical Abstracts Service
- Current Contents/Physical, Chemical & Earth Sciences
- GeoRef
- Journal Citation Reports
- SIMBAD
