= Kees de Jager =

Dutch astronomer (1921–2021)

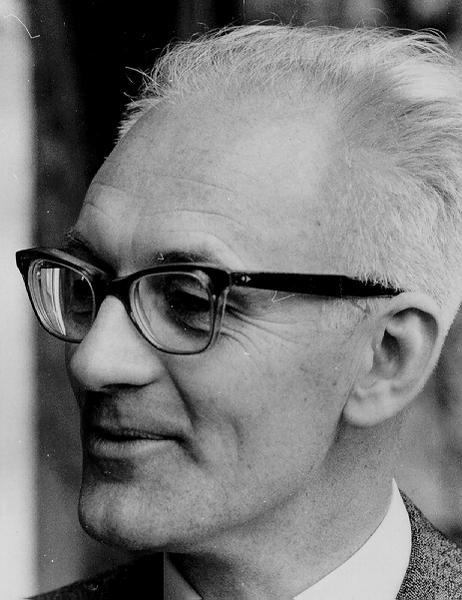
- Kees de Jager in 1967
- Born: Cornelis de Jager; 29 April 1921; Den Burg, Texel, Netherlands
- Died: 27 May 2021 (aged 100); Den Burg, Texel, Netherlands
- Education: Utrecht University
- Spouse: Doetie Rienks
- Scientific career
- Fields: Astrophysics; climate change
- Workplaces: Utrecht University
- Doctoral advisor: Marcel Minnaert

Cornelis "Kees" de Jager (pronounced [ˈkeːz də ˈjaːɣər]; 29 April 1921 – 27 May 2021) was a Dutch astronomer who specialized in predicting solar variation to assess the Sun's impact on future climate. He was the General Secretary of the IAU from 1967 to 1973 and former director of the observatory at Utrecht. He was a fellow with the Committee for Skeptical Inquiry and played an important role in the European skeptical movement as the first chairman of both Stichting Skepsis and the European Council of Skeptical Organisations.

== Personal life and education ==
Born in Den Burg on the Dutch island of Texel, de Jager spent his school years in the Dutch East Indies. In 1939, De Jager heard Professor Minnaert speak. De Jager said "I was so fascinated by what he said, that I decided right then and there to study Astronomy." From 1939 to 1945, he studied mathematics, physics and astronomy at Utrecht University. On 13 October 1952, he obtained his PhD with a thesis called "The Hydrogen Spectrum of the Sun". His supervisor was Marcel Minnaert.

De Jager died where he was born, in Den Burg (Texel), on 27 May 2021, less than a month after he became a centenarian.

== Solar and stellar research ==
De Jager did work on stars and solar physics, in relation to which he was a founding editor of the journal Solar Physics. In 1980, he was principal investigator of the Hard X-ray Imaging Spectrometer (HXIS) on board the Solar Maximum Mission satellite. His work on solar flares was often done in collaboration with Zdeněk Švestka.

From 1978 onward, de Jager did noted work on the most luminous stars, known as hypergiants. From 1960 to 1986, de Jager was a professor at Utrecht University.

== Sun–climate relations ==
De Jager's later research focused on predicting solar variation to assess the Sun's impact on future climate. Solar activity is usually defined by the Sun's toroidal magnetic field, the field component parallel to the solar equator. Sunspots are one expression of this component. De Jager introduced the poloidal field of the Sun, which connects its two poles, as a factor of possibly similar importance. He used proxies for both components and took 19-year running averages to eliminate all effects that last only one or two solar cycles. Next he plotted both components in a diagram, thus creating an experimental phase portrait. The track of the two components went from low to high activity around 1923. Around 2006 the same point has been passed in the opposite direction. Thus solar activity in the 21st century is expected to be lower than it was for most of the 20th century. A reduction in solar activity means less energy input to the Earth as part of the Earth's energy budget, partially countering climate change.

De Jager postulated that solar magnetic activity is the most significant contributor to tropospheric temperatures, with polar activity also being significant, and that with the subtraction of these factors from temperatures recorded over the preceding 400 years, peaks and dips in temperature could be observed, accounting for recent increase in global warming. Similar theories have been rejected by other climate scientists as solar activity and global temperatures have diverged since 1975, with energy output from the Sun decreasing and Earth temperatures still increasing. Additionally, warming caused exclusively by the Sun would result in an even warming throughout the atmosphere, rather than the observed cooling in the upper atmosphere and warming in the lower atmosphere associated with greenhouse gases.

== Cyclosophy ==
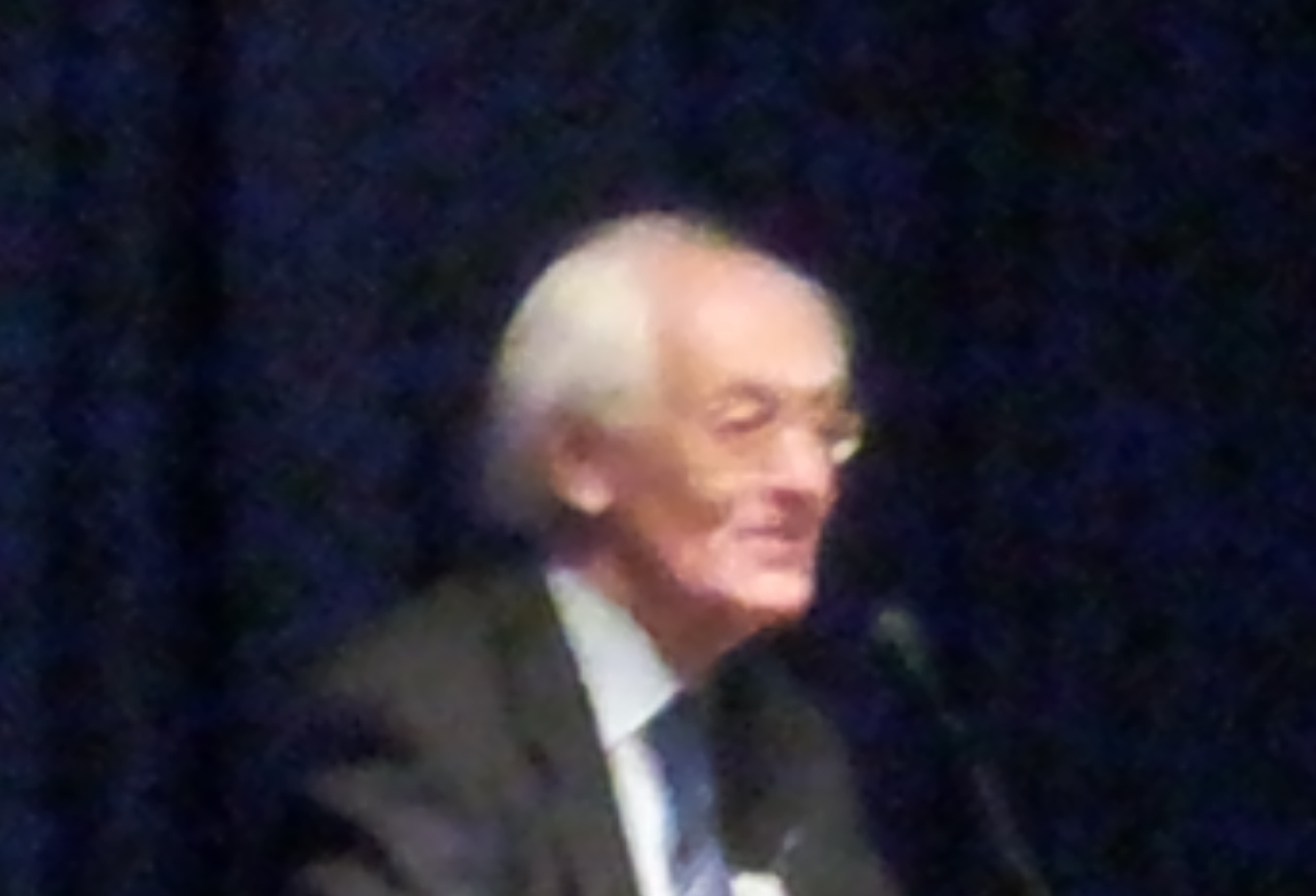
Kees de Jager in 2011

Expanding on a 1990 paper presentation at the International Skeptics Conference, de Jager published an article for Skeptical Inquirer where he parodies numerology. In Adventures in Science and Cyclosophy, de Jager claims that many times pseudoscientific reasoning ignores coincidences dealing with the relationship between objects when there are unlimited data points. He states that measurements surrounding the Great Pyramids have been used to show a relationship with astronomy. To do so, he explains, anyone can use the law of large numbers to relate to anything one would want, to try and prove there is some connection. As an illustration, he uses the example of his bicycle and the cosmos. Enthusiasts in this formula have created a website that allows visitors to submit data to replicate de Jager's experiment.

I measured the diameters of my bike's: -pedals, symbolizing the forward-going dynamics; -front wheel, which directs my ways into the unknown future; -lamp, enlightening my paths; -bell, through which I communicate with encounters. Thus I laid the building stones for a new holistic four-dimensional religion apt to the coming of the New Age of Aquarius: cyclosophy. The measurements were expressed in Holy Bike inches, being 17 mm. This is so since 1 is the first prime number and 17 the seventh, and because seven is the holy number. Calling P, W, L and B the four measured quantities, it turns out that P ^ 2 √ L x W = 1823 which is the ratio between the masses of the proton and the electron.... Coincidences occur regularly in numerical experiments, as in daily life ... are not rare ... Most people greatly underestimate the enormous amount of possible combinations between numbers. Adventures in Science and Cyclosophy

According to Kendrick Frazier, who attended the 1998 Second World Skeptics Congress in Heidelberg, Germany, de Jager's "dead-pan" description of how he took measurements throughout his house showing the "absurdities of those who attach great mystical significance to measurements of the Great Pyramid" had the audience "in stitches". Apparently "his home is in an astronomical observatory, a location, he said, 'that may be very close to the cosmos and well receptive to its incredible powers.'"

== Other activities ==
Stichting Skepsis

He was the General Secretary of the IAU from 1967 to 1973 and former director of the observatory at Utrecht. In 1981, de Jager became a founding member of the World Cultural Council. He was the first chairman of Stichting Skepsis from 1987 to 1998, the first chairman of the European Council of Skeptical Organisations from 1994 to 2001, and was also a Committee for Skeptical Inquiry fellow.

De Jager joined his CSI peers by signing the "Deniers are not Skeptics" petition that asks the media to stop referring to climate change deniers as skeptics, with the petition stating "proper skepticism promotes scientific inquiry, critical investigation, and the use of reason in examining controversial and extraordinary claims", not "rejection of ideas without objective consideration".

He spoke on astrology at the World Skeptics Congress in 1996.

== Honours and awards ==
In 1969, he became a member of the Royal Netherlands Academy of Arts and Sciences. In 1990, he was elected a member of Academia Europaea.

- 1974 Karl Schwarzschild Medal
- 1984 Prix Jules Janssen
- 1988 Gold Medal of the Royal Astronomical Society for Astronomy
- 1988 George Ellery Hale Prize by the Solar Physics Division of the American Astronomical Society
- 1990 Committee for Skeptical Inquiry In Praise of Reason Award presented to de Jager for his "notable contributions to science and his vigorous criticism of pseudoscience."

The asteroid 3798 de Jager was named for him.

In 2021, Springer Nature established the Kees de Jager Prize in honor of the founding editor of the journals Solar Physics and Space Science Reviews as well as the book series Astrophysics and Space Science Library. The prize will be awarded annually to the best article in the journal Solar Physics.
