= Iridology =

Alternative medicine technique

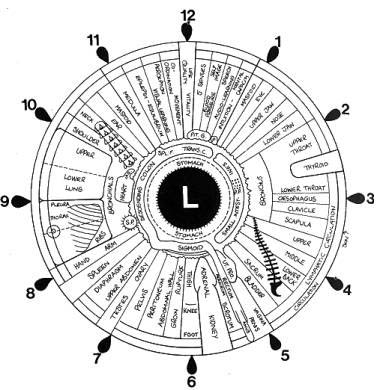
- Example iridology chart, correlating areas of the left iris, as seen in the mirror, with portions of the left hand side of the body. Changes in color or appearance of the iris are said to indicate changes in the health of the corresponding section of the body.
- Claims: Patterns, colors, and other characteristics of the iris hold information about a patient's systemic health.
- Related scientific disciplines: Medicine
- Original proponents: Philippus Meyeus

Iridology (also known as iridodiagnosis or iridiagnosis) is an alternative medicine technique whose proponents claim that patterns, colors, and other characteristics of the iris can be examined to determine information about a patient's systemic health. Practitioners match their observations to iris charts, which divide the iris into zones that correspond to specific parts of the human body. Iridologists see the eyes as "windows" into the body's state of health.

Iridologists claim they can use the charts to distinguish between healthy systems and organs in the body and those that are overactive, inflamed, or distressed. Iridologists claim this information demonstrates a patient's susceptibility towards certain illnesses, reflects past medical problems, or predicts later health problems.

As opposed to evidence-based medicine, iridology is not supported by quality research studies and is considered pseudoscience. The features of the iris are one of the most stable features on the human body throughout life. The stability of iris structures is the foundation of the biometric technology which uses iris recognition for identification purposes.

== History ==
Medical practitioners have been searching the eyes for signs of illness since at least 3,000 BCE.

The first explicit description of iridological principles, such as homolaterality (without using the word iridology) are found in Chiromatica Medica, a famous work published in 1665 and reprinted in 1670 and 1691 by Philippus Meyeus (Philip Meyen von Coburg).

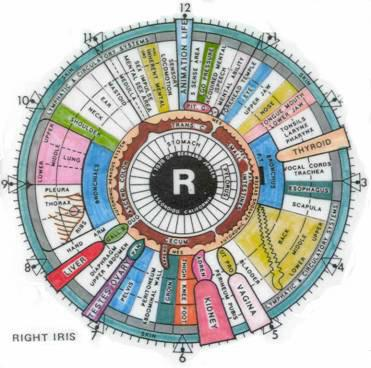
This is a chart for the right iris, which relates to the right side of the body.

The first use of the word Augendiagnostik ("eye diagnosis", loosely translated as iridology) began with Ignaz von Peczely, a 19th-century Hungarian physician who is recognised as its founding father. The most common story is that he got the idea for this diagnostic tool after seeing similar streaks in the eyes of a man he was treating for a broken leg and the eyes of an owl whose leg von Peczely had broken many years before. At the First International Iridological Congress, Ignaz von Peczely's nephew, August von Peczely, dismissed this myth as apocryphal and maintained that such claims were irreproducible.

The second 'father' to iridology is thought to be Nils Liljequist from Sweden, who greatly suffered from the outgrowth of his lymph nodes. After a round of medication made from iodine and quinine, he observed many differences in the colour of his iris. This observation inspired him to create and publish an atlas in 1893, which contained 258 black and white illustrations and 12 colour illustrations of the iris, known as the Diagnosis of the Eye.

In Germany, Pastor Emanuel Felke developed a form of homeopathy for treating specific illnesses and described new iris signs in the early 1900s. However, Felke was subject to long and bitter litigation. The Felke Institute in Gerlingen, Germany, was established as a leading center of iridological research and training.

Iridology became better known in the United States in the 1950s, when Bernard Jensen, an American chiropractor, began giving classes in his method. This is in direct relationship with P. Johannes Thiel, Eduard Lahn (who became an American under the name of Edward Lane), and J Haskell Kritzer. Jensen emphasized the importance of the body's exposure to toxins, and the use of natural foods as detoxifiers. In 1979, in collaboration with two other iridologists, Jensen failed to establish the basis of their practice when they examined photographs of the eyes of 143 patients in an attempt to determine which ones had kidney impairments. Of the patients, 48 had been diagnosed with kidney disease, and the rest had normal kidney function. Based on their analysis of the patients' irises, the three iridologists could not detect which patients had kidney disease and which did not.

== Criticism ==
Scientists dismiss iridology given that published studies have indicated a lack of success for its claims. No clinical study to date has demonstrated a correlation between illness in the body and coinciding observable changes in the iris. In controlled experiments, practitioners of iridology have performed statistically no better than chance in determining the presence of a disease or condition solely through observation of the iris.

Iridology is based on a premise that is at odds with the fact that the iris does not undergo substantial changes in an individual's life. Iris texture is a phenotypical feature that develops during gestation and remains unchanged after infancy. There is no evidence for changes in the iris pattern other than variations in pigmentation in the first years of life and variations caused by glaucoma treatment. The stability of iris structures is the foundation of the biometric technology, which uses iris recognition for identification purposes.

James Randi has argued that despite the lack of clinical efficacy, iridology remains unfalsifiable since iridologists do not provide a distinction between current physical defects and "future" defects; thus, iridiagnostic claims cannot be proven wrong.

== Scientific research into iridology ==
Well-controlled scientific evaluation of iridology has shown negative results, with all rigorous double blind trials failing to find any statistical significance to its claims.

In 2015, the Australian Government's Department of Health published the results of a review of alternative therapies that sought to determine if any were suitable for being covered by health insurance. Iridology was one of 17 therapies evaluated for which no clear evidence of effectiveness was found.

A German study from 1957, which took more than 4,000 iris photographs of more than 1,000 people, concluded that iridology was useless as a diagnostic tool.

In 1979, Bernard Jensen, a leading American iridologist, and two other iridology proponents failed to establish the basis of their practice when they examined photographs of the eyes of 143 patients in an attempt to determine which ones had kidney impairments. Of the patients, 48 had been diagnosed with kidney disease, and the rest had normal kidney function. Based on their analysis of the patients' irises, the three iridologists could not detect which patients had kidney disease and which did not. One iridologist, for example, decided that 88% of the normal patients had kidney disease, while another judged through his iris analysis that 74% of patients who needed artificial kidney treatment were normal.

Another study was published in the British Medical Journal which selected 39 patients who were due to have their gall bladder removed the following day, because of suspected gallstones. The study also selected a group of people who did not have diseased gallbladders to act as a control. A group of five iridologists examined a series of slides of both groups' irises. The iridologists could not correctly identify which patients had gallbladder problems and which had healthy gallbladders. For example, one of the iridologists diagnosed 49% of the patients with gallstones as having them and 51% as not having them. The author concluded: "this study showed that iridology is not a useful diagnostic aid."

Edzard Ernst raised the question in 2000:

Does iridology work? ... This search strategy resulted in 77 publications on the subject of iridology. ... All of the uncontrolled studies and several of the unmasked experiments suggested that iridology was a valid diagnostic tool. The discussion that follows refers to the 4 controlled, masked evaluations of the diagnostic validity of iridology. ... In conclusion, few controlled studies with masked evaluation of diagnostic validity have been published. None have found any benefit from iridology.

A 2005 study tested the usefulness of iridology in diagnosing common forms of cancer. An experienced iridology practitioner examined the eyes of 110 total subjects, of which 68 people had proven cancers of the breast, ovary, uterus, prostate, or colorectum, and 42 for whom there was no medical evidence of cancer. The practitioner, who was unaware of their gender or medical details, was asked to suggest a diagnosis for each person, and their results were then compared with each subject's known medical diagnosis. The study conclusion was that "Iridology was of no value in diagnosing the cancers investigated in this study."

== Methods ==
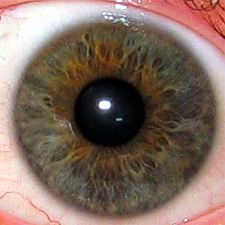
The iris is the greenish-yellow area surrounding the transparent pupil (showing as black). The white outer area is the sclera, the central transparent part of which is the cornea.

Iridologists generally use equipment such as a flashlight and magnifying glass, cameras, or slit-lamp microscopes to examine a patient's irises for tissue changes, as well as features such as specific pigment patterns and irregular stromal architecture. The markings and patterns are compared to an iris chart that correlates zones of the iris with parts of the body. Typical charts divide the iris into approximately 80–90 zones. For example, the zone corresponding to the kidney is in the lower part of the iris, just before 6 o'clock. There are minor variations between charts' associations between body parts and areas of the iris.

According to iridologists, details in the iris reflect changes in the tissues of the corresponding body organs. One prominent practitioner, Bernard Jensen, described it thus: "Nerve fibers in the iris respond to changes in body tissues by manifesting a reflex physiology that corresponds to specific tissue changes and locations." This would mean that a bodily condition translates to a noticeable change in the appearance of the iris, but this has been disproven through many studies. (See section on Scientific research.) For example, acute inflammatory, chronic inflammatory and catarrhal signs may indicate involvement, maintenance, or healing of corresponding distant tissues, respectively. Other features that iridologists look for are contraction rings and Klumpenzellen, which may indicate various other health conditions, as interpreted in context.

In Canada and the United States, iridology is not regulated or licensed by any governmental agency. Numerous organizations offer certification courses.

== Possible harms ==
Medical errors—treatment for conditions diagnosed via this method that do not exist (false positive result) or a false sense of security when a serious condition is not diagnosed by this method (false negative result)—could lead to improper or delayed treatment and even loss of life.

== See also ==
- Moleosophy
- Phrenology
- Reflexology
