= Stichting Skepsis =

Dutch skepticism organization

- Founded: 1987
- Type: Non-profit organization
- Purpose: Scientific skepticism
- Location: Utrecht, Netherlands
- Region served: Netherlands, Belgium
- Chairman: Frank Israel
- Website: http://www.skepsis.nl/ Pronunciation of 'Stichting Skepsis'

Stichting Skepsis is a Dutch organisation dedicated to the promotion and practice of scientific skepticism. It is a member of the European Council of Skeptical Organisations (ECSO).

== Activities ==
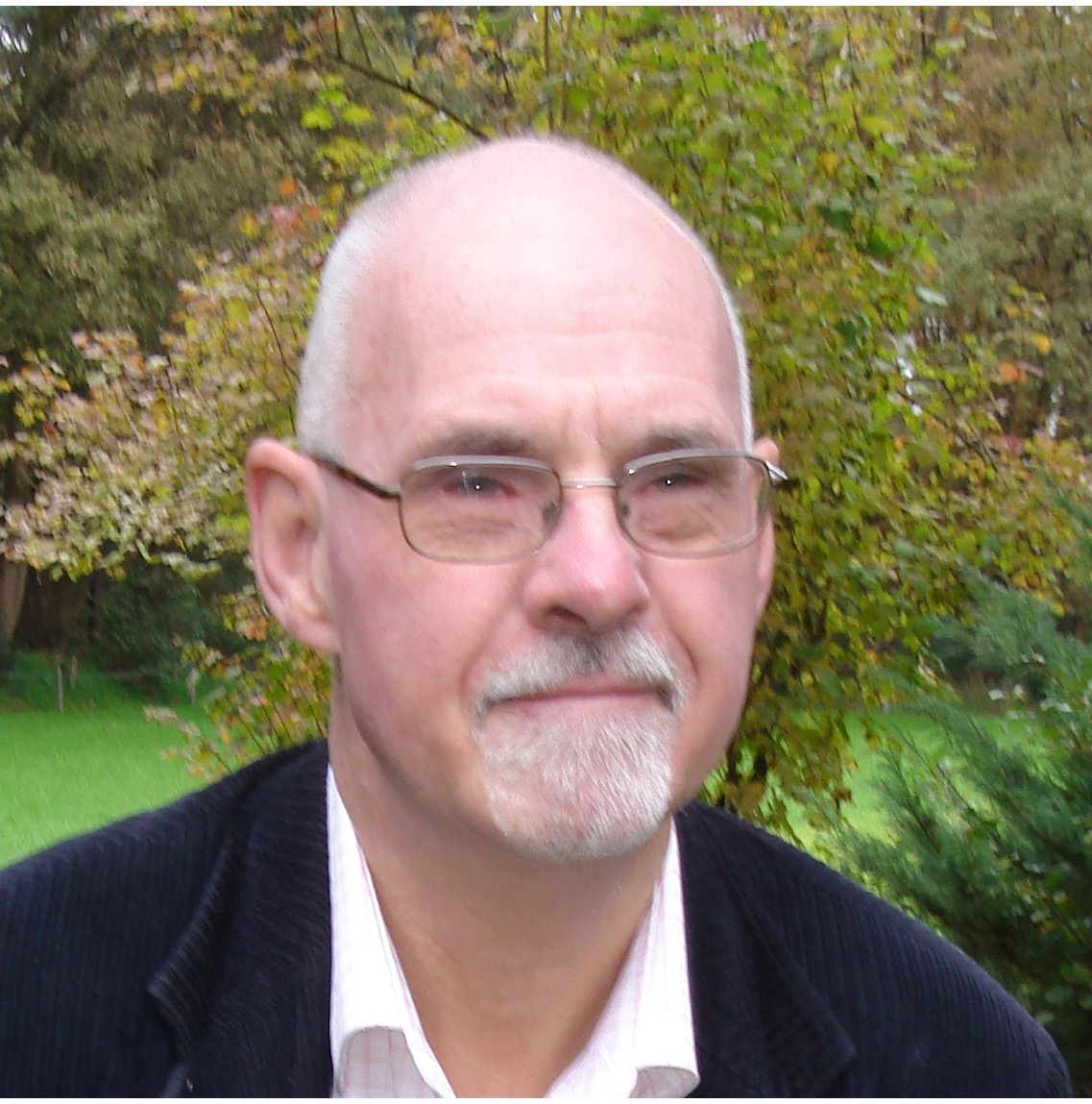
Secretary Jan Willem Nienhuys, board member since 1987

Since 1988 the organisation publishes a journal titled Skepter four times a year, currently edited by Hans van Maanen. Skepsis also maintains the Skepsis Blog that critically examines news stories and dubious practices, and hosts an annual conference. In 2011 it participated in the 10:23 Campaign with skeptics around the world. The website Klopt Dat Wel? ("Is That Right?") emerged from Stichting Skepsis, but operates formally independently from it.

=== Skepsis Congress ===
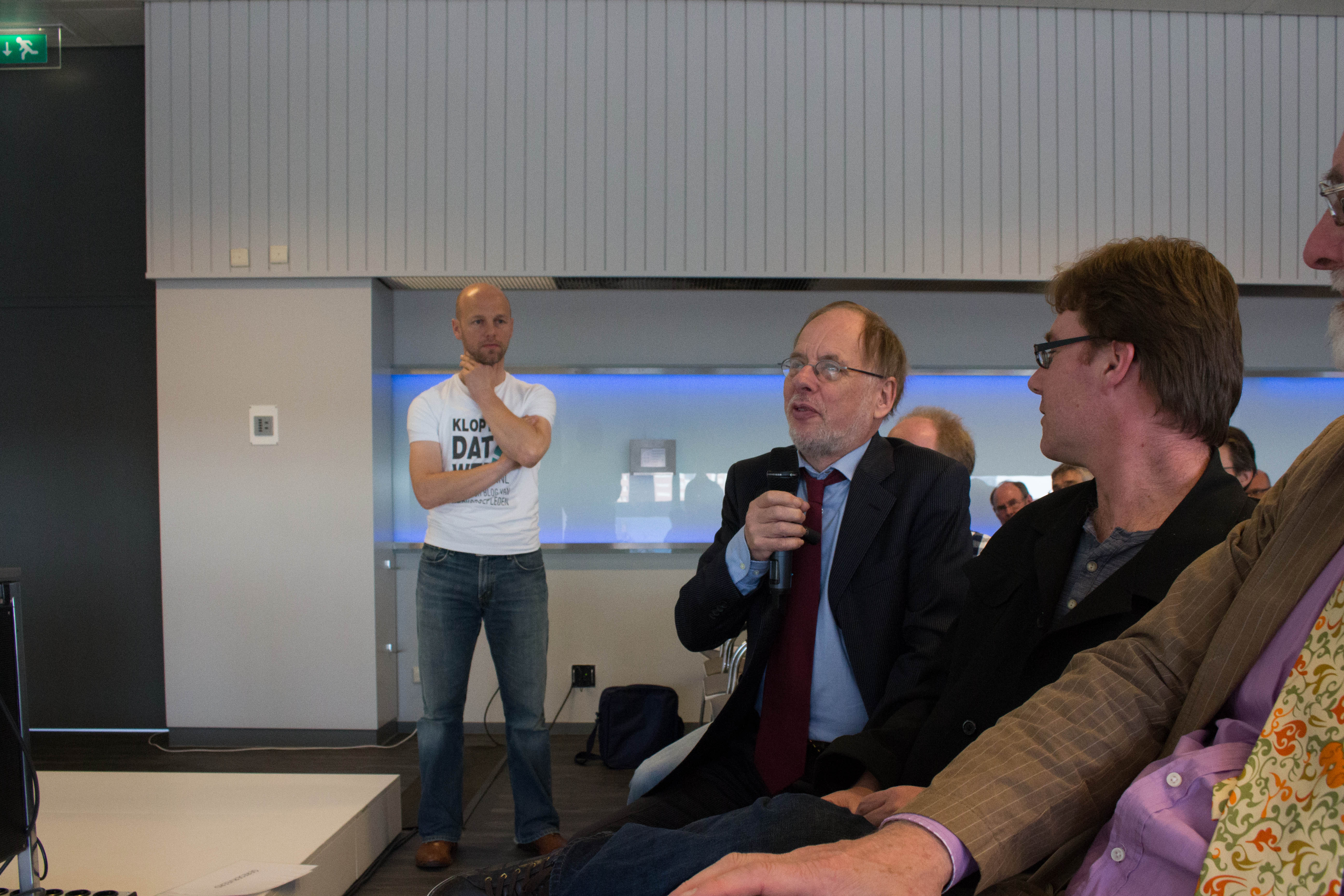
2014 Congress

The organisation's annual conference, called the Skepsis Congress, was held in Amersfoort in 1987–2001, in Amsterdam in 2002 and has been held in Utrecht ever since 2003. Each conference has a special theme that most or all lectures are about.

- 2001: "Laat je niks wijsmaken!" ("Don't be fooled!"), focused on critical thinking
- 2002: "Nuttig of nodeloos? Onderzoek naar alternatieve geneeswijzen" ("Useful or unnecessary? Research into alternative medicine"), focused on the wastefulness of researching alternative medicine
- 2003: "Waarom geloven wij?" ("Why do we believe?"), focused on the psychology of beliefs
- 2004: "Uit onderzoek blijkt..." ("Research shows..."), focused on climate change and environmentalism
- 2005: "Gaat de Verlichting uit?" ("Is the Enlightenment going out?"), focused on religion and secularisation
- 2006: "Het paranormale" ("The paranormal"), focused on paranormal claims and psychics. Lectures by Joe Nickell and Chris French
- 2007: "Ter discussie" ("In dispute"), focused on the legitimacy of fringe sciences
- 2008: "Magisch bedrijfsleven" ("Magic in business"), focused on pseudoscientific methods in human resource management
- 2009: "Kostbare onzin" ("Expensive nonsense"), focused on the cost of pseudoscience
- 2010: "Complotten: werkelijkheid en fictie" ("Conspiracies: reality and fiction"), focused on conspiracy theories
- 2011: "Brein en illusie" ("Brain and illusion"), focused on the mind–body problem, cognitive neuroscience and free will
- 2012: "Bij de les" ("Paying attention"), focused on science education
- 2013: "Wonderlijke ervaringen" ("Extraordinary experiences"), focused on psychics, religious experiences and homeopathy in Belgium
- 2014: "Crisis in de wetenschap" ("Crisis in science"), focused on derailments in the scientific process

== Organisation ==
Skepsis is an independent nonprofit organisation that consists of volunteers and expert authors, that earn a modest honorarium for writing in its semi-annual magazine Skepter. The expenses are covered by the contributions of subscribers to Skepter and of donators. Its first chairman from 1987 to 1998 was astronomer Cornelis de Jager, who was also the first chairman of the European Council of Skeptical Organisations from 1994 to 2001.

=== Board of directors ===
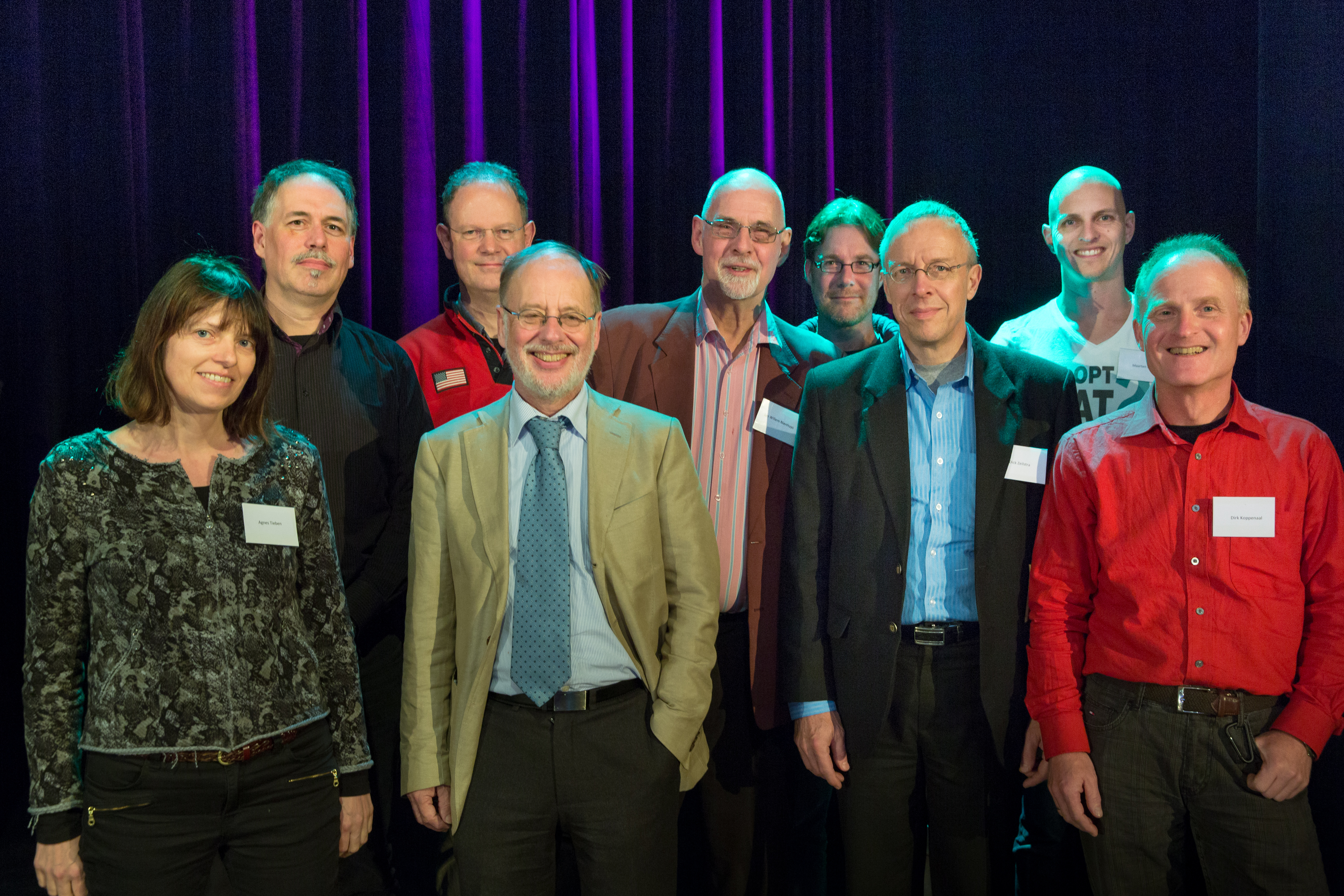
Skepsis board at the Skepsis Congress 2015. Left to right: Agnes Tieben, Mario Tamboer, Gert Jan van ’t Land, Frank Israel, Jan Willem Nienhuys, Pepijn van Erp, Dick Zeilstra, Maarten Koller and Dirk Koppenaal

Current composition:

Executive committee

- Prof. dr. F. P. Israel (chairman)
- Dr. J. W. Nienhuys (secretary)
- Drs. W.-J. van Zeist (treasurer)

General management

- Drs. P. J. van Erp (webmaster)
- Drs. M. G. A. Koller (working groups)
- Dr. D. W. Koppenaal
- Drs. G. J. van 't Land
- M. Tamboer (administration)
- A. M. Tieben
- Drs. B. O. Vos
- Dr. D. J. Zeilstra

=== Editorial staff Skepter ===
Current composition:

- Hans van Maanen (editor-in-chief)
- Dirk Koppenaal
- Jan Willem Nienhuys

== Controversies ==
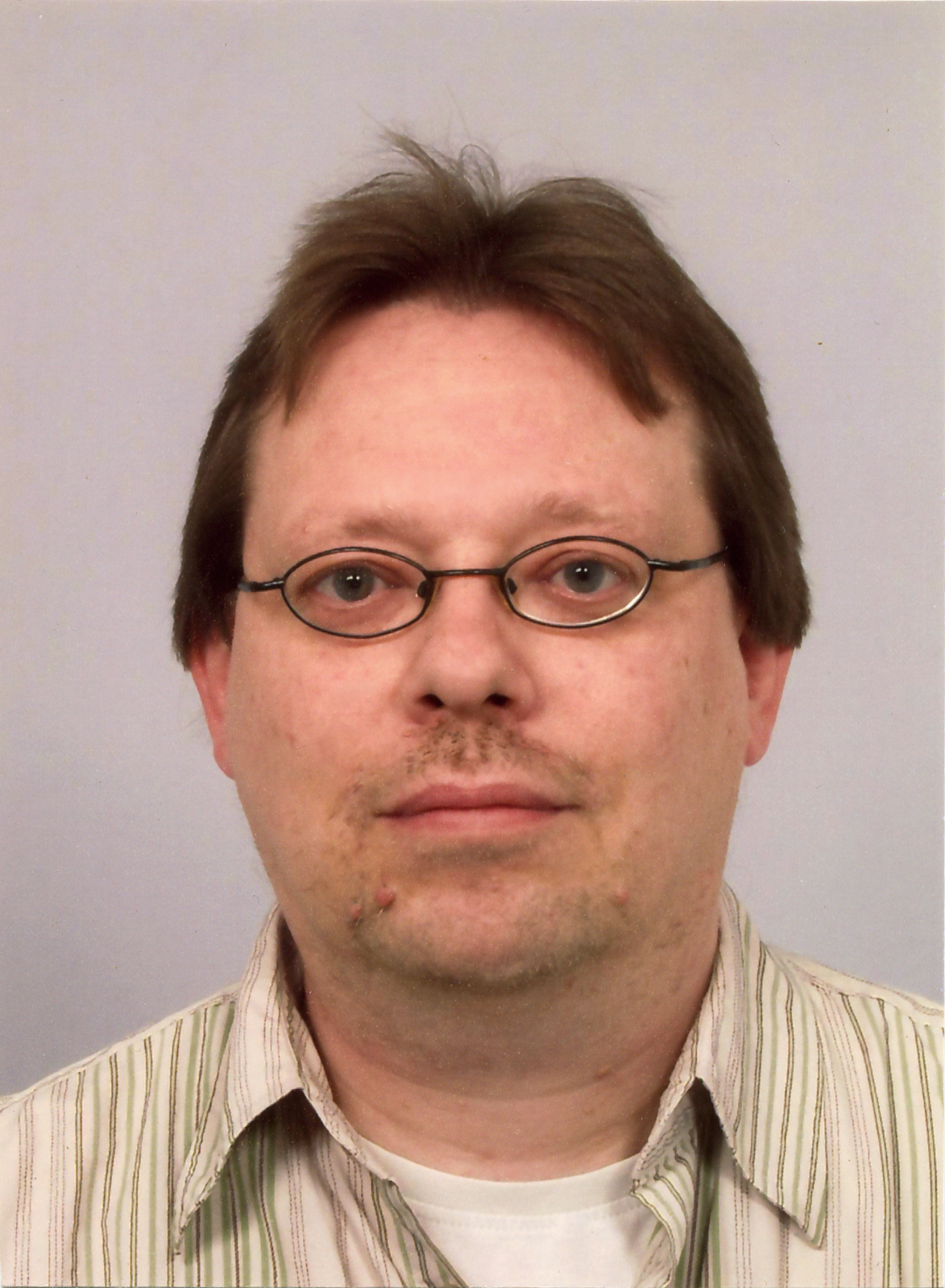
Skepter editor Rob Nanninga, 2002–2014

The foundation has played a part in several high profile controversies.

=== Robbert van den Broeke ===
Late 2005, Stichting Skepsis took on Robbert van den Broeke, a self-proclaimed psychic with numerous appearances on Dutch television. In an episode of his television show Er is zo veel meer (with Irene Moors) he did a reading for a woman. During the conversation he claimed knowledge of the woman's supposed past lives, telling her that she had been a certain "Hillegien Rozeboom" in an earlier life and that her husband was a "genverbrander".

Skepter editor Rob Nanninga looked up this information and found a genealogical website with the same information. However, the occupation "genverbrander" never existed. The word was mistyped and should have been "jeneverbrander". According to Skepsis, the fact that van den Broeke mispronounced the word exactly as it was mistyped on this website proved that he had simply looked up the information in advance. Two months later, in February 2006, it was reported that because of Stichting Skepsis' efforts no further episodes of the show would be produced and that no re-runs would be aired.

=== Jomanda and Sylvia Millecam ===
In August 2001 the Dutch television personality Sylvia Millecam died as a result of breast cancer. After being diagnosed, the actress sought second opinions and treatment from two alternative medicine providers and self-proclaimed healing medium Jomanda. These told Millecam that she did not have cancer, but suffered from a bacterial infection. Millecam's condition steadily worsened until the cancer could no longer be treated.

The Dutch public prosecutor initially pressed charges but dropped them after concluding that Millecam had made her decision independently. At this point Stichting Skepsis and the Vereniging tegen de Kwakzalverij took legal steps forcing the prosecutor to continue his case. In 2009 the case concluded with a guilty verdict against the two alternative healers, but acquittal for Jomanda.

== See also ==
- De Vrije Gedachte, Dutch sister organisation focused on atheism
- List of skeptical organizations
- SKEPP, Flemish sister organisation
- Vereniging tegen de Kwakzalverij, Dutch sister organisation focused on quackery
