= Vereniging tegen de Kwakzalverij =

Dutch organization

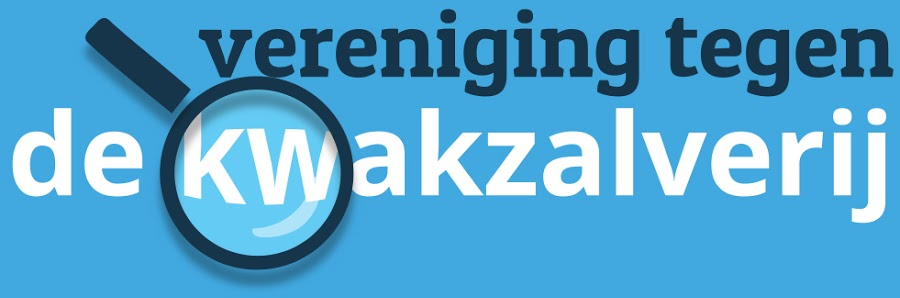
- Formation: 1881
- Founder: Bruinsma brothers
- Type: Non-profit organisation
- Purpose: Opposing quackery and promoting evidence-based medicine
- Location: Amsterdam, Netherlands
- Region served: Netherlands, Belgium
- Members: 2,000+ (2011)
- Chair: Nico Terpstra
- Affiliations: European Council of Skeptical Organisations, Stichting Skepsis, SKEPP
- Website: https://www.kwakzalverij.nl/ Pronunciation of 'Vereniging tegen de Kwakzalverij'

The Vereniging tegen de Kwakzalverij or VtdK (English: Association Against Quackery or Society Against Quackery) is a Dutch organisation that investigates the claims of alternative medicine and opposes quackery.

== Beginnings ==
The organisation was founded in 1881 and is the oldest skeptical organisation in the world. It has published its magazine Nederlands Tijdschrift tegen de Kwakzalverij (NTtdK, "Dutch Magazine against Quackery") ever since. In its early years, the Vereniging tegen de Kwakzalverij played a part in the professionalisation of medicine. Its efforts in the public debate helped to make the Netherlands one of the first countries with governmental drug regulation.

== Growth ==
Initially, quackery mainly consisted of the unauthorized practice of medicine and the peddling of "secret remedies". By the 1950s, its focus shifted to magnetizers. Since the 1980s, it has fought against so-called alternative medicine. Primary targets are Chinese acupuncture, homeopathy, manipulative therapy, anthroposophical medicine and naturopathy.

=== Recently ===
In 2000, it published a list of what it called the "greatest quacks of the 20th century". That led to legal and financial troubles. In 2003, it began to award the annual Meester Kackadorisprijs to discourage influential people from spreading quackery. The mock award frequently makes the national news.

== Goal ==
The VtdK opposes all medical and paramedical treatments that are not scientifically substantiated. It concerns those "that are not supported by testably logical or empirically viable hypotheses and theories" and/or "that are actively distributed amongst the public, while no testing on its efficaciousness and safety has taken place within the professional group". The VtdK stresses that "the term kwakzalver ("quack") or kwakzalverij ("quackery") does not necessarily constitute an accusation of bad faith or fraud."

When asked in a 2015 interview, "What are the greatest challenges the Dutch skeptics face?" Catherine de Jong responded that they are seeing alt med "creep into schoolbooks". Small newspapers and advertisers are seeing quack operators infiltrate unsuspecting news media with sciencey sounding claims. Some are advertisements for alt med doctors, other articles are "health scares" or misinformation. One example she gave was a food blogger writing that honey when baking is healthier than sugar. When VtdK made the newspaper aware of this, the newspaper apologized and pulled the article.

== Membership ==
Past chair Catherine de Jong responding to a question about the makeup of members, stated that about half are involved in the medical profession. The other half are very necessary as they provide assistance as lawyers and other help. She stated that everyone is welcome to join VtdK, "we need all kinds".

== Activities ==
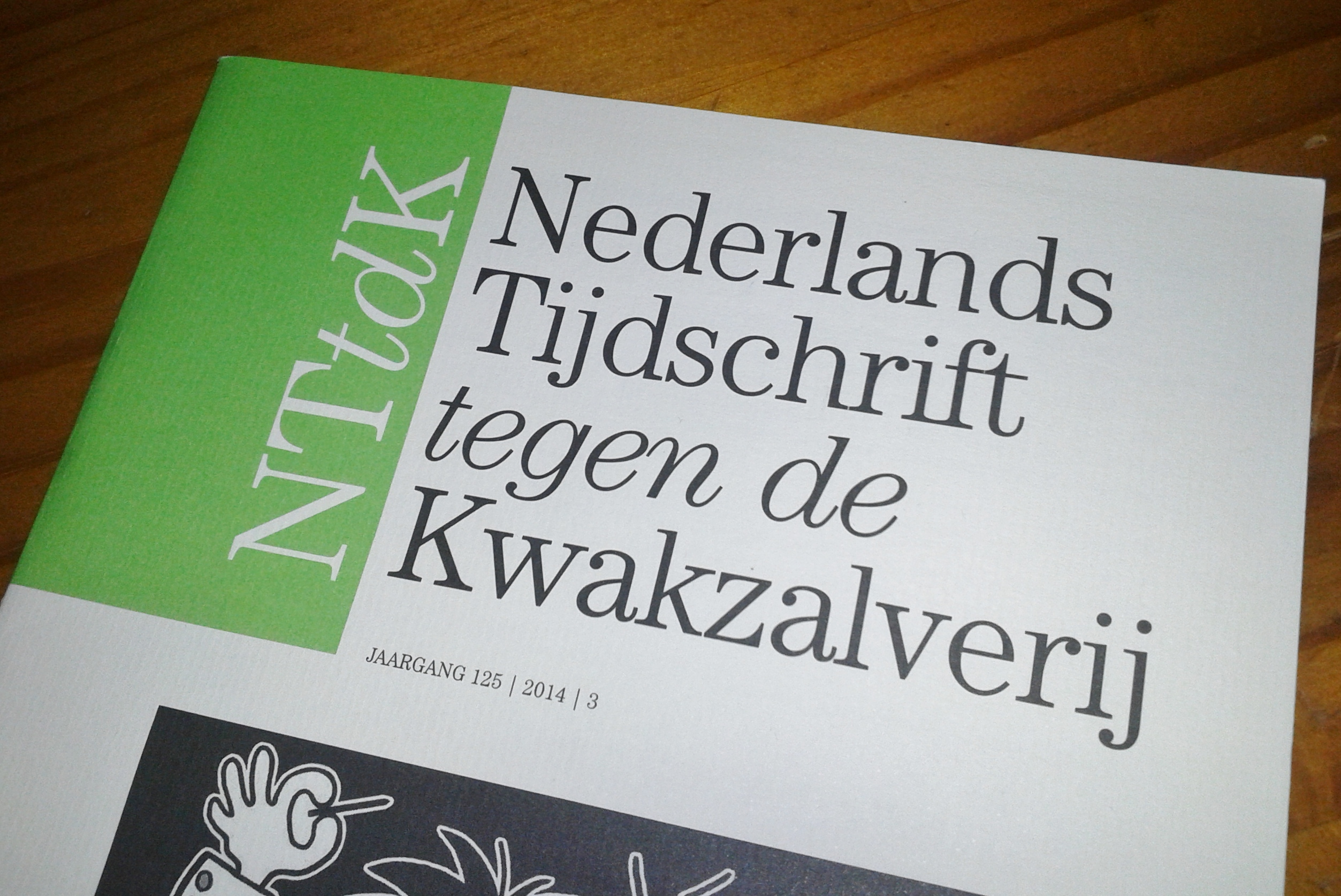
Cover Nederlands Tijdschrift tegen de Kwakzalverij 125 (3)

Ever since its foundation in 1881 the organisation has published a magazine, currently titled Nederlands Tijdschrift tegen de Kwakzalverij. Since 2003 it annually hands out the Meester Kackadorisprijs, a mock award given to the person or organisation that is deemed to have promoted quackery the most that year.

== Controversies ==
=== Mayita Sickesz ===
The aforementioned list of "greatest quacks of the 20th century" included Mayita Sickesz, a Dutch doctor who claims to be able to cure autism, depression, schizophrenia and several other diseases through an unconventional treatment similar to chiropractic health care. Sickesz pressed charges and in 2005 lost the case. In 2007, on appeal, she won. This brought the Vereniging tegen de Kwakzalverij in financial troubles. The verdict was much criticized and Netherlands national newspaper de Volkskrant listed it as number one in their top ten of legal failures that year. The verdict was overturned in May 2009, because a judge decided that using a narrow definition of the word kwakzalver ("quack") that a previous ruling was forcing the group to defend in a libel case, was incompatible with Article 10 of the European Convention on Human Rights.

=== Sylvia Millecam ===
In 2001 Dutch celebrity Sylvia Millecam died as a result of breast cancer. She decided to go to the doctor when she had chest issues. The doctor dismissed it initially and it wasn't properly diagnosed until the cancer was already in an advanced stage. At this point she required aggressive treatment. Her father had died as a result of an incorrect diagnosis. He was incorrectly told that he had cancer and died from the treatment. This trauma led Sylvia Millecam to pursue alternative treatments. However, her doctor refused to work together with some of the alternative providers that she requested to be part of her healing process, and effectively told her she would be on her own. After her death the public prosecutor pressed charges against two alternative health care providers and the self-proclaimed "healing medium" Jomanda. The prosecutor dropped these charges after concluding that Millecam had made up her own mind about her treatment. At this point the Vereniging tegen de Kwakzalverij together with Stichting Skepsis took legal steps forcing the prosecutor to continue his case. This resulted in a 2009 verdict against the two alternative health care providers, but acquittal for Jomanda. The case created a stir in Dutch media and was used as a pretense to remove a range of alternative medical procedures from health insurance coverage in The Netherlands, effectively making them too expensive for much of the public.

== Chairs ==
Chairs of the VtdK since 1881:

- 1881–1888: Gerard Bruinsma
- 1889–1897: Lambertus Zegers Veeckens
- 1898: Cornelis Guldensteeden Egeling
- 1899–1900: Alexander Carolus van Blommestein
- 1900–1902: Johannes Marinus van Elk
- 1903: Hermanus Massink
- 1904–1909, 1931–1933: Abram Lind
- 1909–1931: Pieter Willem de Koning
- 1933: Willem Pieter Roedolf Bouman (acting)
- 1934–1951: Cornelis Johannes Brenkman
- 1951–1960: Hendricus Hermanus Funke
- 1961–1978: Anton Pieter Nicolaas de Groot
- 1979–1981: Lenze Meinsma
- 1981–1983: Ben Polak (acting)
- 1983–1988: Cornelis Deurman
- 1988–2011: Cees Renckens
- 2011–2015: Catherine de Jong
- 2015–present: Nico Terpstra
