= Hall of Fame Classic =

Hall of Fame Classic may refer to:

- Hall of Fame Classic (baseball game)
- Hall of Fame Classic (basketball tournament)
- Hall of Fame Classic (college football game)
