= Abner Doubleday =

Union Army general (1819–1893)

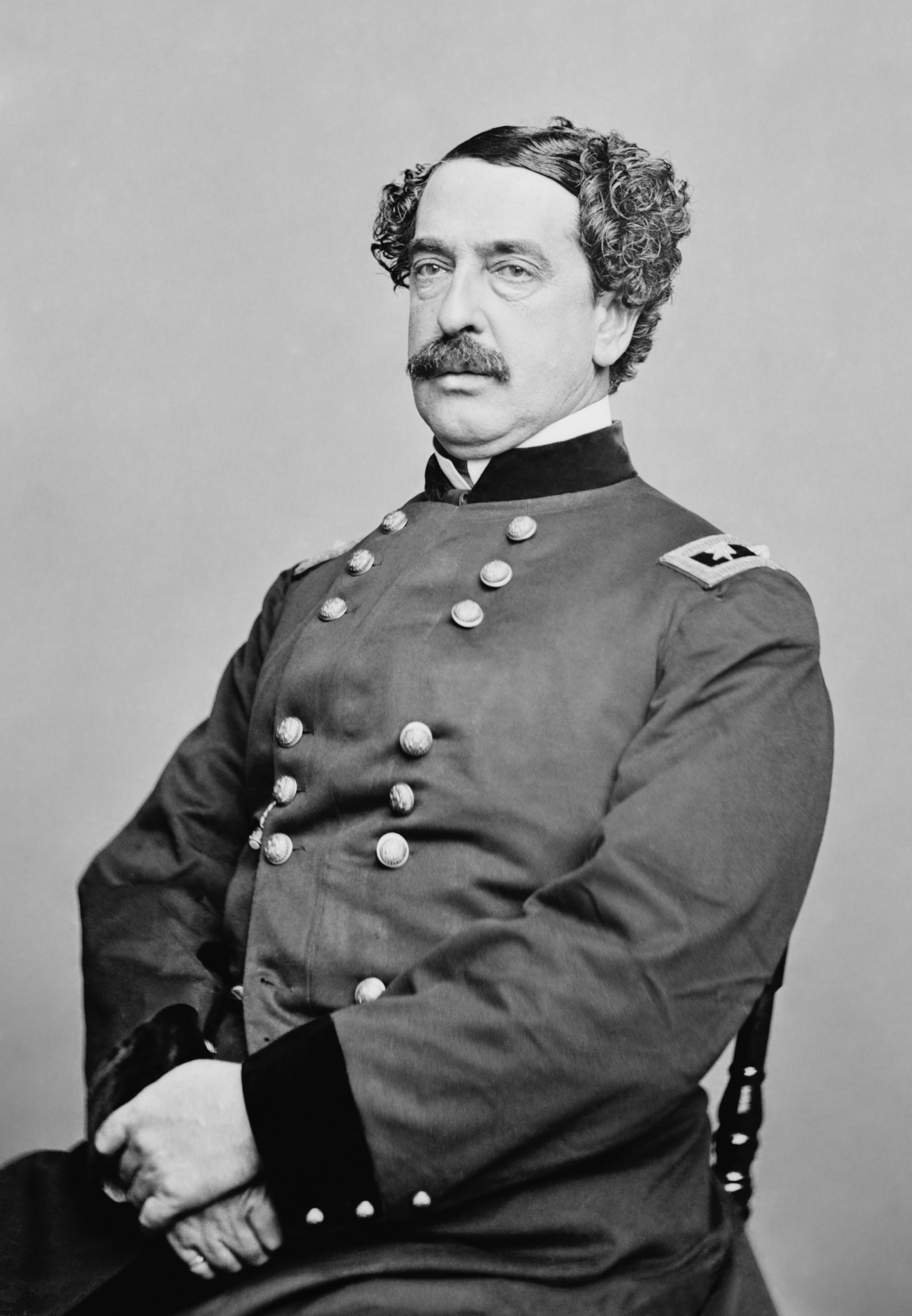
- Doubleday, c. 1855-65
- Born: June 26, 1819; Ballston Spa, New York, U.S.
- Died: January 26, 1893 (aged 73); Mendham, New Jersey, U.S.
- Burial place: Arlington National Cemetery
- Military career
- Allegiance: United States of America
- Branch: United States Army; United States Volunteers
- Service years: 1842–1873
- Rank: Colonel; Bvt. Major General; Major General (Volunteers)
- Commands: I Corps; 35th U.S. Infantry; 24th U.S. Infantry
- Conflicts: Mexican–American War; Battle of Monterrey; Battle of Buena Vista; Third Seminole War; American Civil War; Battle of Fort Sumter; Second Battle of Bull Run; Battle of South Mountain; Battle of Antietam; Battle of Fredericksburg; Battle of Chancellorsville; Battle of Gettysburg

Abner Doubleday (June 26, 1819 – January 26, 1893) was a career United States Army officer and Union major general in the American Civil War. He fired the first shot in defense of Fort Sumter, the opening battle of the war, and had a pivotal role in the early fighting at the Battle of Gettysburg. Gettysburg was his finest hour, but his relief by Maj. Gen. George Meade caused lasting enmity between the two men. In San Francisco, after the war, he obtained a patent on the cable car railway that still runs there. In his final years in New Jersey, he was a prominent member and later president of the Theosophical Society.

Although he never made such a claim, Doubleday was declared to have invented the game of baseball in 1908, fifteen years after his death, by the Mills Commission. This claim has been thoroughly debunked by baseball historians.

== Early years ==
Doubleday, the son of Ulysses F. Doubleday and Hester Donnelly, was born in Ballston Spa, New York, in a small house on the corner of Washington and Fenwick streets. As a child, Abner was very short. The family all slept in the attic loft of the one-room house. His paternal grandfather, also named Abner, had fought in the American Revolutionary War. His maternal grandfather Thomas Donnelly had joined the army at 14 and was a mounted messenger for George Washington. His great-grandfather Peter Donnelly was a Minuteman. His father, Ulysses F., fought in the War of 1812, published newspapers and books, and represented Auburn, New York, for four years in the United States Congress. Abner spent his childhood in Auburn and later was sent to Cooperstown to live with his uncle and attend a private preparatory high school. He practiced as a surveyor and civil engineer for two years before entering the United States Military Academy in 1838. He graduated in 1842, 24th in a class of 56 cadets, and was commissioned a brevet second lieutenant in the 3rd U.S. Artillery. In 1852, he married Mary Hewitt of Baltimore, the daughter of a local lawyer.

=== Early commands and Fort Sumter ===
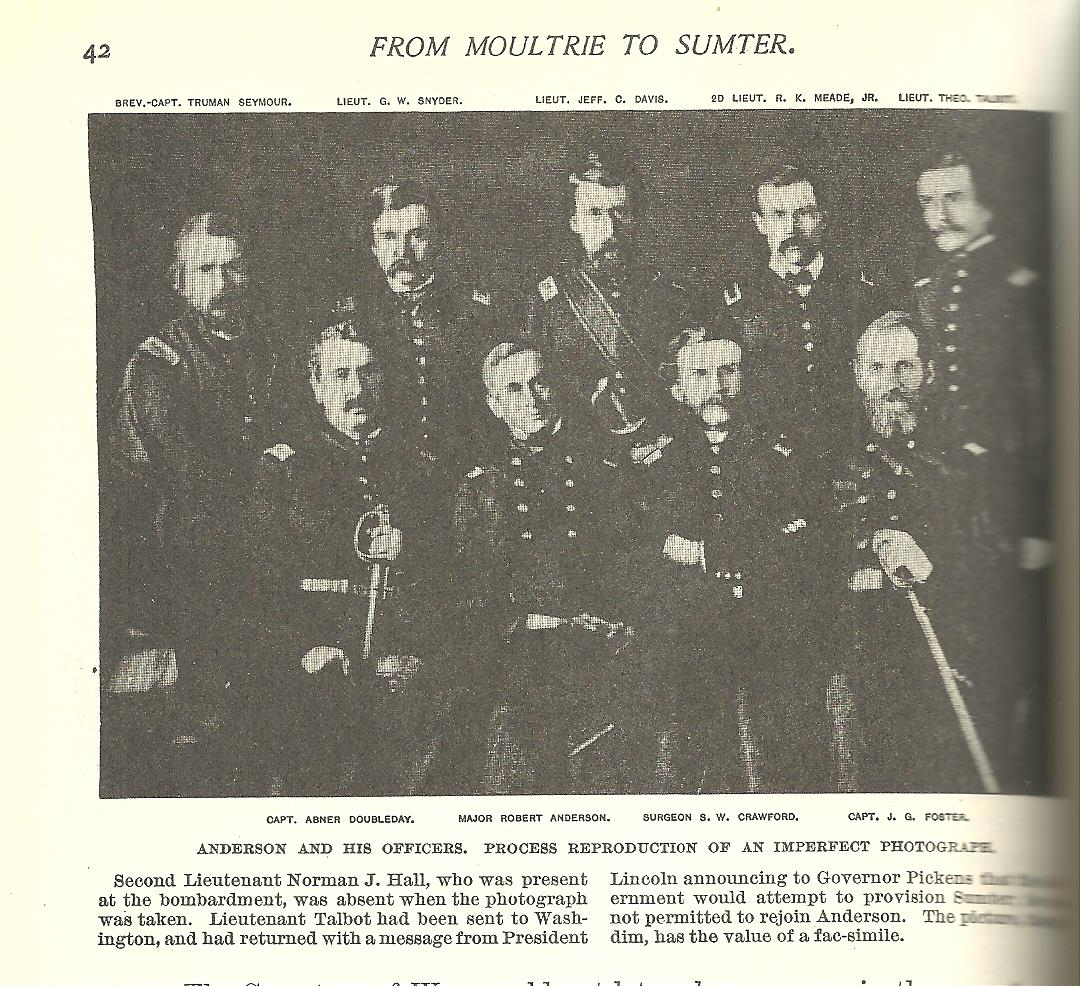
Major Robert Anderson and his officers at Fort Sumter, South Carolina

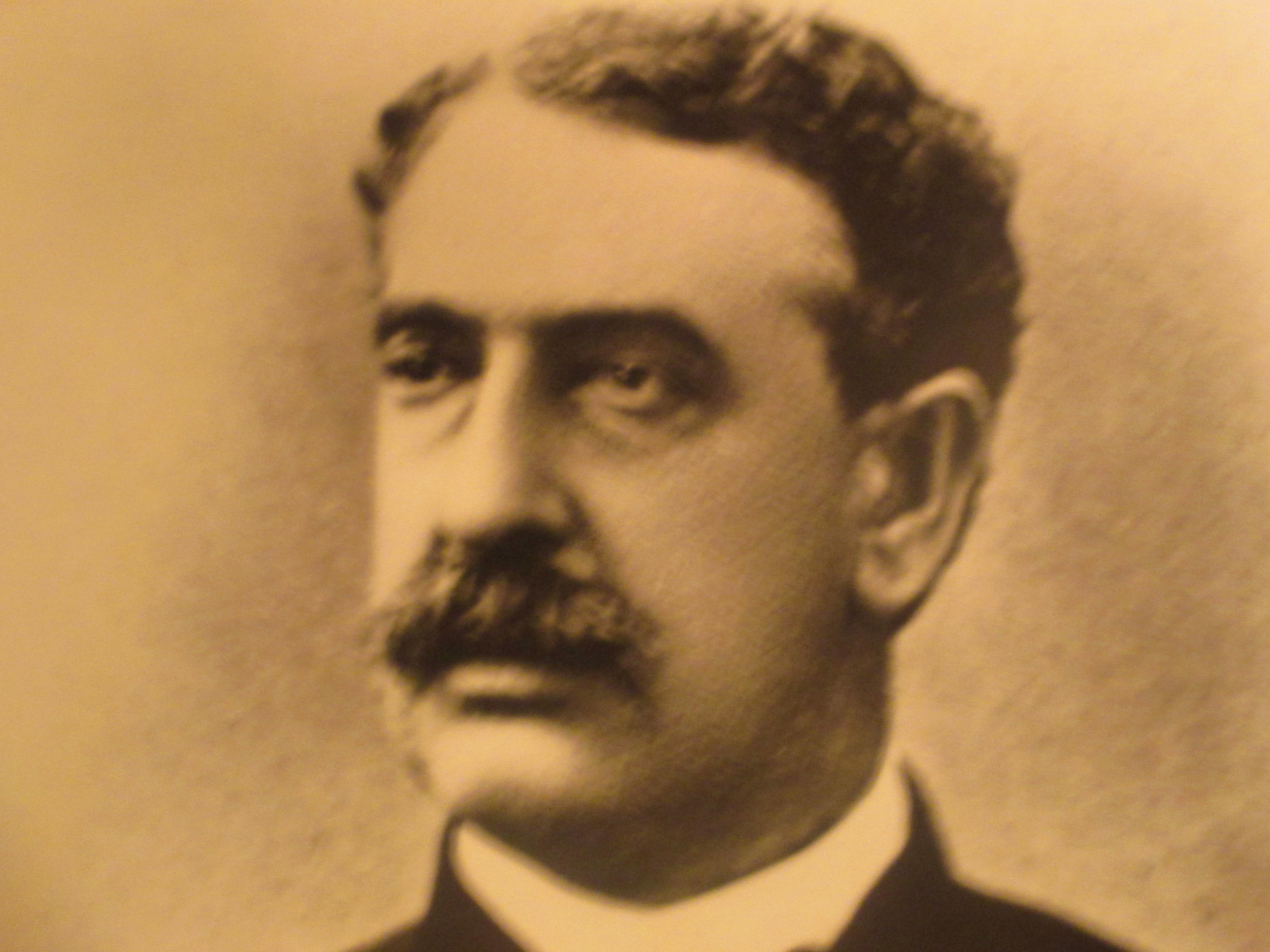
Doubleday photo displayed at Fort Sumter National Monument in Charleston harbor

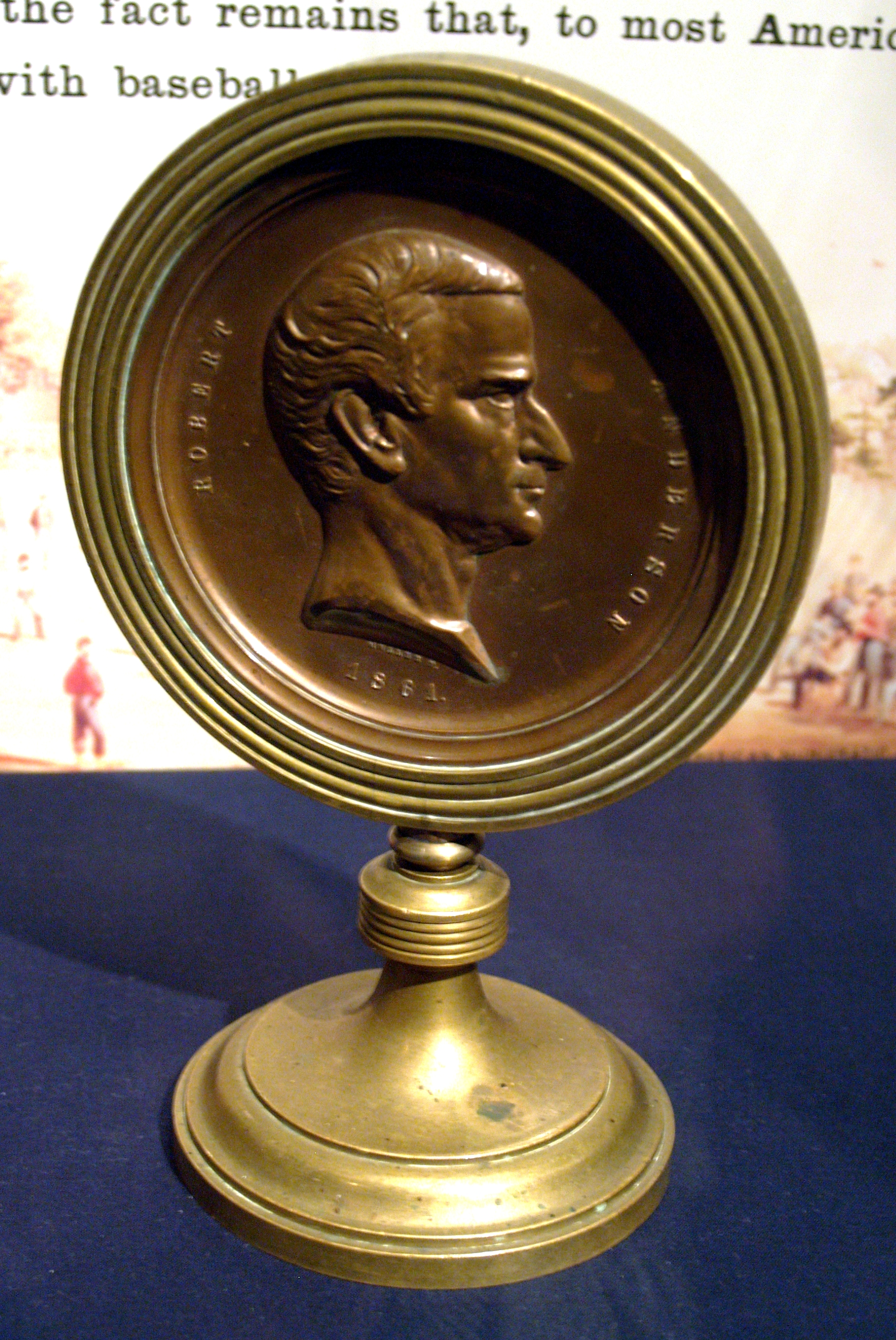
Fort Sumter Medal bearing the likeness of Major Robert Anderson which was presented to Abner Doubleday

Doubleday initially served in coastal garrisons and then in the Mexican–American War from 1846 to 1848 and the Seminole Wars from 1856 to 1858. In 1858, he was transferred to Fort Moultrie in Charleston Harbor serving under Colonel John L. Gardner. By the start of the Civil War, he was a captain and second in command in the garrison at Fort Sumter, under Major Robert Anderson. He aimed the cannon that fired the first return shot in answer to the Confederate bombardment on April 12, 1861. He subsequently referred to himself as the "hero of Sumter" for this role. Of note, although Doubleday did not invent baseball, by sheer coincidence the Fort Sumter Garrison Flag (or Storm Flag) has the star pattern arranged in a diamond shape, which by that time in history, was the shape of the baseball infield.

=== Brigade and division command in Virginia ===
Doubleday was promoted to major on May 14, 1861, and commanded the Artillery Department in the Shenandoah Valley from June to August, and then the artillery for Major General Nathaniel Banks's division of the Army of the Potomac. He was appointed brigadier general of volunteers on February 3, 1862, and was assigned to duty in northern Virginia while the Army of the Potomac conducted the Peninsula Campaign. His first combat assignment was to lead the 2nd Brigade, 1st Division, III Corps of the Army of Virginia during the Northern Virginia Campaign. In the actions at Brawner's farm, just before the Second Battle of Bull Run, he took the initiative to send two of his regiments to reinforce Brigadier General John Gibbon's brigade against a larger Confederate force, fighting it to a standstill. Personal initiative was required since his division commander, Brig. Gen. Rufus King, was incapacitated by an epileptic seizure at the time. He was replaced by Brigadier General John P. Hatch. His men were routed when they encountered Major General James Longstreet's corps, but by the following day, August 30, he took command of the division when Hatch was wounded, and he led his men to cover the retreat of the Union Army.

Doubleday again led the division, now assigned to the I Corps of the Army of the Potomac, after South Mountain, where Hatch was wounded again. At Antietam, he led his men into the deadly fighting in the Cornfield and the West Woods, and one colonel described him as a "gallant officer ... remarkably cool and at the very front of battle." He was wounded when an artillery shell exploded near his horse, throwing him to the ground in a violent fall. He received a brevet promotion to lieutenant colonel in the regular army for his actions at Antietam and was promoted in March 1863 to major general of volunteers, to rank from November 29, 1862. At Fredericksburg in December 1862, his division mostly sat idle. During the winter, the I Corps was reorganized and Doubleday assumed command of the 3rd Division. At Chancellorsville in May 1863, the division was kept in reserve.

=== Gettysburg ===
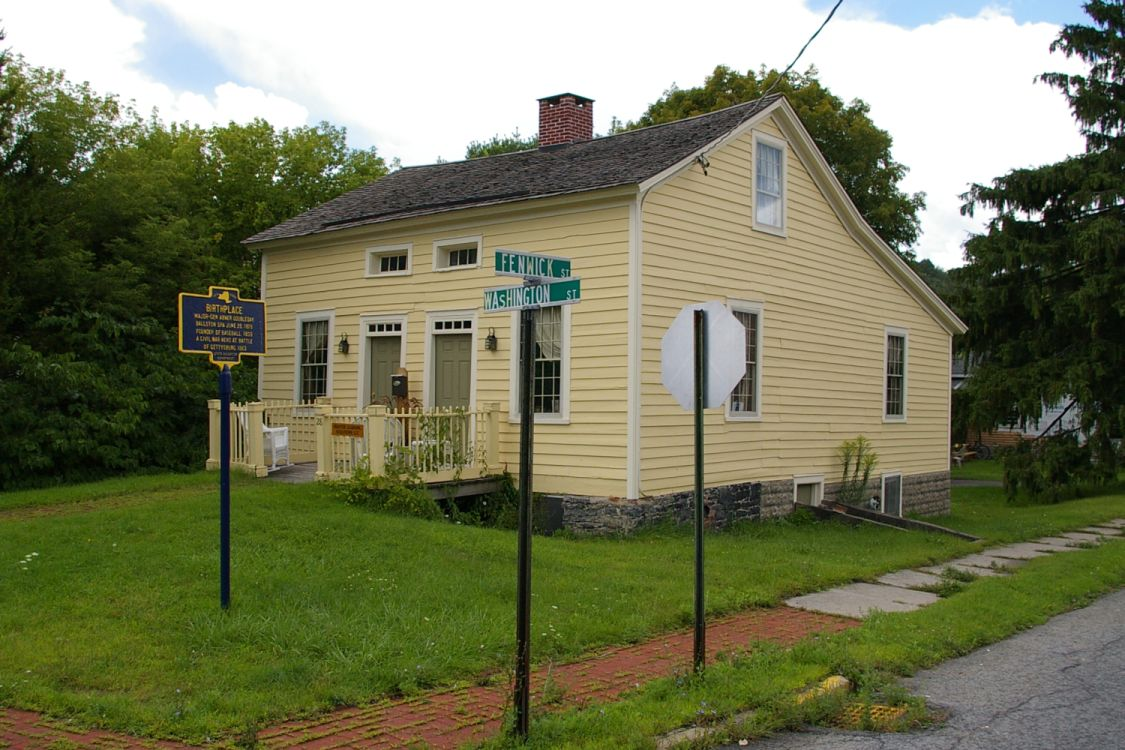
Birthplace in Ballston Spa

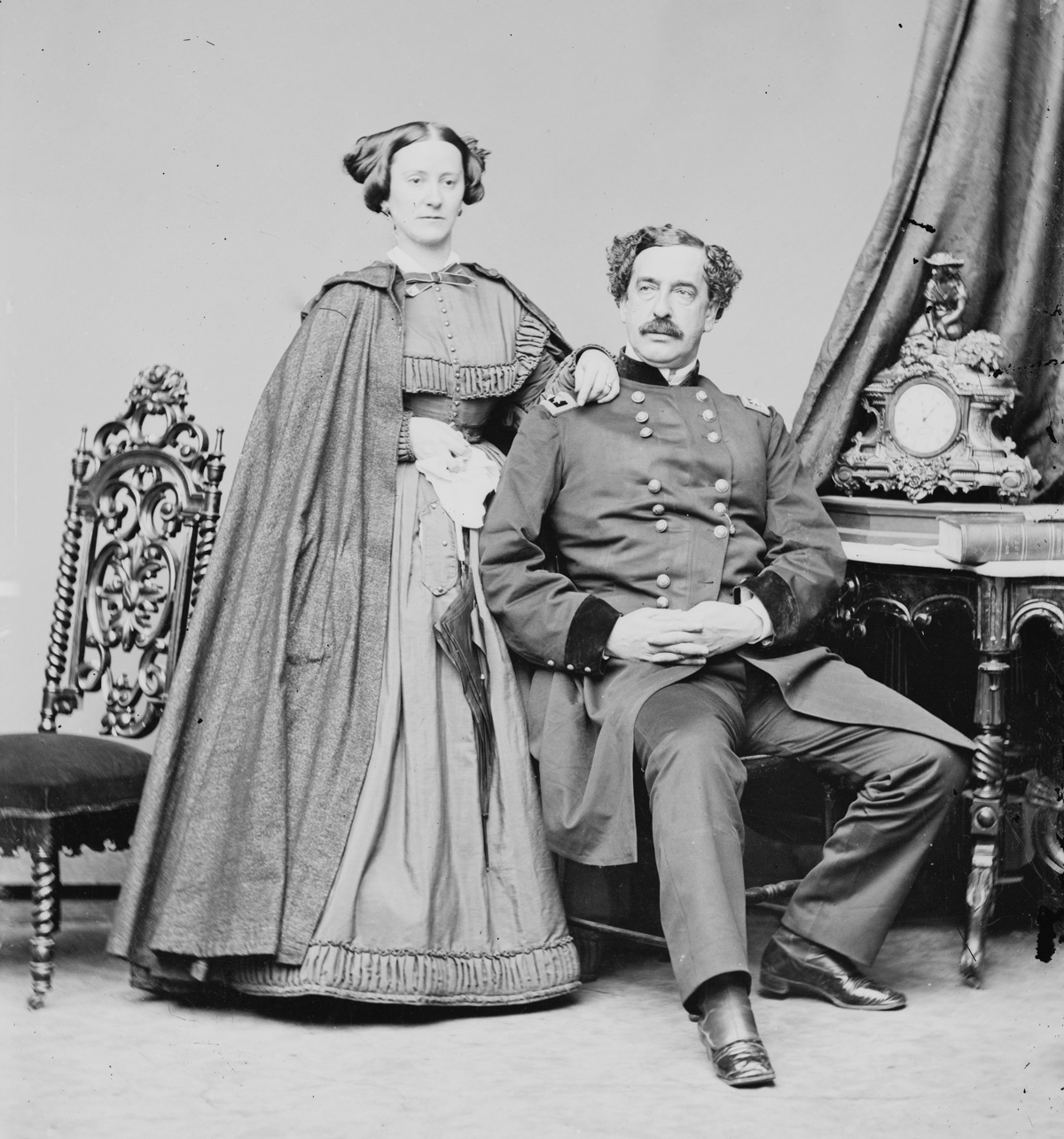
Doubleday and his wife, Mary

At the start of the Battle of Gettysburg, July 1, 1863, Doubleday's division was the second infantry division on the field to reinforce the cavalry division of Brigadier General John Buford. When his corps commander, Major General John F. Reynolds, was killed very early in the fighting, Doubleday found himself in command of the corps at 10:50 am. His men fought well in the morning, putting up a stout resistance, but as overwhelming Confederate forces massed against them, their line eventually broke and they retreated back through the town of Gettysburg to the relative safety of Cemetery Hill south of town. It was Doubleday's finest performance during the war, five hours leading 9,500 men against ten Confederate brigades that numbered more than 16,000. Seven of those brigades sustained casualties that ranged from 35 to 50 percent, indicating the ferocity of the Union defense. On Cemetery Hill, however, the I Corps could muster only a third of its men as effective for duty, and the corps was essentially destroyed as a combat force for the rest of the battle; it would be decommissioned in March 1864, its surviving units consolidated into other corps.

On July 2, 1863, Army of the Potomac commander Maj. Gen. George Meade replaced Doubleday with Major General John Newton, a more junior officer from another corps. The ostensible reason was a false report by XI Corps commander Major General Oliver Otis Howard that Doubleday's corps broke first, causing the entire Union line to collapse, but Meade also had a long history of disdain for Doubleday's combat effectiveness, dating back to South Mountain. Doubleday was humiliated by this snub and held a lasting grudge against Meade, but he returned to division command and fought well for the remainder of the battle. He was wounded in the neck on the second day of Gettysburg and received a brevet promotion to colonel in the regular army for his service. He formally requested reinstatement as I Corps commander, but Meade refused, and Doubleday left Gettysburg on July 7 for Washington.

Doubleday's staff nicknamed him "Forty-Eight Hours" as a compliment to recognize his tendency to avoid reckless or impulsive actions and his thoughtfulness and deliberateness in considering circumstances and possible responses. In recent years, biographers have turned the nickname into an insult, incorrectly claiming "Forty-Eight Hours" was coined to highlight Doubleday's supposed incompetence and slowness to act.

=== Washington ===
Doubleday assumed administrative duties in the defenses of Washington, D.C., where he was in charge of courts martial, which gave him legal experience that he used after the war. His only return to combat was directing a portion of the defenses against the attack by Confederate Lieutenant General Jubal Early in the Valley Campaigns of 1864. Also while in Washington, Doubleday testified against George Meade at the United States Congress Joint Committee on the Conduct of the War, criticizing him harshly over his conduct of the Battle of Gettysburg. While in Washington, Doubleday remained a loyal Republican and staunch supporter of President Abraham Lincoln. Doubleday rode with Lincoln on the train to Gettysburg for the Gettysburg Address and Col. and Mrs. Doubleday attended events with Mr. and Mrs. Lincoln in Washington.

== Postbellum career ==
Doubleday mustered out of the volunteer service after the Civil War on August 24, 1865, reverted to the rank of lieutenant colonel, and in September 1867 became the colonel of the 35th U.S. Infantry. He was stationed in San Francisco from 1869 through 1871 and he took out a patent for the cable car railway that still runs there and received a charter for its operation, but signed away his rights when he was reassigned. In 1871, he commanded the 24th U.S. Infantry, an all African-American regiment with headquarters at Fort McKavett, Texas. He retired in 1873.

He was listed in the New York business directory as a lawyer in the 1870s.

Doubleday spent much of his time writing. He published two important works on the Civil War: Reminiscences of Forts Sumter and Moultrie (1876), and Chancellorsville and Gettysburg (1882), the latter being a volume of the series Campaigns of the Civil War.

== Theosophy ==
In the summer of 1878, Doubleday lived in Mendham Township, New Jersey, and became a prominent member of the Theosophical Society. When Helena Blavatsky and Henry Steel Olcott, two of the founders of that society, moved to India at the end of that year, he was constituted as the president of the American body.

== Death ==
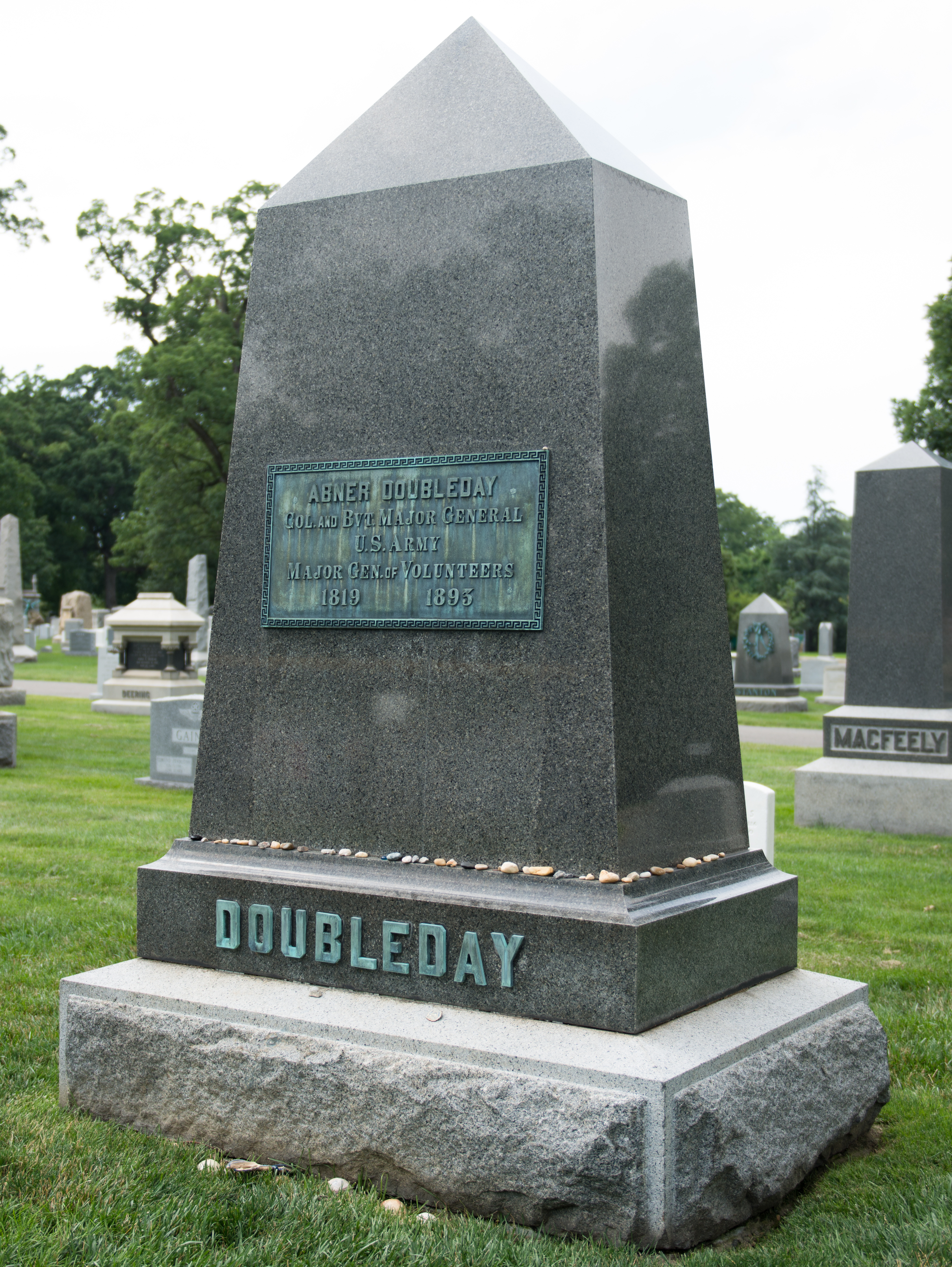
Doubleday's tombstone in Arlington National Cemetery

Doubleday died of heart disease in Mendham Township on January 26, 1893. Doubleday's body was laid in state in New York's City Hall and then was taken to Washington by train from Mendham, and was buried in Arlington National Cemetery in Arlington County, Virginia. He was survived by his wife.

== Baseball ==
Although Doubleday achieved minor fame as a competent combat general with experience in many important Civil War battles, he is more widely known as the supposed inventor of the game of baseball, supposed to have invented the game in 1839 in Elihu Phinney's cow pasture in Cooperstown, New York.

The Mills Commission, chaired by Abraham G. Mills, the fourth president of the National League, was appointed idiosyncratically in 1905 to determine the origin of baseball. On December 30, 1907, the committee's final report, in part, stated that "the first scheme for playing baseball, according to the best evidence obtainable to date, was devised by Abner Doubleday at Cooperstown, New York, in 1839." It concluded by saying, "in the years to come, in the view of the hundreds of thousands of people who are devoted to baseball, and the millions who will be, Abner Doubleday's fame will rest evenly, if not quite as much, upon the fact that he was its inventor ... as upon his brilliant and distinguished career as an officer in the Federal Army."

However, there is considerable evidence to dispute this claim. Baseball historian George B. Kirsch has described the results of the Mills Commission as a "myth", writing that "Robert Henderson, Harold Seymour, and other scholars have since debunked the Doubleday-Cooperstown myth, which nonetheless remains powerful in the American imagination because of the efforts of Major League Baseball and the Hall of Fame in Cooperstown." At his death, Doubleday left many letters and papers, none of which describe baseball or give any suggestion that he considered himself a prominent person in the evolution of the game, and his New York Times obituary did not mention the game at all. Chairman Mills himself, who had been a Civil War colleague of Doubleday and a member of the honor guard for Doubleday's body as it lay in state in New York City, never recalled hearing Doubleday describe his role as the inventor. Doubleday was a cadet at West Point in the year of the alleged invention and his family had moved away from Cooperstown the prior year. Furthermore, the primary testimony to the commission that connected baseball to Doubleday was that of Abner Graves, whose credibility is questionable. In the years after he gave his testimony, Graves shot his wife to death and was committed to an institution for the criminally insane for the rest of his life. Part of the confusion could stem from there being another man by the same name in Cooperstown in 1839.

Despite the lack of solid evidence linking Doubleday to the origins of baseball, Cooperstown, New York, became the new home of what is today the National Baseball Hall of Fame and Museum in 1937.

There may have been some relationship to baseball as a national sport and Abner Doubleday. While the modern rules of baseball were formulated in New York during the 1840s, it was the scattering of New Yorkers exposed to these rules throughout the country that spread not only baseball, but also the "New York Rules" in particular, thereby harmonizing the rules, and being a catalyst for its growth. In his capacity as a high-ranking officer, whose duties included seeing to provisions for the U.S. Army fighting throughout the South and border states, Doubleday is said to have provisioned balls and bats for the morale of the men.

== Namesakes and honors ==
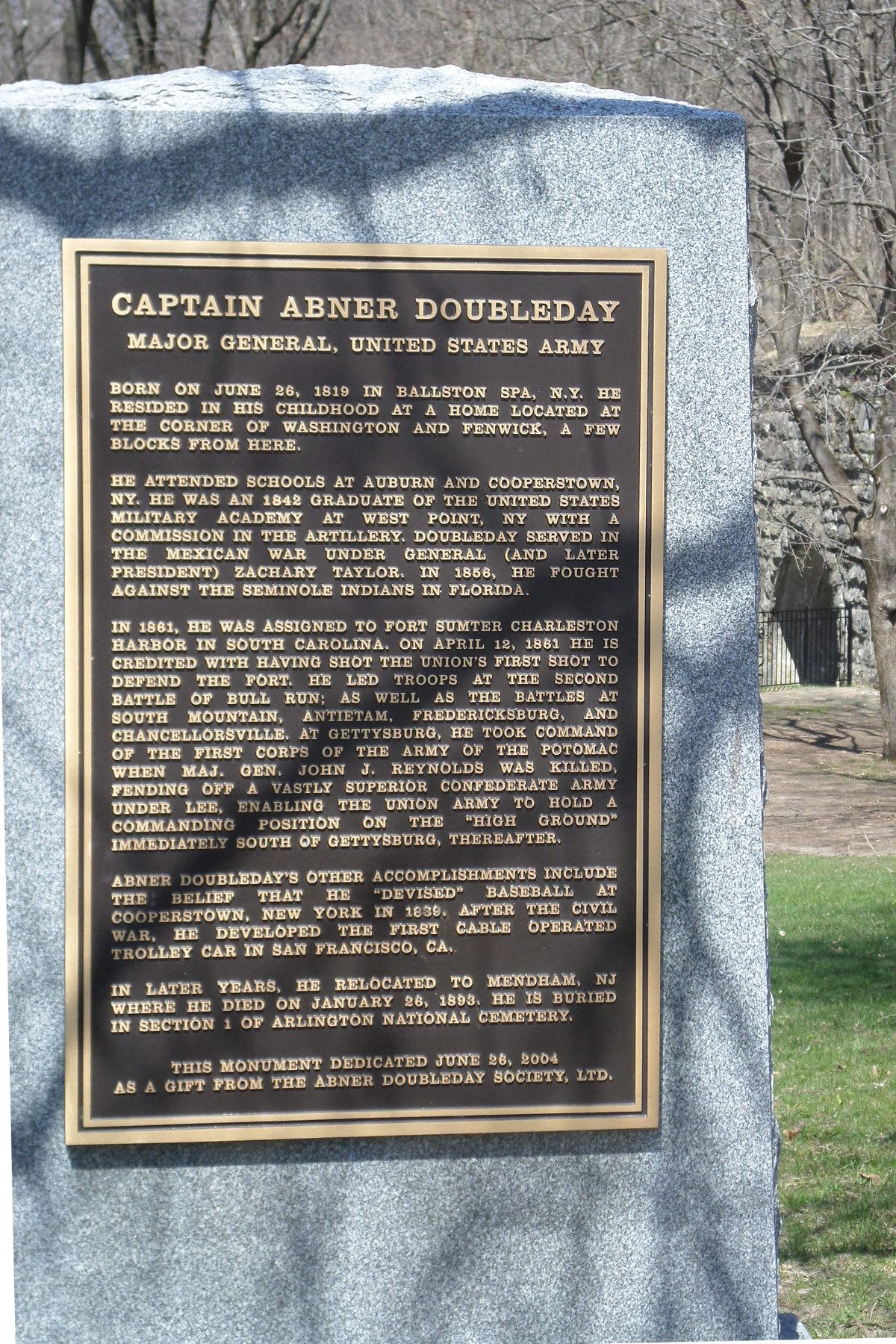
Abner Doubleday monument in Ballston Spa

Doubleday's men, admirers, and the state of New York erected a monument to him at Gettysburg. There is a 7-foot (2.1 m) obelisk monument at Arlington National Cemetery where he is buried.

Doubleday Field is a 9,791-seat baseball stadium named for Abner Doubleday, located in Cooperstown, New York, near the Baseball Hall of Fame. It hosted the annual Hall of Fame Game, an exhibition game between two major league teams that was played from 1940 until 2008, and has hosted the Hall of Fame Classic since 2009.

The Auburn Doubledays are a collegiate summer baseball team based in Doubleday's hometown of Auburn, New York.

At the United States Military Academy at West Point, New York, where the Army Black Knights play at Johnson Stadium, Doubleday Field is named in Doubleday's honor.

In Ballston Spa, New York, the town of his birth, Doubleday Fields are named for Doubleday. The house of his birth still stands in the middle of town and there is a monument to him on Front Street.

At the Doubleday Hill Monument, a sign to commemorate Doubleday's occupation of a hill in Williamsport, Maryland during the Civil War claims he invented the game in 1835.

For numerous years, Mendham Borough and Mendham Township, New Jersey has held a municipal holiday known as "Abner Doubleday Day" in the General's honor and in 1998 commissioned a plaque near the site of his home in the borough, even though the borough was known as Mendham Township back then.

The Abner Doubleday Society erected a monument to Doubleday in Iron Spring Park near his birthplace in Ballston Spa in 2004.

In World War II, the United States Liberty ship SS Abner Doubleday was named in his honor.

== Dates of rank ==
=== United States Army ===
Date	Insignia	Rank	Brevet Promotions
September 1, 1838		Cadet	
July 1, 1842		Brevet Second Lieutenant	
February 24, 1845		Second Lieutenant	
March 3, 1847		First Lieutenant	
March 3, 1855		Captain	
May 4, 1861		Major	Bvt. Lieutenant Colonel (1862) (Note: September 17, 1862, for gallantry and meritorious service at the Battle of Antietam.); Bvt. Colonel (1863) (Note: July 2, 1863, for gallantry and meritorious service at the Battle of Gettysburg.)
September 20, 1863		Lieutenant Colonel	Bvt. Brigadier General (1865) (Note: March 13, 1865, for gallantry and meritorious service during the Civil War.); Bvt. Major General (1865) (Note: March 13, 1865, for gallantry and meritorious service during the Civil War.)
September 15, 1867		Colonel	
July 20, 1848	Placed on the retired list with the rank of colonel (died January 26, 1893).		

=== United States Volunteers ===
Date	Insignia	Rank	Brevet Promotions
February 3, 1862		Brigadier General	
November 29, 1862		Major General	
January 5, 1866	Honorably mustered out of volunteer service.		

== See also ==
- List of American Civil War generals (Union)
- William Webb Ellis, sometimes apocryphally credited with inventing rugby football

== Notes ==
Military offices
Preceded by John F. Reynolds	Commander of the I Corps (Army of the Potomac); July 1, 1863 – July 2, 1863	Succeeded by John Newton
