= Elihu Phinney =

Elihu Phinney (14 July 1755 Lebanon, Connecticut – 12 July 1813 Otsego, New York) was the first printer in Cooperstown, New York. In the early 1790s he lived in Canaan, Columbia County, New York, where – from June 11, 1794, to February 28, 1795 – he published and edited the Columbian Mercury, and Canaan Repository of Rural Knowledge.

== History ==
Phinney was invited to Cooperstown by William Cooper, the wealthy land developer who had established the village in Otsego County, New York. In 1795, Phinney established a printing and publishing business there that produced, among other publications, the weekly The Otsego Herald; or, Western Advertiser from April 3, 1795, to September 12, 1805. In his newspaper, Phinney recalled that, "... in the winter of 1793, penetrated a wilderness, and broke a track, through a deep snow, with six teams, in the 'depth' of winter, and was received with a cordiality, bordering on homage."

According to historical accounts, James Fenimore Cooper, Judge Cooper's son and a future novelist, frequented Phinney's print shop, where he learned to set type for his own amusement. The families later became connected through marriage when Cooper's daughter, Caroline Martha Cooper (1815–1892), married Phinney's grandson, Henry Frederick Phinney (1816–1875), in 1849.

Initially, Phinney used his publications to support Judge Cooper (1754–1809), a Federalist. By the end of the first decade of the 19th century, however, Phinney had shifted his support to the Clintonian Republicans, who had become the county's majority party. He not only endorsed Cooper's political opponents but also sponsored a petition to rename Cooperstown "Otsego Village".

Phinney's publishing enterprise helped establish Cooperstown as a major publishing center during the first half of the 19th century.

In addition to operating a bookshop in Cooperstown, the Phinneys distributed their own publications and those of other American publishers using large wagons and Erie Canal "bookboats", expanding their market into Western New York.

== Elihu Phinney Jr. and Henry Phinney ==
Following Elihu Phinney's death in 1813, his sons, Henry (1781–1850) and Elihu Phinney Jr. (1785–1863), took over the family business. Operating as H. & E. Phinney, they published, among other works, 138 editions of the Bible between 1822 and 1848, when the company relocated to Buffalo.{{efn|group=lower-alpha |Abner Doubleday, the supposed inventor of baseball, Joseph Smith, founder of the Latter Day Saint movement, used the firm's 1828 edition of the King James Version of the Bible, which included the Apocrypha, as the basis for his biblical revisions undertaken between 1830 and 1833.

Elihu Phinney Jr. served as supervisor of the Town of Otsego, which includes Cooperstown, from 1833 to 1840. Henry Phinney held the same office in 1850.

== Baseball legacy ==
Elihu Phinney's name also became associated with the history of baseball in Cooperstown. According to local tradition, Abner Doubleday, once credited with inventing baseball, played the game on Phinney's farm. (Note: The claim that Abner Doubleday invented baseball, traditionally dated to 1839 in Cooperstown, has been discredited by historians. See Doubleday myth.) The property was subsequently acquired for use as a baseball park, now known as Doubleday Field, which formerly hosted the annual Baseball Hall of Fame Game.

== Bibliography ==
=== References ===
- Chatham Courier (The) – The Rough Notes (1967–). Chatham, New York. LCCN sn88-74005; ISSN 1064-4644; OCLC 17315424 (all editions).
1. Nickles, Irving MacArthur ("Mac") (born 1944) (February 6, 1969). "Rough Notes" – "The Columbian Mercury – Canaan Historical Society Discovers Rare Issue of Newspaper Dated 1794 and Published in the Township". Vol. 143, no. 42. p. 13 (section A).
  1. Via Fultonhistory.com (PDF).
"Recently the Canaan Historical Society acquired from the American Antiquarian Society a xerox copy of the Columbian Mercury and Canaan Repository of Rural Knowledge printed in Canaan, New York in 1794. This newspaper was published weekly at Canaan from June 11, 1794, to February 28, 1795, but only one copy of the October 1st issue is known to have survived. This article includes a general discussion of newspapers in the late Eighteenth Century and tell some of the specific information found in this document."
- Francis, Bill (né William Joseph Francis) (September 6, 2005). "Cooperstown Connection: Doubleday Field, A Diamond in the Pasture – History of Doubleday Field". Explains how Phinney's farm became the famous baseball park. Cooperstown, New York: National Baseball Hall of Fame. Archived from the original on December 18, 2005.
- Holy Bible (The), Containing the Old and New Testaments: Together with the Apocrypha: Translated Out of the Original Tongues, and with Former Translations Diligently Compared and Revised, with Canne’s Marginal Notes and References. To Which Are Added, an Index: An Alphabetical Table of All the Names in the Old and New Testaments, with Their Significations; Tables of Scripture Weights; Measures, and Coins, &c (H & E Phinney's Stereotype ed.). Cooperstown, New York: H & E Phinney → Henry Phinney and Elihu Phinney. 1828. LCCN 07-7923 (1840 ed.); LCCN tmp96031600 (1848 ed.); OCLC 191251057, 1446942, 38859845, 21258495, 732354215, 378852935, 864230961.
1. 1828 ed. – via Internet Archive (Harold B. Lee Library)..
- Hurd, Duane Hamilton (1850–1924) (1878). History of Otsego County, New York. With Illustrations and Biographical Sketches of Some of Its Prominent Men and Pioneers. Philadelphia: Everts & Fariss. p. 260. Retrieved August 1, 2015. LCCN 08-19464; OCLC 2754957 (all editions).
1. Via HathiTrust (Cornell & Chicago)..
2. Via Wikisource (Allen County Public Library)..
3. Via Internet Archive (Cornell)..
  1. p. 260.
- Library of Congress: Directory of U.S. Newspapers in American Libraries.
1. Columbian Mercury, and Canaan Repository of Rural Knowledge (weekly). Published from June 11, 1794, to February 28, 1895. Elihu Phinney, editor and publisher. Canaan, New York. LCCN sn85-26207; OCLC 12089719 (all editions).
2. Otsego Herald (The); or, Western Advertiser (weekly). Published from April 3, 1795 (Vol. 1, no. 1), to September 12, 1805 (Vol. 11, no. 546). Elihu Phinney, editor and publisher. Cooperstown, New York. LCCN sn83-31207, LCCN 2004-252459 (microfilm); OCLC 9820327 (all editions), OCLC 11990536 (all editions).
