= Doubleday Hill Monument =

Coordinates: 39°35′55.75″N 77°49′30.95″W

The Doubleday Hill Monument is an American Civil War monument located in Williamsport, Maryland, in what is now River View Cemetery. Erected in 1897, the monument commemorates the crossing of the Potomac River and occupation of the hill by Major General Abner Doubleday. The monument, also known Doubleday Hill, overlooks the Potomac River into West Virginia.

The monument also credits Doubleday with creating the game of baseball in 1835, an unlikely claim which Doubleday himself never made. A popular legend circulating at the time of the monument's erection claimed that Doubleday invented baseball in 1839, although Doubleday was attending West Point that year.

Doubleday Hill was a deviation from the more popular form of late 19th and early 20th century monuments: the statue of a standing, uniformed soldier. Between the years of 1863 through 1919, monuments often depicted a soldier “standing holding the barrel of a rifle that rests upright on the ground in front of him." This more common form was particularly prevalent from 1880 to 1920.

Monuments placed at locations other than battlefield parks during the years 1863 to 1919 normally honored soldiers and sailors from the same town, county, or state where the monument was erected. The Doubleday Hill monument differed from this practice by celebrating occupation of the site by Doubleday, who was from Ballston Spa, New York.

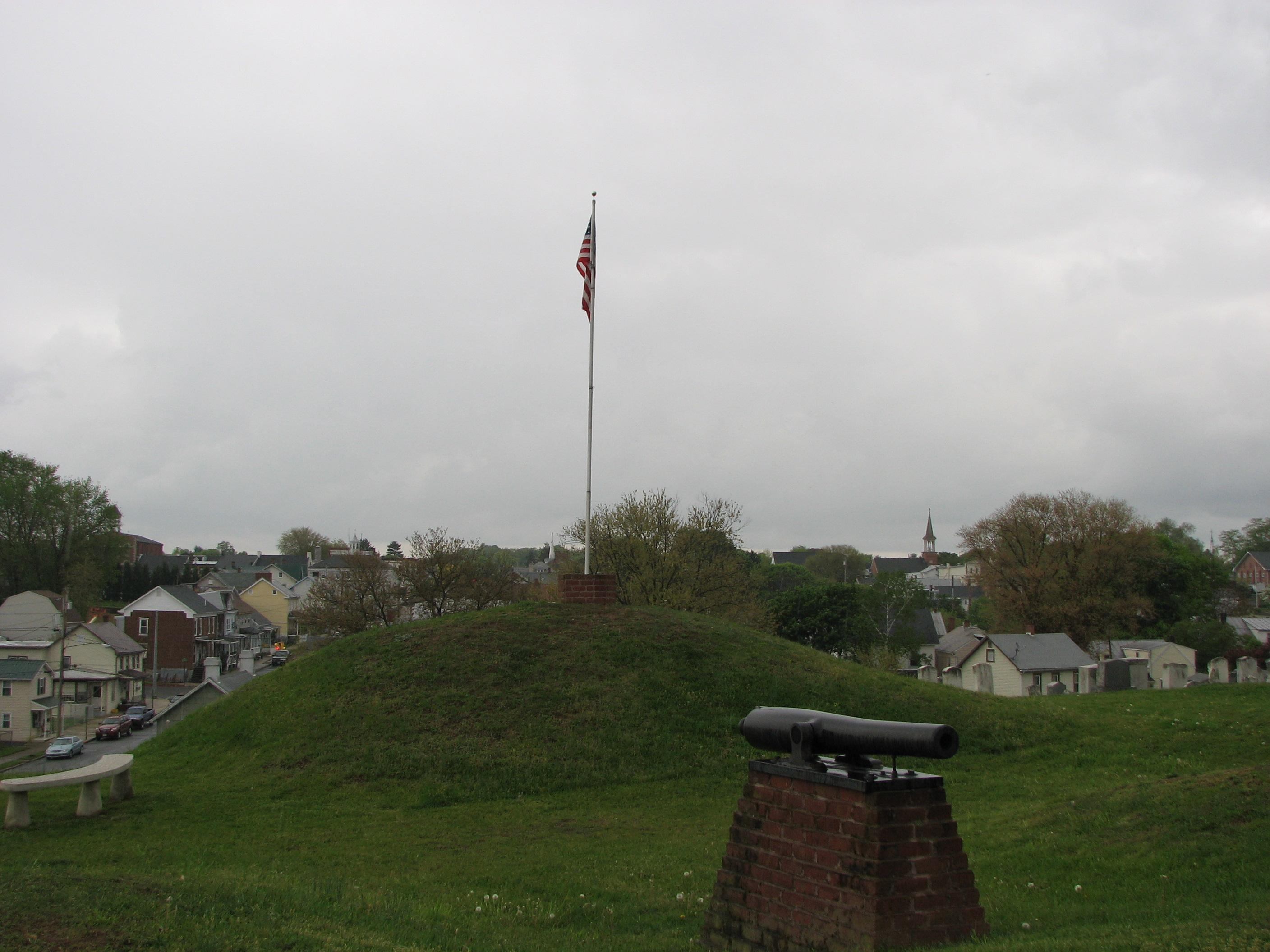
Doubleday Hill Monument shown with Flag and Cannon

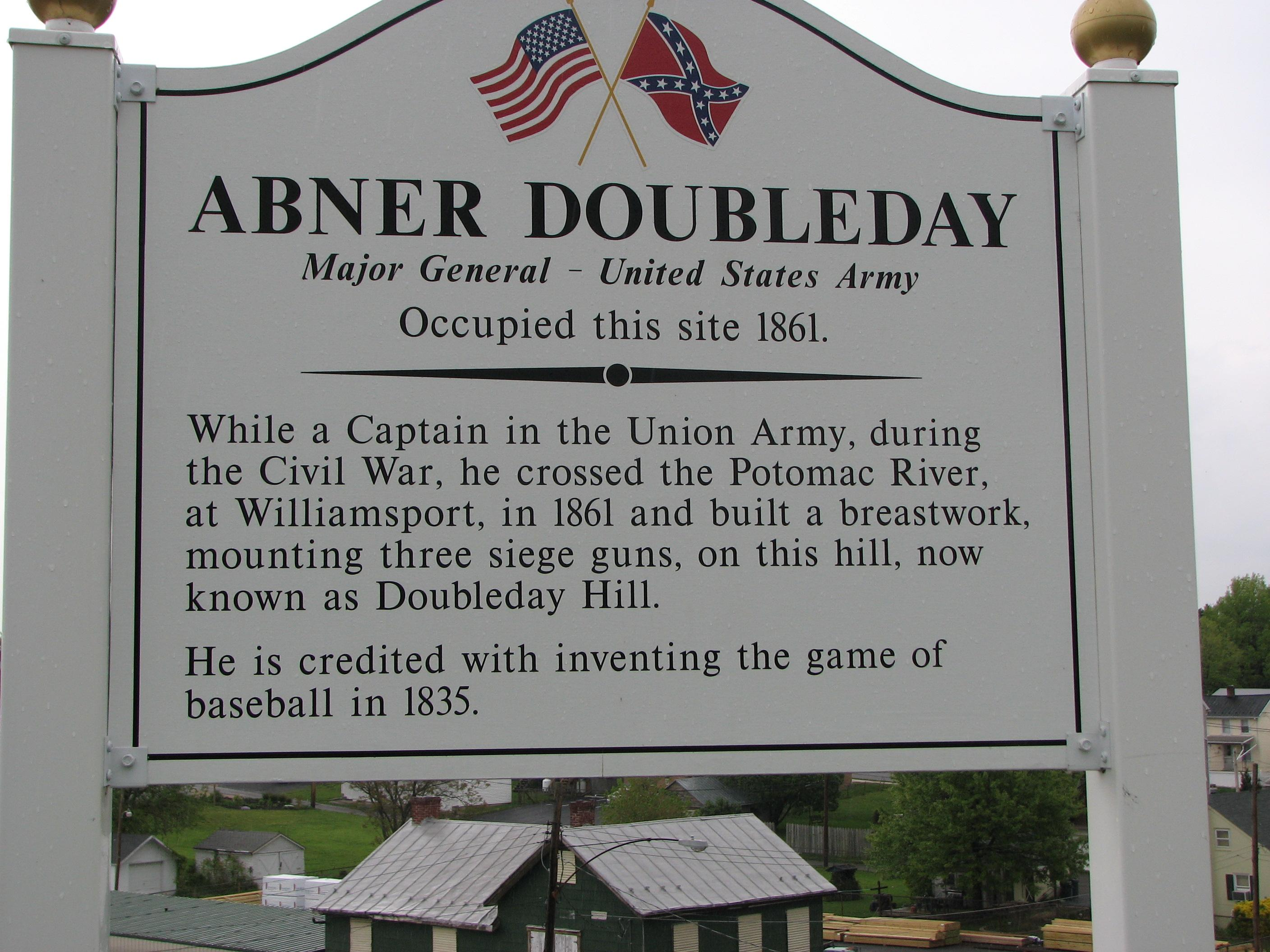
Doubleday Hill Monument Sign
