= Doubleday Field =

Historic baseball field in Cooperstown, New York

Coordinates: 42°41′57.4″N 74°55′36″W

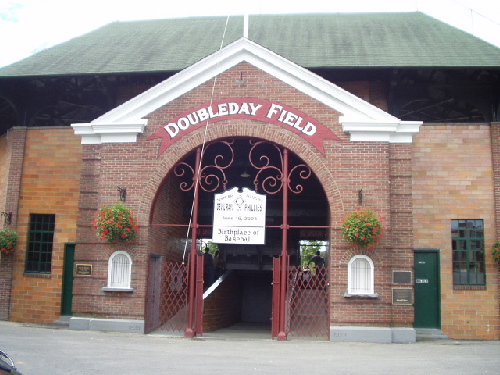
- Interactive map of Doubleday Field
- Location: Cooperstown, New York
- Capacity: 9,791
- Surface: Grass
- Field size: Left field: 296ft Left-center field: 336ft Center field: 390ft Right-center field: 350ft Right field: 312ft

Construction
- Opened: 1920
- Expanded: 1924, 1939

Tenants
- MLB Hall of Fame (1943–2008); Baseball Hall of Fame Classic (2009–present); Cooperstown Hawkeyes (PGCBL) (2010–2013)

Doubleday Field is a baseball stadium in Cooperstown, New York named for Abner Doubleday and located two village blocks from the National Baseball Hall of Fame and Museum.

The grounds have been used for baseball since 1920, on what was Elihu Phinney's farm. A wooden grandstand was built in 1924, later replaced by a steel and concrete grandstand built in 1939 by the Works Progress Administration. Subsequent expansion has increased seating capacity to 9,791 spectators.

== Hall of Fame Game ==
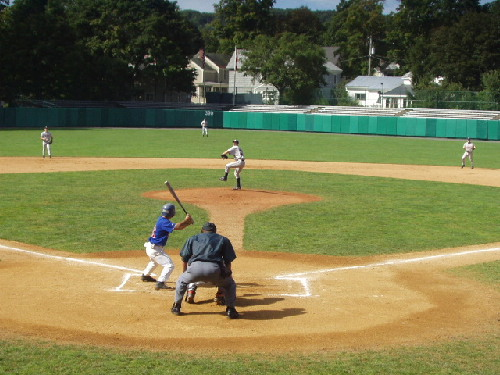
Doubleday Field, view from behind home plate.

Each year from 1940 to 2008, Doubleday Field hosted the Hall of Fame Game, an exhibition game between two major league squads. Originally, the game and induction ceremony for new Hall of Fame members were held on the same day, a Monday. Starting in 1979, the induction ceremony was moved to Sunday, with the game played on Monday. Starting in 2003, the game was scheduled in May or June, to better accommodate the participating teams' travel schedules.

As MLB's last remaining in-season exhibition game, its results did not count in the official standings, and substitute players were generally used to avoid injury to starters. The curiosity factor of two teams from different leagues playing each other in this game outside of a charity game, World Series, or spring training situation was eventually removed in 1997 with the advent of interleague play, further reducing the game's cachet. As it was placed in the major league schedule and delaying the game was logistically impossible, several times the game was cancelled and not played in a year due to weather or other circumstances, including rain, the 1981 player's strike, and, one year, a plane malfunction. Games going into extra innings stopped with the 1988 edition, with only nine innings played and ties being declared.

On January 29, 2008, Major League Baseball announced that the final Hall of Fame Game would be played on June 16, 2008, between the Chicago Cubs and San Diego Padres, citing "the inherent challenges" of scheduling teams in the modern day as the reason for ending the annual contest. The 2008 game was rained out and never rescheduled, making the 2007 matchup between the Baltimore Orioles and Toronto Blue Jays the last Hall of Fame Game that was played.

=== Results ===
Key to colors
| National League victory over American League |
| American League victory over National League |

| Date | Winning team | Score | Losing team | Score | Notes | Series |
|---|---|---|---|---|---|---|
| June 13, 1940 | Chicago Cubs | 10 | Boston Red Sox | 9 | 7 innings-rain | NL, 1–0 |
| June 13, 1941 | Cleveland Indians | 2 | Cincinnati Reds | 1 | 6 innings-rain | Tied, 1–1 |
| August 3, 1942 | St. Louis Cardinals | 5 | Philadelphia Athletics | 2 | | NL, 2–1 |
| July 19, 1943 | Brooklyn Dodgers | 7 | Chicago White Sox | 5 | | NL, 3–1 |
| July 10, 1944 | Detroit Tigers vs. New York Giants | | | | canceled-rain | |
| 1945 | | | | | canceled-war restrictions | |
| June 13, 1946 | New York Giants | 9 | Detroit Tigers | 5 | | NL, 4–1 |
| July 21, 1947 | Boston Braves | 4 | New York Yankees | 3 | 10 innings | NL, 5–1 |
| July 12, 1948 | St. Louis Browns | 7 | Philadelphia Phillies | 5 | | NL, 5–2 |
| June 13, 1949 | Washington Senators | 8 | Pittsburgh Pirates | 7 | | NL, 5–3 |
| July 24, 1950 | Boston Red Sox | 8 | New York Giants | 5 | | NL, 5–4 |
| July 23, 1951 | Brooklyn Dodgers | 9 | Philadelphia Athletics | 4 | | NL, 6–4 |
| July 21, 1952 | Cleveland Indians | 4 | Chicago Cubs | 2 | | NL, 6–5 |
| July 27, 1953 | Cincinnati Reds | 16 | Chicago White Sox | 6 | | NL, 7–5 |
| August 9, 1954 | New York Yankees | 10 | Cincinnati Reds | 9 | | NL, 7–6 |
| July 25, 1955 | Boston Red Sox | 4 | Milwaukee Braves | 2 | | Tied, 7–7 |
| July 23, 1956 | New York Giants | 11 | Detroit Tigers | 10 | 12 innings | NL, 8–7 |
| July 22, 1957 | Chicago White Sox | 13 | St. Louis Cardinals | 4 | | Tied, 8–8 |
| August 4, 1958 | Washington Senators | 5 | Philadelphia Phillies | 4 | | AL, 9–8 |
| July 20, 1959 | Kansas City Athletics 5, Pittsburgh Pirates 5 | | | | 6 innings-rain (tie game) | AL, 9–8–1 |
| June 27, 1960 | Chicago Cubs | 5 | Cleveland Indians | 0 | | Tied, 9–9–1 |
| July 24, 1961 | Los Angeles Dodgers | 6 | Baltimore Orioles | 2 | | NL, 10–9–1 |
| July 23, 1962 | Milwaukee Braves vs. New York Yankees | | | | cancelled-rain | |
| August 5, 1963 | Boston Red Sox | 7 | Milwaukee Braves | 3 | | Tied, 10–10–1 |
| July 27, 1964 | Washington Senators | 6 | New York Mets | 4 | | AL, 11–10–1 |
| July 26, 1965 | New York Yankees | 7 | Philadelphia Phillies | 4 | | AL, 12–10–1 |
| July 25, 1966 | St. Louis Cardinals | 7 | Minnesota Twins | 5 | | AL, 12–11–1 |
| July 24, 1967 | Baltimore Orioles | 3 | Cincinnati Reds | 0 | Reds' ninth inning rained out | AL, 13–11–1 |
| July 22, 1968 | Detroit Tigers | 10 | Pittsburgh Pirates | 1 | | AL, 14–11–1 |
| July 28, 1969 | Minnesota Twins | 7 | Houston Astros | 2 | 5 innings-rain | AL, 15–11–1 |
| July 27, 1970 | Montreal Expos | 10 | Chicago White Sox | 6 | | AL, 15–12–1 |
| August 9, 1971 | Cleveland Indians | 13 | Chicago Cubs | 5 | | AL, 16–12–1 |
| August 7, 1972 | New York Yankees | 8 | Los Angeles Dodgers | 3 | | AL, 17–12–1 |
| August 6, 1973 | Texas Rangers | 6 | Pittsburgh Pirates | 4 | | AL, 18–12–1 |
| August 12, 1974 | Atlanta Braves | 12 | Chicago White Sox | 9 | | AL, 18–13–1 |
| August 18, 1975 | Boston Red Sox | 11 | San Francisco Giants | 5 | | AL, 19–13–1 |
| August 9, 1976 | Milwaukee Brewers | 9 | New York Mets | 3 | | AL, 20–13–1 |
| August 8, 1977 | Minnesota Twins | 8 | Philadelphia Phillies | 5 | | AL, 21–13–1 |
| August 7, 1978 | Detroit Tigers 4, New York Mets 4 | | | | 6½ innings-rain (tie game) | AL, 21–13–2 |
| August 6, 1979 | Texas Rangers | 12 | San Diego Padres | 5 | | AL, 22–13–2 |
| August 4, 1980 | Pittsburgh Pirates | 11 | Chicago White Sox | 8 | | AL, 22–14–2 |
| August 3, 1981 | Cincinnati Reds vs. Oakland Athletics † | | | | canceled-players' strike | |
| August 2, 1982 | Chicago White Sox 4, New York Mets 4 | | | | 8 innings-rain (tie game) | AL, 22–14–3 |
| August 1, 1983 | St. Louis Cardinals | 4 | Baltimore Orioles | 1 | | AL, 22–15–3 |
| August 13, 1984 | Detroit Tigers | 7 | Atlanta Braves | 5 | | AL, 23–15–3 |
| July 29, 1985 | Houston Astros | 5 | Boston Red Sox | 3 | 10 innings | AL, 23–16–3 |
| August 4, 1986 | Texas Rangers | 11 | Kansas City Royals | 4 | | AL, 24–16–3 |
| July 27, 1987 | New York Yankees | 3 | Atlanta Braves | 0 | | AL, 25–16–3 |
| August 1, 1988 | Chicago Cubs 1, Cleveland Indians 1 | | | | 9 innings (tie game) | AL, 25–16–4 |
| July 24, 1989 | Boston Red Sox vs. Cincinnati Reds ‡ | | | | canceled-plane malfunction | |
| August 6, 1990 | Baltimore Orioles vs. Montreal Expos | | | | canceled-rain | |
| July 22, 1991 | Minnesota Twins | 6 | San Francisco Giants | 4 | | AL, 26–16–4 |
| August 3, 1992 | New York Mets | 3 | Chicago White Sox | 0 | | AL, 26–17–4 |
| August 2, 1993 | Cleveland Indians vs. Los Angeles Dodgers | | | | canceled-rain | |
| August 1, 1994 | Seattle Mariners | 4 | Philadelphia Phillies | 3 | | AL, 27–17–4 |
| July 31, 1995 | Chicago Cubs | 8 | Detroit Tigers | 6 | | AL, 27–18–4 |
| August 5, 1996 | California Angels 6, Montreal Expos 6 | | | | 9 innings (tie game) | AL, 27–18–5 |
| August 4, 1997 | Los Angeles Dodgers | 16 | San Diego Padres | 8 | | @ |
| July 27, 1998 | Baltimore Orioles | 7 | Toronto Blue Jays | 1 | | @ |
| July 26, 1999 | Texas Rangers | 11 | Kansas City Royals | 9 | 8 innings-rain | @ |
| July 24, 2000 | Arizona Diamondbacks | 12 | Cleveland Indians | 7 | | AL, 27–19–5 |
| August 6, 2001 | Milwaukee Brewers | 6 | Florida Marlins | 2 | | @ |
| July 29, 2002 | Colorado Rockies | 18 | Chicago White Sox | 10 | | AL, 27–20–5 |
| June 16, 2003 | Philadelphia Phillies | 7 | Tampa Bay Devil Rays | 5 | | AL, 27–21–5 |
| June 14, 2004 | Atlanta Braves | 10 | Minnesota Twins | 7 | | AL, 27–22–5 |
| May 23, 2005 | Detroit Tigers | 6 | Boston Red Sox | 4 | | @ |
| May 15, 2006 | Cincinnati Reds vs. Pittsburgh Pirates | | | | canceled after 2½ innings-rain | |
| May 21, 2007 | Baltimore Orioles | 13 | Toronto Blue Jays | 7 | | @ |
| June 16, 2008 | Chicago Cubs vs. San Diego Padres | | | | canceled-rain | |

Notes:

† A New York–Penn League game between the Elmira Pioneers and Oneonta Yankees was played in 1981.
‡ The Boston Red Sox played an intra-squad game in 1989.
@ Denotes games played between teams in the same league.
With the participation of the Tampa Bay Devil Rays in 2003, every MLB franchise had participated in a Hall of Fame game.

Source: Hall of Fame Game History – National Baseball Hall of Fame and Museum.

== Hall of Fame Classic ==
In November 2008, the Hall of Fame and the MLB Players Alumni Association announced the creation of the Hall of Fame Classic, an exhibition game involving Hall of Famers and other retired MLB players to be played on Father's Day weekend, and in recent years on the Saturday before Memorial Day. The inaugural Hall of Fame Classic was played on Sunday, June 21, 2009. The Hall of Fame game lasts seven innings or two hours, whichever comes first. In addition to the game, there is a parade and a home run derby beforehand. The game was played annually between 2011 and 2019. (The 2020 and 2021 games were canceled due to the COVID-19 pandemic). The game returned in May 2022.

In 2024, the Hall of Fame game was the "East-West Classic", celebrating the Negro League's All Star Game. In 2025, the Hall of Fame replaced the game with the "Hall of Fame Film Series" before returning to the traditional game in 2026, as the "military classic" with a special America 250 theme.

== Cooperstown Classic ==
The Cooperstown Classic was an International League regular season game played in honor of the 125th anniversary of the league in 2008. The game was held on a Sunday afternoon in May between the Rochester Red Wings and the Syracuse Chiefs. The game was the third of a four-game series in which the Chiefs were the home team. The crowd for the game was very respectable and Major League Hall of Fame member Carlton Fisk threw out the first pitch. The game was postponed after the second inning after a rain delay in which Syracuse led 1-0 and went on to win the following day in its completion at Alliance Bank Stadium. In an attempt to give the fans another game, the Cooperstown Classic Two was played on a Sunday in June 2009. This game was played between the Pawtucket Red Sox and the home team Syracuse Chiefs. The game was played in full with the PawSox winning 15–3. The game has not been played since, though many have expressed interest in its return since the demise of the MLB Hall Of Fame Game in 2008.

== Other uses ==
Doubleday Field is used primarily for amateur and American Legion ball; The Legends of Baseball rents out Doubleday for three weeks over the summer. The Cooperstown Hawkeyes of the Perfect Game Collegiate Baseball League use the field during the summer, while Play at the Plate Baseball and JSB Baseball also has an annual event at Doubleday Field every September.

No professional team has ever called the stadium home, although in 1996 the Northeast League considered placing a franchise in Cooperstown; this idea was rejected because Doubleday Field has no lights, a necessity for a team in a pro league. Also, some felt that Cooperstown should be the home of all baseball, and not just one team. However, the New York–Penn League played an annual regular-season game at Doubleday Field from 1991 to 2019, with the team based in nearby Oneonta serving as the home team through 2009. (The team was known as the Oneonta Yankees until 1999, when they switched affiliations to become the Oneonta Tigers. The franchise moved to Connecticut in 2010, but continued to host the Cooperstown game.)

On September 16, 2023, the Savannah Bananas finished their 2023 Banana Ball World Tour at Doubleday Field against their rivals, the Party Animals. In front of a sold-out crowd, the Party Animals defeated the Bananas, 2–1.
